= Vermes in the 10th edition of Systema Naturae =

In 1758, in the 10th edition of Systema Naturae, the Swedish scientist and taxonomist Carl Linnaeus described the class "Vermes" as:

Animals of slow motion, soft substance, able to increase their bulk and restore parts which have been destroyed, extremely tenacious of life, and the inhabitants of moist places. Many of them are without a distinct head, and most of them without feet. They are principally distinguished by their tentacles (or feelers). By the Ancients they were not improperly called imperfect animals, as being destitute of ears, nose, head, eyes and legs; and are therefore totally distinct from Insects.

Linnaean Characteristics

- Heart: 1 auricle, 0 ventricles. Cold, pus-like blood.
- Spiracles: obscure
- Jaw: various
- Penis: frequently hermaphrodites
- Organs of Sense: tentacles (generally), eyes, no brain, no ears, no nostrils
- Covering: calcareous or none, except spines
- Supports: no feet, no fins. Crawls in moist places & are mute

The class Vermes, as Linnaeus conceived it, was a rather diverse and mismatched grouping of animals; basically it served as a wastebasket taxon for any invertebrate species that was not an arthropod. With the advent of the scientific understanding of evolution, it became clear that many of the animals in these groups were not in fact closely related, and so the class Vermes was dropped for several (at least 30) phyla.

== Intestina ==
Gordius (horsehair worms)

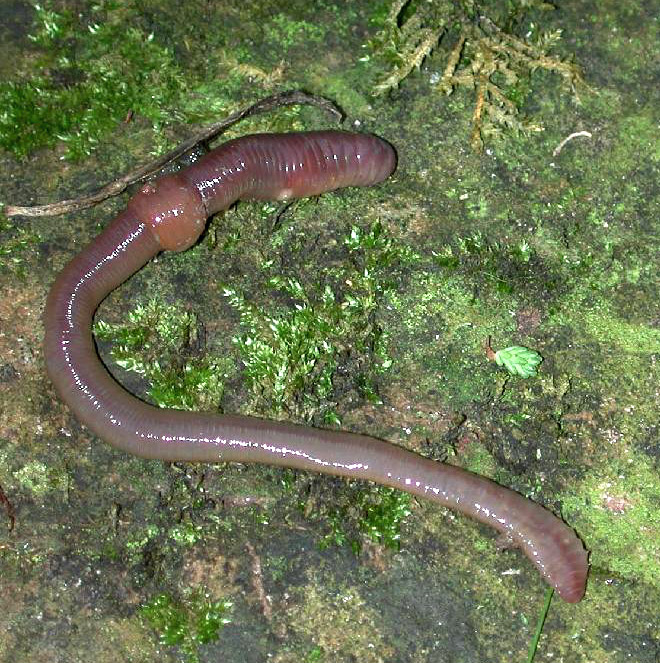
The common earthworm was named Lumbricus terrestris in 1758.

- Gordius aquaticus
- Gordius argillaceus
- Gordius medinensis – Dracunculus medinensis, the Guinea worm

Furia

- Furia infernalis – Despite the many accounts of this purported animal by respected authorities, including Daniel Solander and Linnaeus himself, it is now accepted that no such animal exists.

Lumbricus (earthworms)

- Lumbricus terrestris – common earthworm
- Lumbricus marinus – Arenicola marina, the blow lugworm

Ascaris (giant intestinal roundworms)

- Ascaris vermicularis – Enterobius vermicularis, the pinworm
- Ascaris lumbricoides – giant roundworm

Fasciola (liver flukes)

- Fasciola hepatica – sheep liver fluke
- Fasciola intestinalis

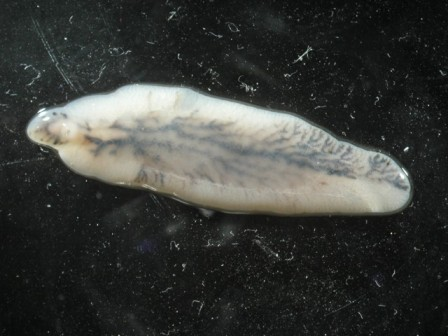
The sheep liver fluke was named Fasciola hepatica in 1758.

Hirudo (leeches)

- Hirudo sanguisuga – Haemopis sanguisuga, the Horse Leech
- Hirudo medicinalis – European medicinal leech
- Hirudo octoculata – Erpobdella octoculata
- Hirudo stagnalis – Helobdella stagnalis
- Hirudo complanata – Glossiphonia complanata
- Hirudo indica
- Hirudo geometra – Piscicola geometra
- Hirudo muricata – Pontobdella muricata

Myxine (hagfishes)

- Myxine glutinosa – Atlantic hagfish

Teredo (shipworms)

- Teredo lapidaria
- Teredo navalis – naval shipworm

== Mollusca ==
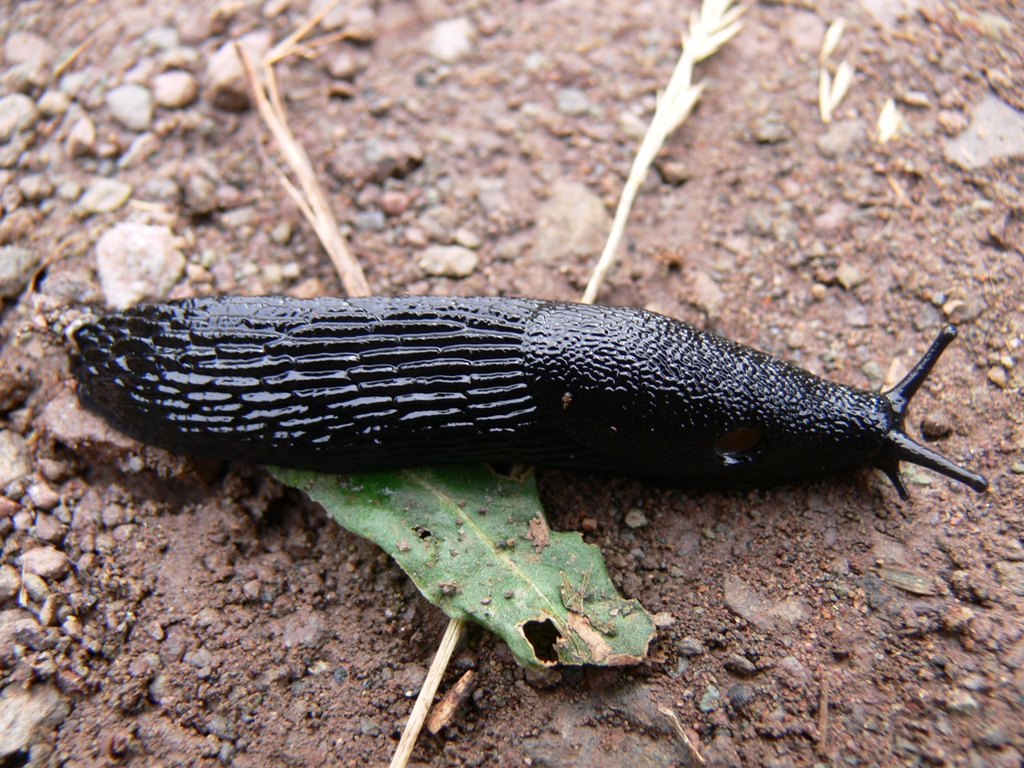
The black slug was named Limax ater in 1758.

Limax (terrestrial slugs)

- Limax ater – Arion ater, the black slug
- Limax rufus – Arion rufus, the red slug
- Limax maximus – leopard slug
- Limax agrestis – Deroceras agreste, the grey field slug
- Limax flavus – Limacus flavus, the yellow slug

Doris (dorid nudibranchs)

- Doris verrucosa

Tethys (tethydid sea slugs)

- Tethys limacina
- Tethys leporina – Tethys fimbria

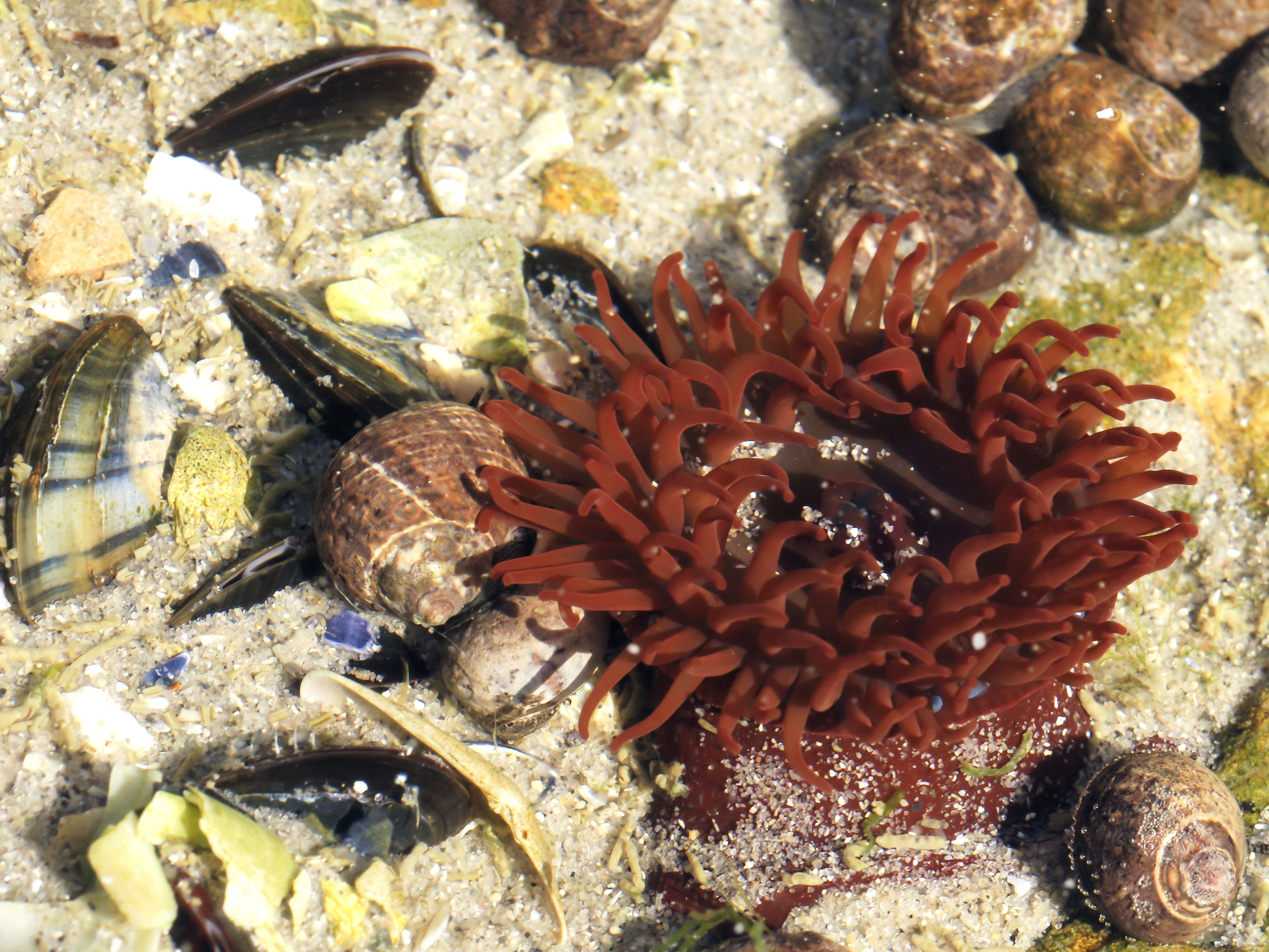
The beadlet anemone was named Priapus equinus in 1758.

Nereis (polychaete worms)

- Nereis lacustris – Stylaria lacustris
- Nereis caerulea
- Nereis gigantea – Hermodice carunculata, the bearded fireworm
- Nereis pelagica
- Nereis noctiluca

Aphrodita (Sea mice)

- Aphrodita squamata – Lepidonotus squamatus
- Aphrodita aculeata – sea mouse

Lernaea (anchor worms)

- Lernaea cyprinacea
- Lernaea asellina – Lernentoma asellina
- Lernaea salmonea – Salmincola salmoneus

Priapus (priapulid worms & anemones)

- Priapus equinus – now Actinia equina, the beadlet anemone
- Priapus humanus – now Priapulus caudatus, the cactus worm

Scyllaea (scyllaeid sea slugs)

- Scyllaea pelagica – sargassum nudibranch

Holothuria (salps & Men o' War)

- Holothuria physalis – Physalia physalis, the Portuguese man o' war
- Holothuria thalia, Holothuria caudata, & Holothuria denudata – Cyclosalpa pinnata

Triton (triton snails)

- Triton littoreus

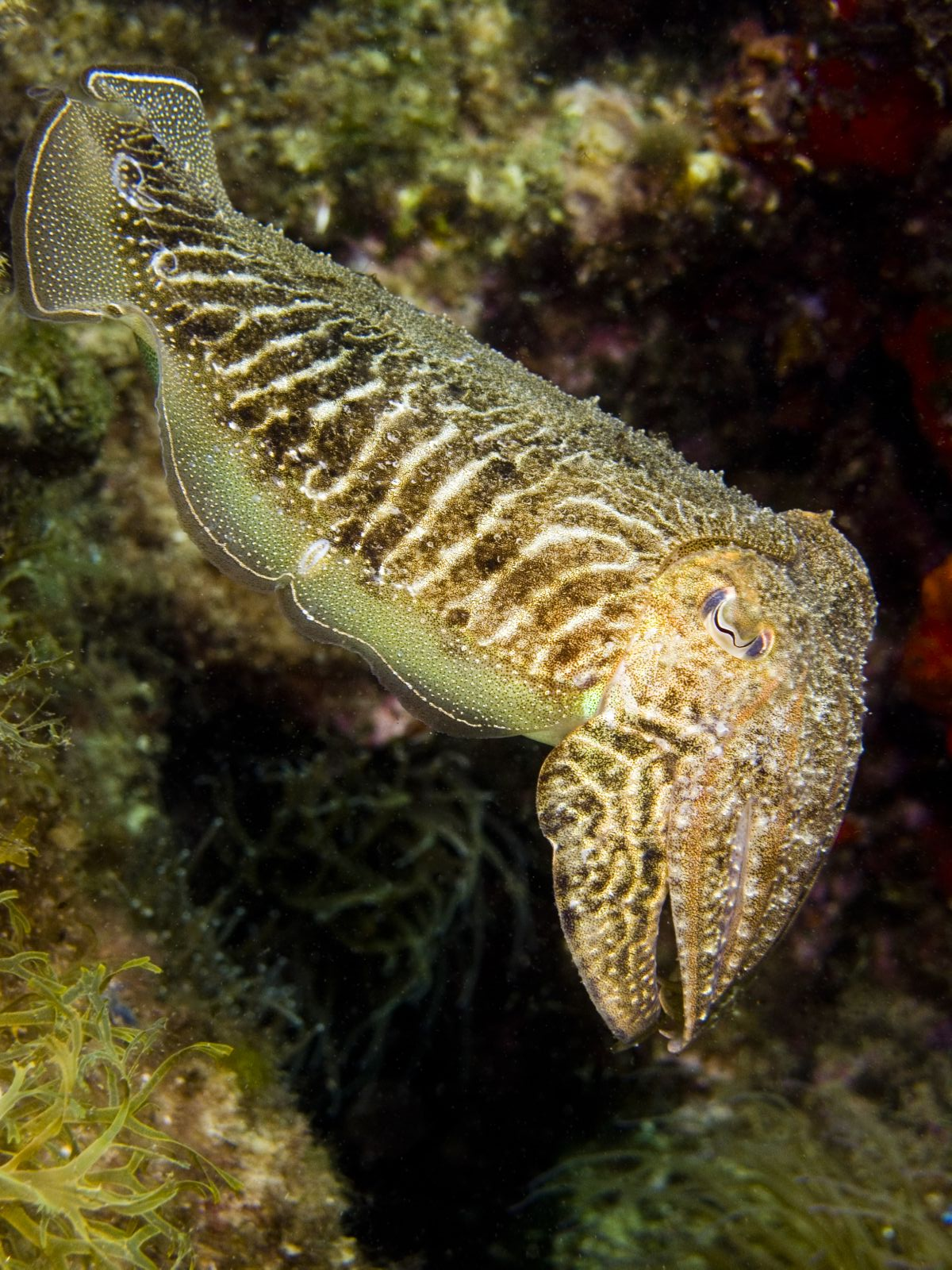
The common cuttlefish was named Sepia officinalis in 1758.

Sepia (octopuses, squid, & cuttlefish)

- Sepia octopodia – Eledone cirrhosa, the horned octopus
- Sepia officinalis – common cuttlefish
- Sepia media – Alloteuthis media, the midsize squid
- Sepia loligo - Loligo vulgaris, the common squid
- Sepia sepiola - Sepiola rondeleti, the dwarf bobtail

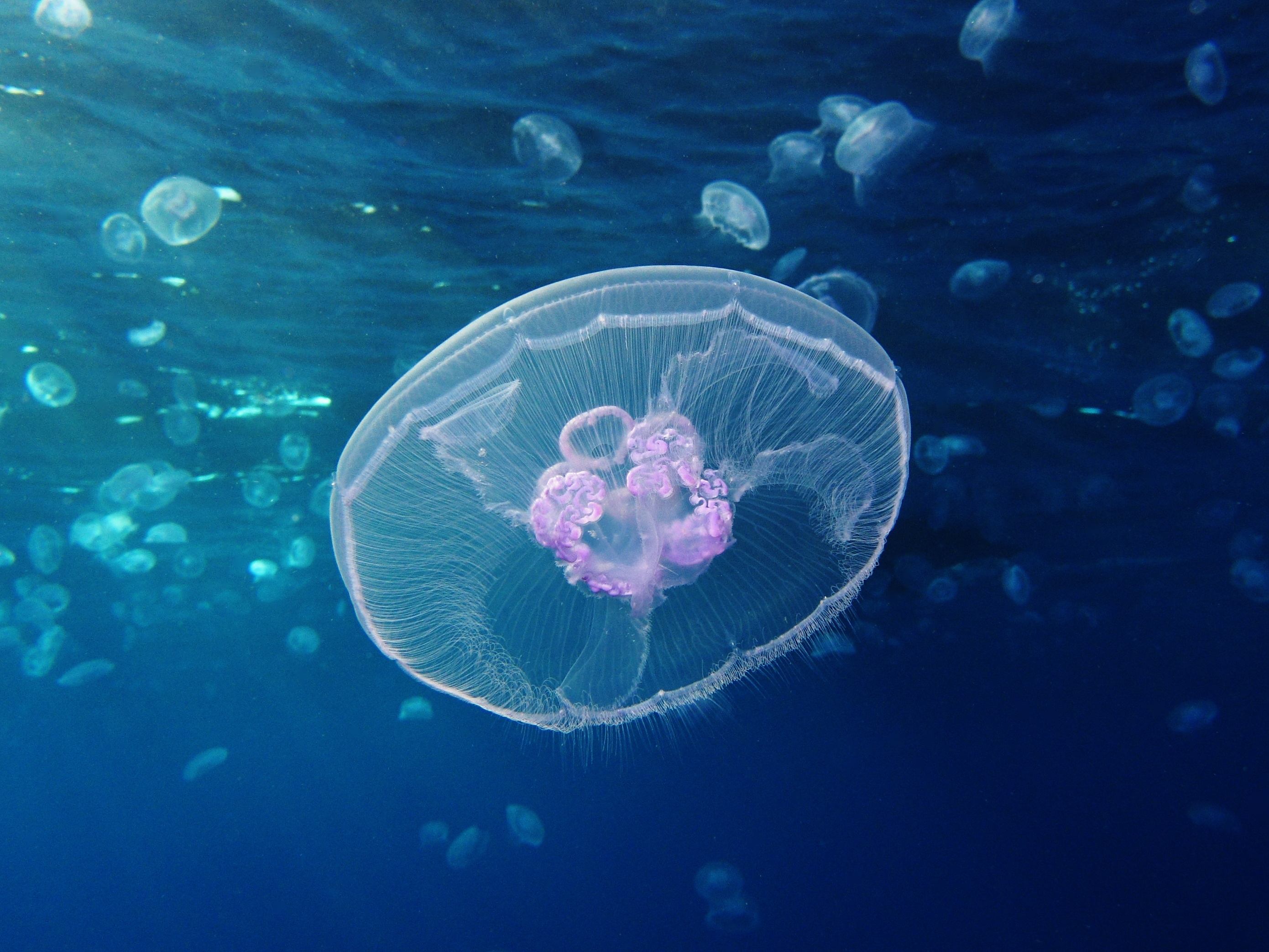
The moon jellyfish was named Medusa aurita in 1758.

Medusa (jellyfish)

- Medusa porpita – Porpita porpita, the blue button
- Medusa cruciata
- Medusa aequorea
- Medusa aurita – Aurelia aurita, the moon jellyfish
- Medusa capillata – Cyanea capillata, the lion's mane jellyfish
- Medusa pilearis
- Medusa marsupialis – Carybdea marsupialis, the mediterranean box jelly
- Medusa pelagica
- Medusa brachiata
- Medusa beroe – Beroe beroe
- Medusa velella – Velella velella, the sea raft

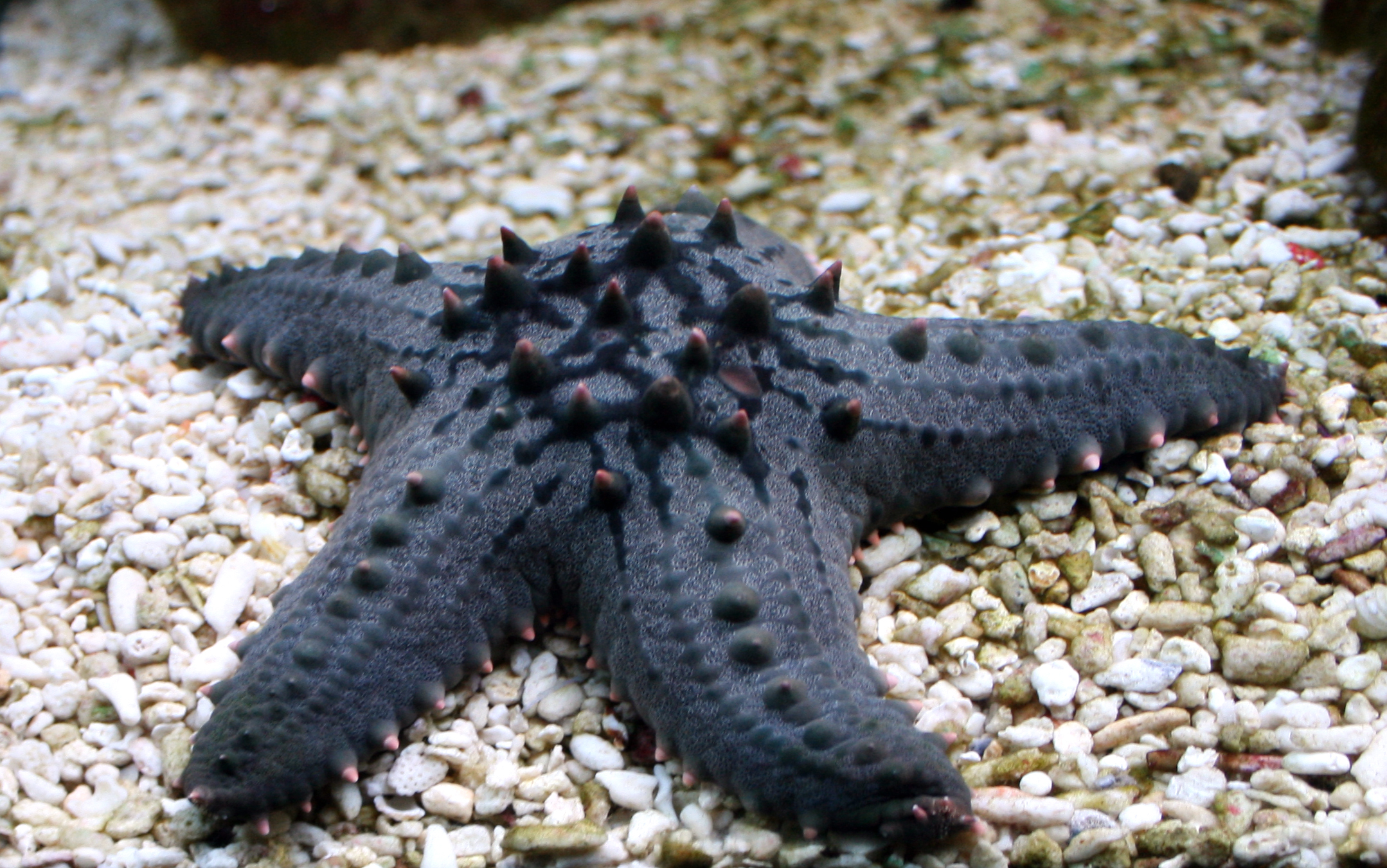
The horned sea star was named Asterias nodosa in 1758.

Asterias (starfish)

- Asterias luna – Anseropoda rosacea
- Asterias rubens – common starfish
- Asterias glacialis – Marthasterias glacialis, the spiny starfish
- Asterias reticulata – Oreaster reticulatus, the red cushion sea star
- Asterias nodosa – Protoreaster nodosus, the horned sea star
- Asterias aranciaca – Astropecten aranciacus, the red comb star
- Asterias equestris – Hippasteria phrygiana, the trojan star
- Asterias laevigata – Linckia laevigata, the blue star
- Asterias planci – Acanthaster planci, the crown-of-thorns starfish
- Asterias ophiura – Ophiura ophiura, the serpent star
- Asterias pectinata – Comatula pectinata
- Asterias multiradiata – Capillaster multiradiata
- Asterias Caput medusae – Gorgonocephalus caputmedusae, the medusa's head starfish

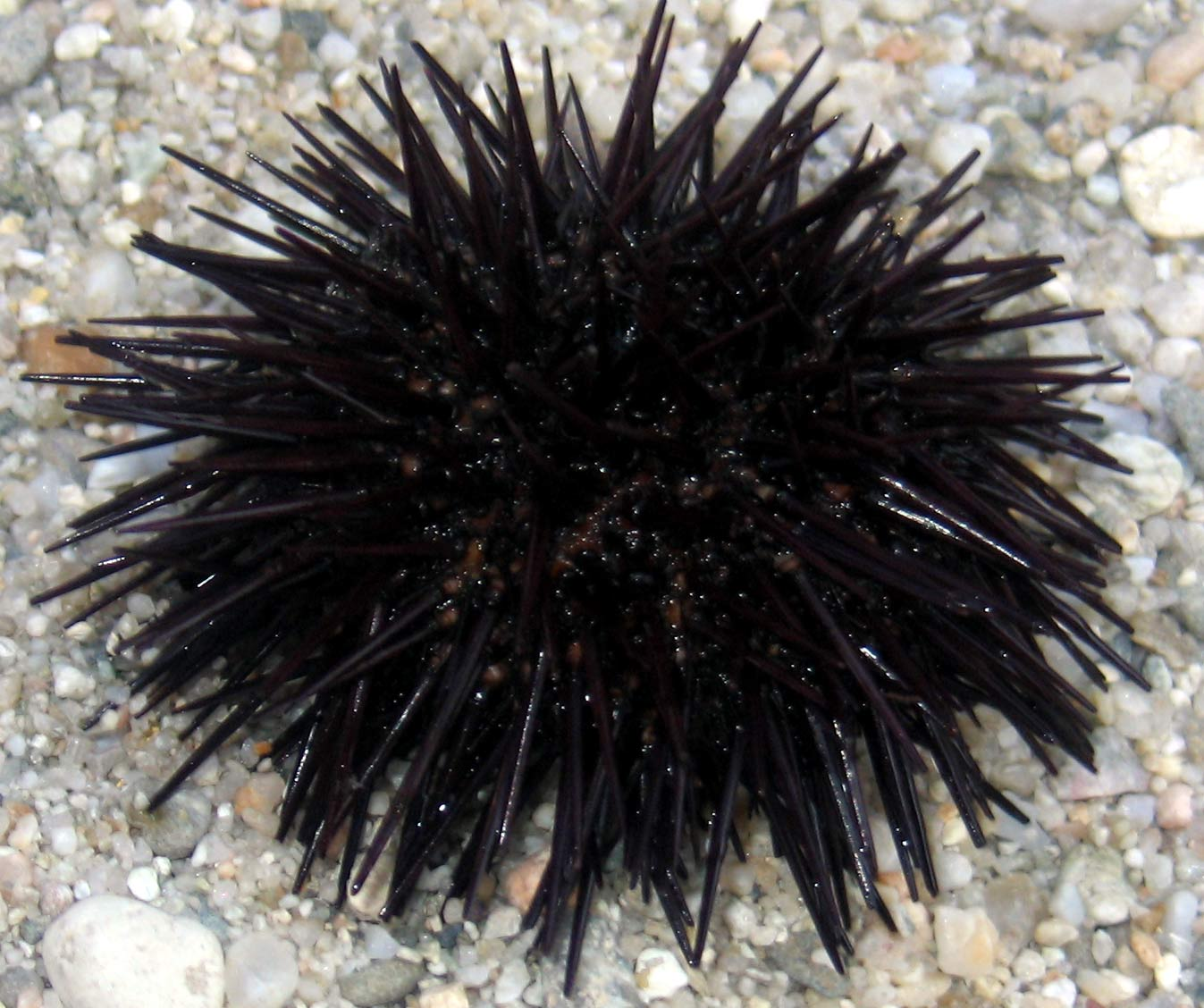
The black sea urchin was named Echinus lixula in 1758.

Echinus (sea urchins & sand dollars)

- Echinus esculentus – edible sea urchin
- Echinus globulus – Mespilia globulus, the globular sea urchin
- Echinus sphaeroides – Salmacis sphaeroides
- Echinus gratilla – Tripneustes gratilla, the collector urchin
- Echinus lixula – Arbacia lixula, the black sea urchin
- Echinus saxatilis – Diadema setosum
- Echinus diadema – Echinothrix diadema, the diadema urchin
- Echinus cidaris – Cidaris cidaris, the long-spine slate pencil urchin
- Echinus mamillatus – Heterocentrotus mammillatus, the slate pencil urchin
- Echinus lucunter – Echinometra lucunter, the rock-boring urchin
- Echinus atratus – Colobocentrotus atratus, the helmet urchin
- Echinus spatagus – Metalia spatagus
- Echinus lacunosus – Schizaster lacunosus
- Echinus rosaceus – Clypeaster rosaceus, the fat sea biscuit
- Echinus reticulatus – Clypeaster reticulatus, the reticulated sea biscuit
- Echinus placenta – Arachnoides placenta
- Echinus orbiculus – Hemiheliopsis fonti

== Testacea ==
Chiton (chitons)

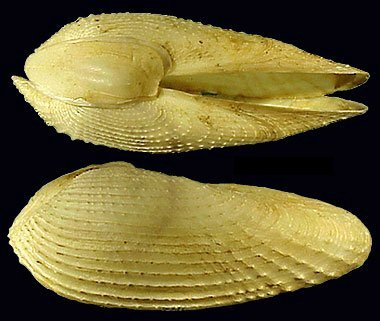
Barnea candida was named Pholas candidus in 1758.

- Chiton hispidus
- Chiton tuberculatus – West Indian green chiton
- Chiton aculeatus
- Chiton punctatus

Lepas (barnacles)

- Lepas balanus – Balanus balanus
- Lepas tintinnabulum – Megabalanus tintinnabulum
- Lepas testudinaria – Chelonibia testudinaria
- Lepas mitella – Capitulum mitella, the Japanese goose barnacle
- Lepas anatifera – pelagic gooseneck barnacle

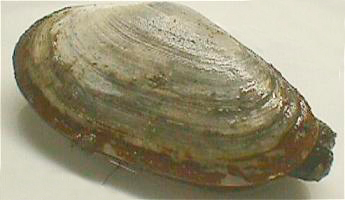
The common softshell was named Myes arenaria in 1758.

Pholas (piddocks & angelwings)

- Pholas dactylus – common piddock
- Pholas costatus – Cyrtopleura costata, the angel wing clam
- Pholas striatus – Martesia striata
- Pholas candidus – Barnea candida
- Pholas pusillus – Martesia striata

Mya (soft-shell clams)

- Mya crispata – Zirfaea crispata
- Mya truncata – truncate softshell
- Mya arenaria – common softshell
- Mya lutraria – Lutraria lutraria, the common otter shell
- Mya pictorum – Unio pictorum, the painter's mussel
- Mya margaritifera – Margaritifera margaritifera, the freshwater pearl mussel
- Mya perna – Perna Perna, the brown mussel

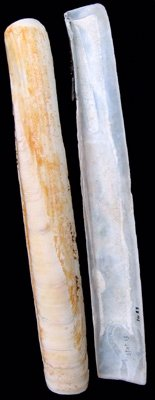
The pod razor was named Solen siliqua in 1758.

- Mya vulsella – Vulsella vulsella

Solen (razor clams)

- Solen vagina
- Solen siliqua – Ensis siliqua, the pod razor
- Solen ensis – Ensis ensis
- Solen legumen – Pharus Legumen, the bean razor
- Solen cultellus – Ensiculus cultellus
- Solen radiatus – Siliqua Radiata
- Solen strigilatus – Solecurtus strigilatus, the rosy razor
- Solen anatinus – Laternula anatina
- Solen bullatus
- Solen inaequivalvis – Pandora inaequivalvis

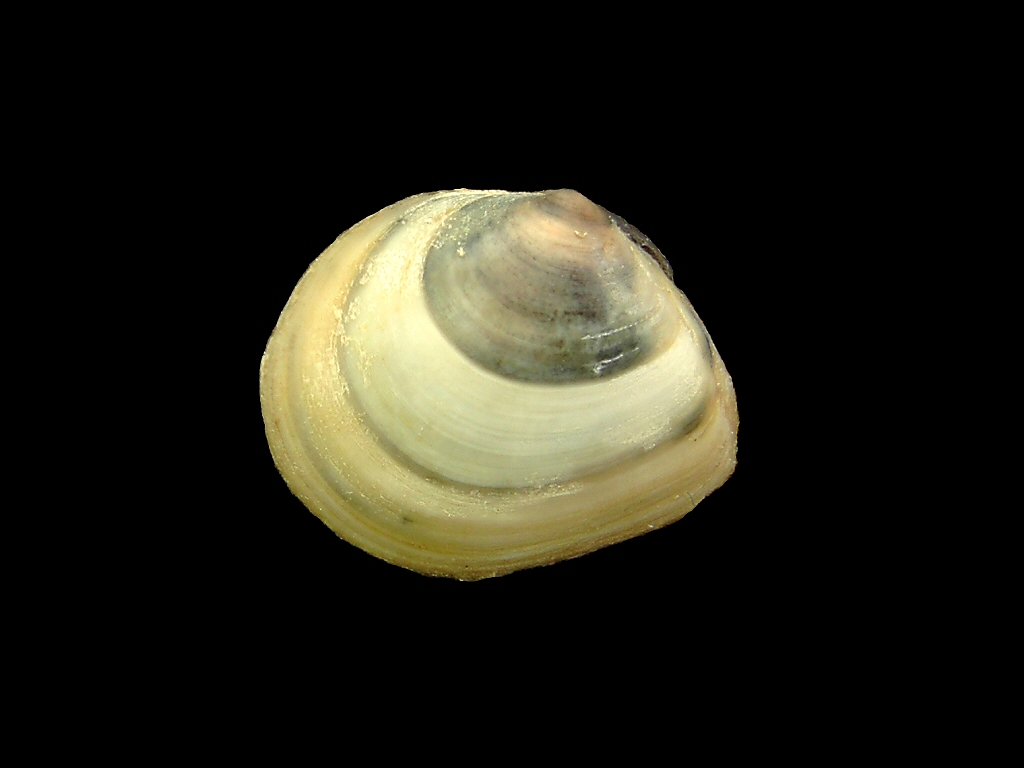
The Baltic tellin was named Tellina balthica in 1758.

Tellina (tellins)

- Tellina gargadia – Quadrans gargadia
- Tellina linguafelis – Scutarcopagia linguafelis
- Tellina virgata – Tellinela virgata
- Tellina gari – Gari truncata
- Tellina fragilis – Gastrana fragilis
- Tellina albida
- Tellina foliacea – Phylloda foliacea
- Tellina planata – Peronaea planata
- Tellina laevigata – Laciolina laevigata
- Tellina radiata – sunrise Tellin
- Tellina rostrata – Dallitellina rostrata
- Tellina trifasciata – Latona trifasciata
- Tellina incarnata – Bosemprella incarnata
- Tellina donacina – Moerella donacina
- Tellina balaustina – Arcopella balaustina
- Tellina remies – Cyclotellina remies
- Tellina scobinata – Scutarcopagia scobinata
- Tellina lactea
- Tellina carnaria – Strigilla carnaria
- Tellina bimaculata – Heterodonax bimaculatus
- Tellina balthica – Limecola balthica, the baltic tellin
- Tellina pisiformis – Strigilla pisiformis
- Tellina divaricata – Lucinella divaricata, the divaricate Lucine
- Tellina digitaria – Digitaria digitaria
- Tellina cornea

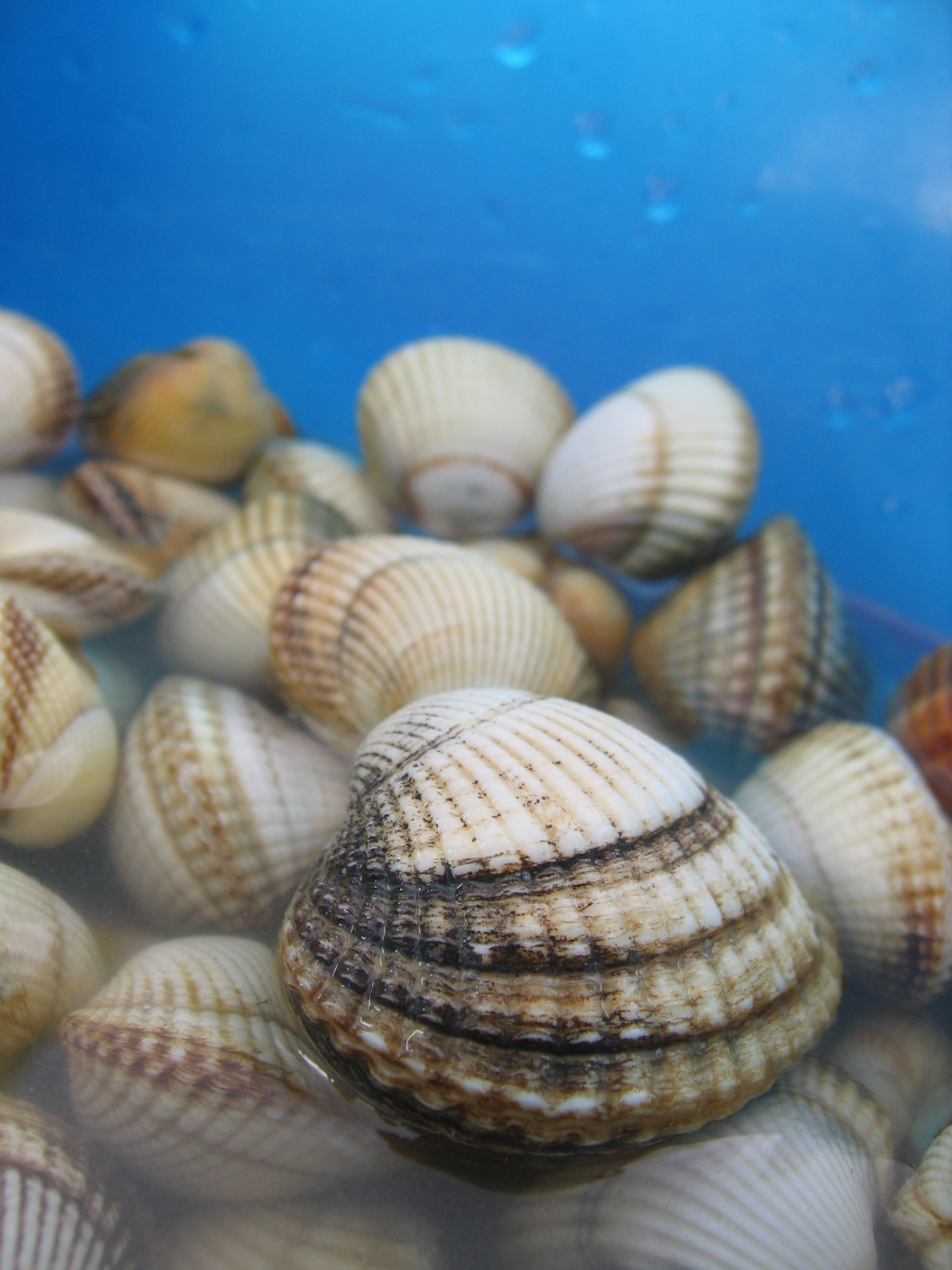
The common cockle was named Cardium edule in 1758.

Cardium (cockles)

- Cardium costatum
- Cardium cardissa – Corculum cardissa, the heart cockle
- Cardium hemicardium – Lunulicardia hemicardium
- Cardium medium – Americardia media, the Atlantic strawberry cockle
- Cardium muricatum – Acanthocardia aculeata, the spiny cockle
- Cardium echinatum – Acanthocardia echinata, the prickly cockle
- Cardium ciliare
- Cardium tuberculatum – Acanthocardia tuberculata, the rough cockle
- Cardium isocardia – Trachycardium isocardia, the West Indian prickly cockle
- Cardium fragum – Fragum fragum, white strawberry cockle
- Cardium unedo – Fragum unedo, Pacific strawberry cockle
- Cardium muricatum – Dallocardia muricata, the yellow prickly cockle
- Cardium magnum – Acrosterigma magnum, the magnum cockle
- Cardium flavum – Vasticardium flavum
- Cardium laevigatum – Fulvia laevigata
- Cardium serratum – Laevicardium serratum
- Cardium triste – synonym of Cardium solidum
- Cardium corallinum – Mactra corallina
- Cardium solidum – Spisula solida, the surf clam
- Cardium edule – Cerastoderma edule, the common cockle
- Cardium rusticum – synonym of Cardium tuberculatum
- Cardium pectinatum –
- Cardium stultorum – Mactra stultorum, the rayed trough shell
- Cardium virgineum
- Cardium humanum – Glossus humanus, the oxheart clam

Donax (wedge shells)

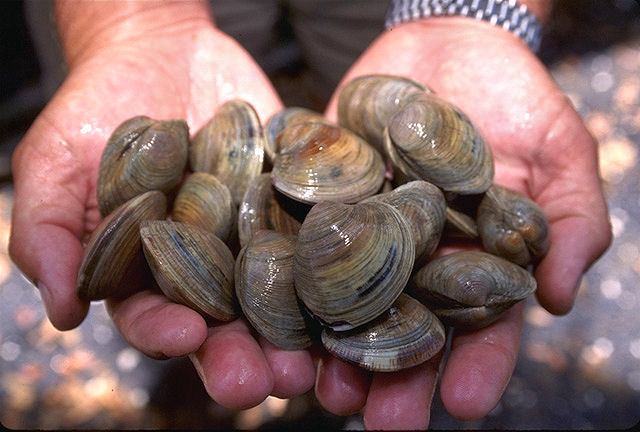
The hard clam was named Venus mercenaria in 1758.

- Donax pubescens – Hecuba Pubescens
- Donax rugosa
- Donax trunculus – truncate donax
- Donax denticulatus
- Donax cuneatus – cradle donax
- Donax scripta
- Donax muricata
- Donax irus – Irus irus, the irus clam

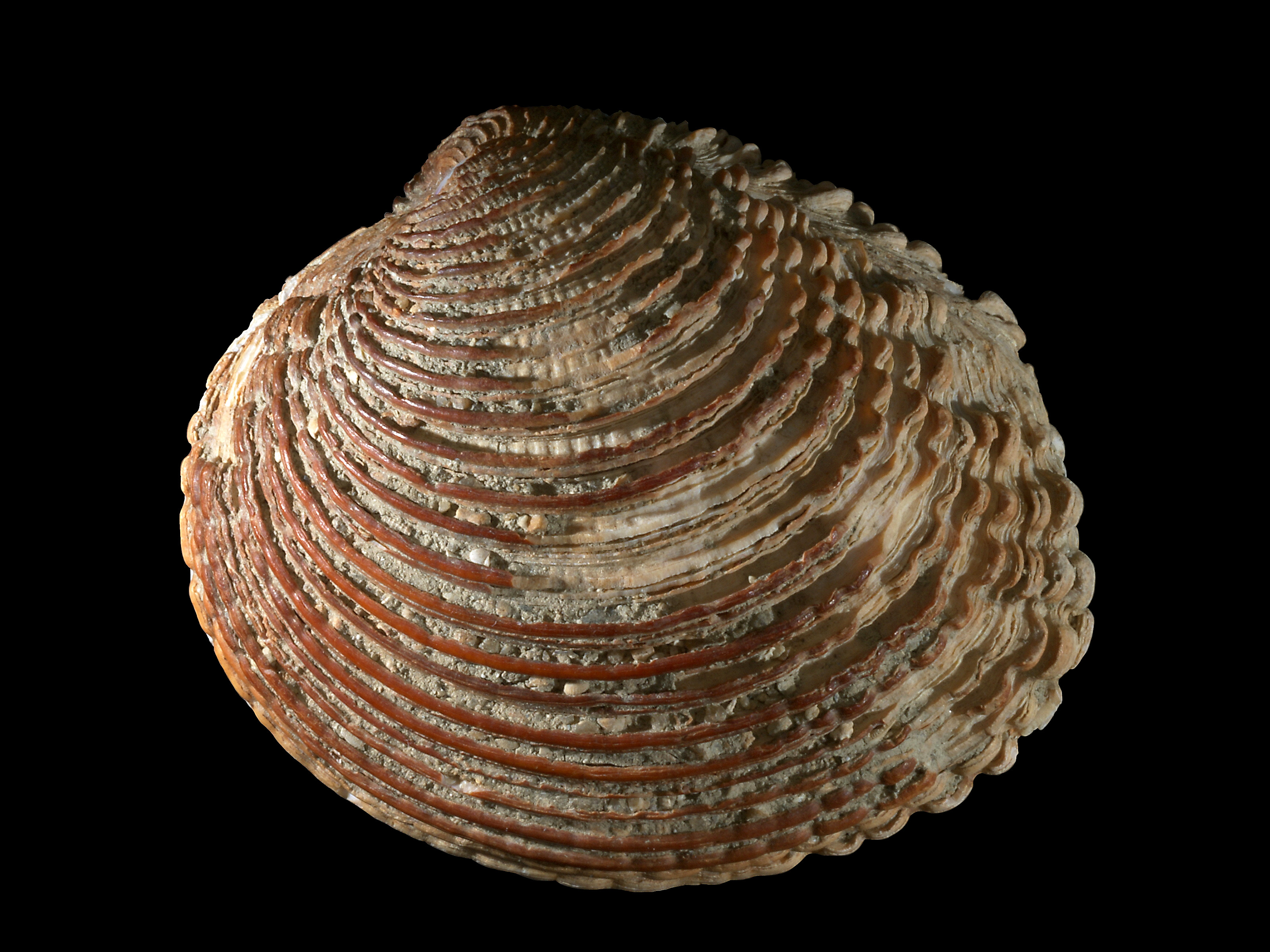
The warty venus was named Venus verrucosa in 1758.

Venus (Venus clams)

- Venus dione – Hysteroconcha dione, the elegant venus clam
- Venus marica – Timoclea marica
- Venus dysera – Chione dysera
- Venus verrucosa – warty venus
- Venus casina
- Venus gallina – Chamelea gallina
- Venus petulca
- Venus erycina – Callista erycina
- Venus mercenaria – Mercenaria mercenaria, the hard clam
- Venus chione – Callista chione, the smooth clam
- Venus maculata – Macrocallista maculata, the calico clam
- Venus meretrix – Meretrix meretrix
- Venus scortum – Hecuba scortum
- Venus laeta – Pitar laetus
- Venus castrensis – Lioconcha castrensis, the zigzag venus
- Venus phryne
- Venus meroë – Sunetta meroe
- Venus deflorata – Asaphis deflorata, the gaudy sanguin
- Venus fimbriata – Fimbria fimbriata
- Venus reticulata – Periglypta reticulata
- Venus squamosa – Anomalodiscus squamosus
- Venus tigerina – Codakia tigerina
- Venus prostrata – Dosinia prostrata
- Venus pensylvanica – Lucina pensylvanica, the pennsylvania lucine
- Venus incrustata
- Venus punctata – Codakia punctata, the punctate codakia
- Venus exoleta – Dosinia exoleta, the rayed artemis
- Venus orbicularis – Codakia orbicularis, the tiger lucine
- Venus ziczac – Protapes ziczac
- Venus pectinata – Gafrarium pectinatum
- Venus scripta – Sunetta scripta
- Venus edentula
- Venus lupinus – Dosinia lupinus, the smooth artemis
- Venus literata – Tapes literatus
- Venus rotundata – Paphia rotundata
- Venus decussata – Ruditapes decussata, the grooved carpet shell

Spondylus (thorny oysters)

- Spondylus gaederopus – European thorny oyster
- Spondylus regius – regal thorny oyster

Chama (jewel box shells)

- Chama lazarus – Lazarus jewel box
- Chama gigas – Tridacna gigas, the giant clam
- Chama hippopus – Hippopus hippopus, the horse hoof clam
- Chama antiquata – Cardites antiquatus
- Chama semiorbiculata – Beguina semiorbiculata
- Chama calyculata – Cardita calyculata
- Chama cordata
- Chama oblonga – Trapezium oblongum
- Chama gryphoides
- Chama bicornis

Arca (ark clams)

- Arca tortuosa – Tricidos tortuosa
- Arca noae – Noah's ark shell
- Arca barbata – Barbatia barbata
- Arca pella – Lembulus pellus
- Arca lactea – Striarca lactea
- Arca antiquata – Anadara antiquata
- Arca senilis – Senilia senilis
- Arca granosa – Tegillarca granosa, the blood cockle
- Arca decussata – Glycimeris decussata, the decussate bittersweet
- Arca pallens
- Arca undata – Glycimeris undata, the Atlantic bittwesweet
- Arca pectunculus – Tucetona pectunculus
- Arca glycymeris – Glycimeris glycimeris, the dog cockle
- Arca nummaria – Glycimeris nummaria
- Arca nucleus – Nucula nucleus

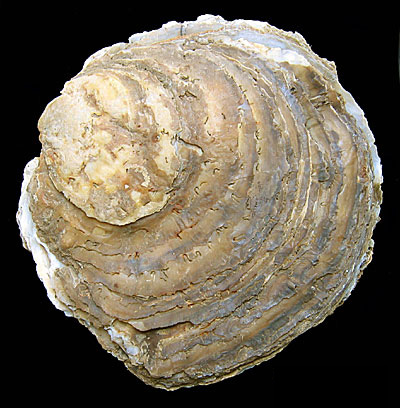
The edible oyster was named Ostrea edulis in 1758.

Ostrea (true oysters)

- Ostrea maxima – Pecten maximus, the great scallop
- Ostrea jacobaea – Pecten jacobaeus, the Mediterranean scallop
- Ostrea ziczac – Euvola ziczac, the zigzag scallop
- Ostrea striatula – Annachlamys striatula
- Ostrea minuta – Haumea minuta
- Ostrea pleuronectes – Amusium pleuronectes
- Ostrea obliterata – Dentamussium obliterata
- Ostrea radula – Decatopecten radula
- Ostrea plica – Decatopecten plica
- Ostrea pallium – Gloripallium pallium
- Ostrea nodosa – Nodipecten nodosus, the lion's law scallop
- Ostrea pes felis – Manupecten pesfelis
- Ostrea pellucens – Caribachlamys pellucens
- Ostrea sanguinea – Mimachlamys sanguinea
- Ostrea varia – Mimachlamys varia, the variegated Scallop
- Ostrea pusio – Talochlamys pusio
- Ostrea glabra – Flexopecten glaber
- Ostrea opercularis – Aequipecten opercularis, the queen scallop
- Ostrea gibba – Aequipecten gibbus, the calico scallop
- Ostrea flavicans – Semipallium flavicans
- Ostrea fasciata – synonym of Flexopecten glaber
- Ostrea lima – Lima lima, the spiny fileclam
- Ostrea isognomum – Isognomon isognomum
- Ostrea malleus – Malleus malleus
- Ostrea folium – Pycnodonta folium
- Ostrea orbicularis
- Ostrea edulis – edible oyster
- Ostrea semiaurita
- Ostrea ephippium – Isognomon ephippium

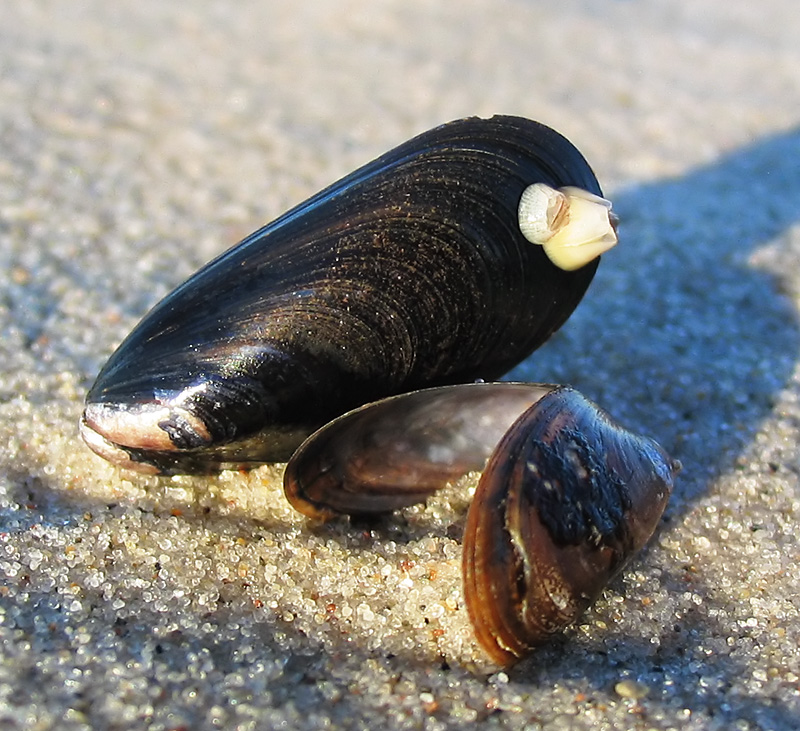
The blue mussel was named Mytilus edulis in 1758.

Anomia (saddle oysters)

- Anomia craniolaris
- Anomia pectinata
- Anomia ephippium – European jingle shell
- Anomia cepa – synonym of Anomia ephippium
- Anomia electrica – synonym of Anomia ephippium
- Anomia squamula – Heteranomia squamula, the prickly jingle
- Anomia scobinata
- Anomia aurita
- Anomia retusa – Terebratulina retusa
- Anomia gryphus
- Anomia pecten
- Anomia striatula
- Anomia reticularis – Atrypa reticularis
- Anomia plicatella
- Anomia crispa
- Anomia lacunosa
- Anomia fareta
- Anomia caput serpentis – Terebratulina caputserpentis
- Anomia terebratula
- Anomia angulata
- Anomia hysterita
- Anomia biloba – Dicoelosia biloba
- Anomia placenta – Placuna placenta, the windwpane oyster

Mytilus – (Mussels including marine and freshwater mussels)

- Mytilus crista galli – Lopha cristagalli, the cockscomb oyster
- Mytilus hyotis – Hyotissa hyotis, the giant honeycomb oyster
- Mytilus frons – Lopha frons
- Mytilus margaritiferus – Margaritifera margaritifera, the freshwater pearl mussel
- Mytilus unguis
- Mytilus lithophagus – Lithophaga lithophaga, the date mussel
- Mytilus bilocularis – Septifer bilocularis
- Mytilus exustus – Brachidontes exustus, the scorched mussel
- Mytilus barbatus – Modiolus barbatus, the bearded horsemussel
- Mytilus edulis – blue mussel
- Mytilus ungulatus – synonym of Mytilus edulis
- Mytilus modiolus – Modiolus modiolus, the northern horsemussel
- Mytilus cygneus – Anodonta cygnea, the swan mussel (a freshwater mussel)
- Mytilus anatinus – Anadonta natina, the duck mussel (a freshwater mussel)
- Mytilus viridis – Perna viridis, the Asian green muscle
- Mytilus ruber – synonym of Mytilus barbatus
- Mytilus hirundor – Pteria hirundo

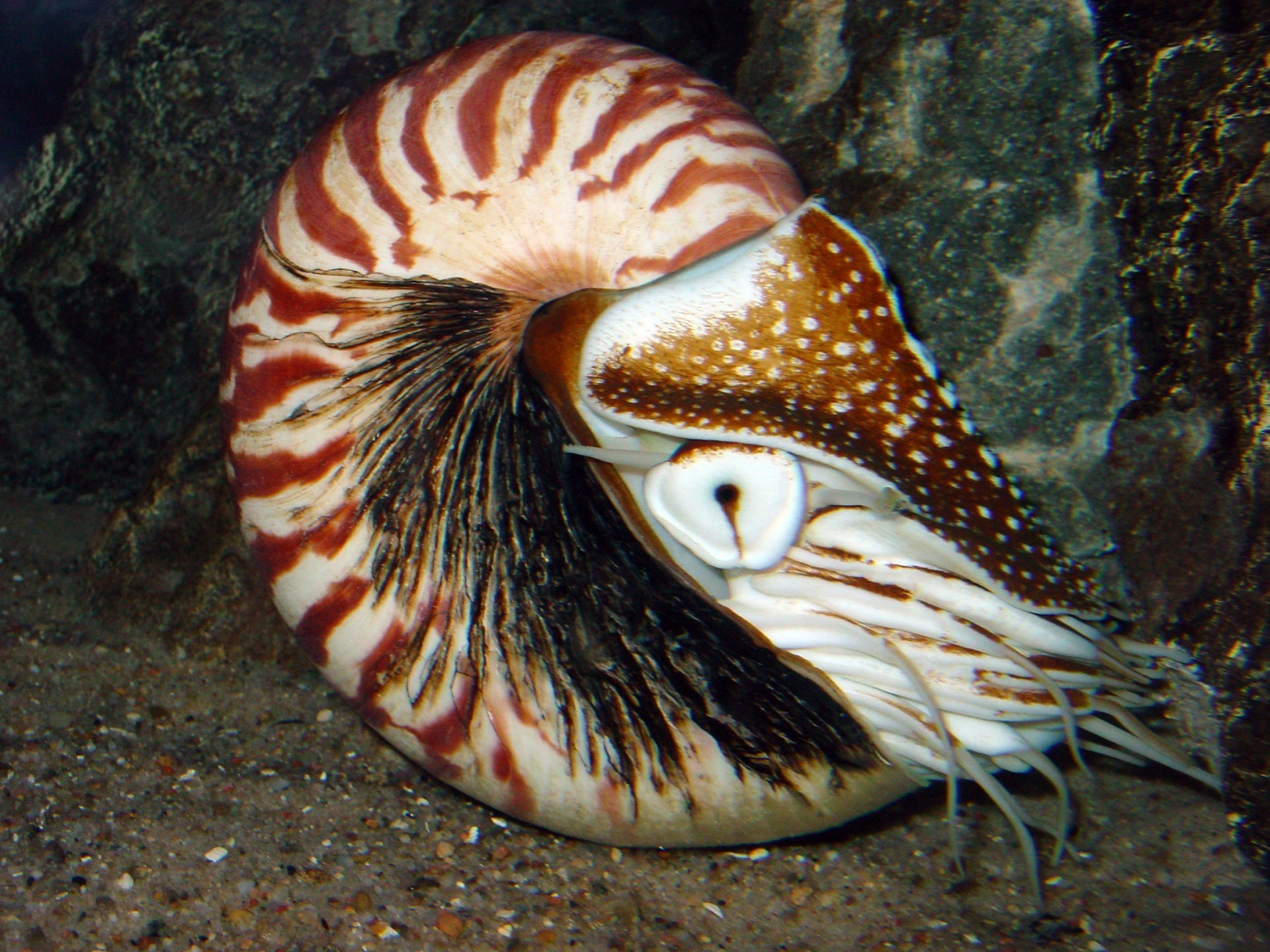
The chambered nautilus was named Nautilus pompilius in 1758.

Pinna (pen shells)

- Pinna rudis – rough penshell
- Pinna nobilis – noble pen shell
- Pinna muricata
- Pinna rotundata
- Pinna saccata – Streptopinna sacatta
- Pinna digitiformis
- Pinna lobata
- Pinna pennacea

Argonauta (paper nautiluses)

- Argonauta argo – greater argonaut
- Argonauta cymbium

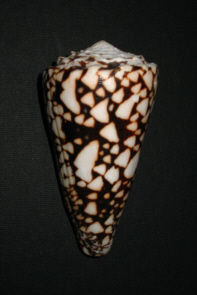
The marbled cone was named Conus marmoreus in 1758.

Nautilus (Nautiluses)

- Nautilus pompilius – chambered nautilus
- Nautilus crista
- Nautilus calcar – Lenticulina calcar
- Nautilus crispus – Elphidium crispum
- Nautilus beccarii – Ammonia beccarii
- Nautilus umbilicatus
- Nautilus spirula – Spirula spirula, the ram's horn squid
- Nautilus Semi-Lituus – Spirolina semilituus
- Nautilus obliquus – Dentalina obliqua
- Nautilus raphanistrum – Pyramidulina raphanistrum
- Nautilus raphanus – Pyramidulina raphanus
- Nautilus granum
- Nautilus radicula – Nodosaria radicula
- Nautilus fascia
- Nautilus sipunculus
- Nautilus legumen – Vaginulina legumen
- Nautilus orthocera

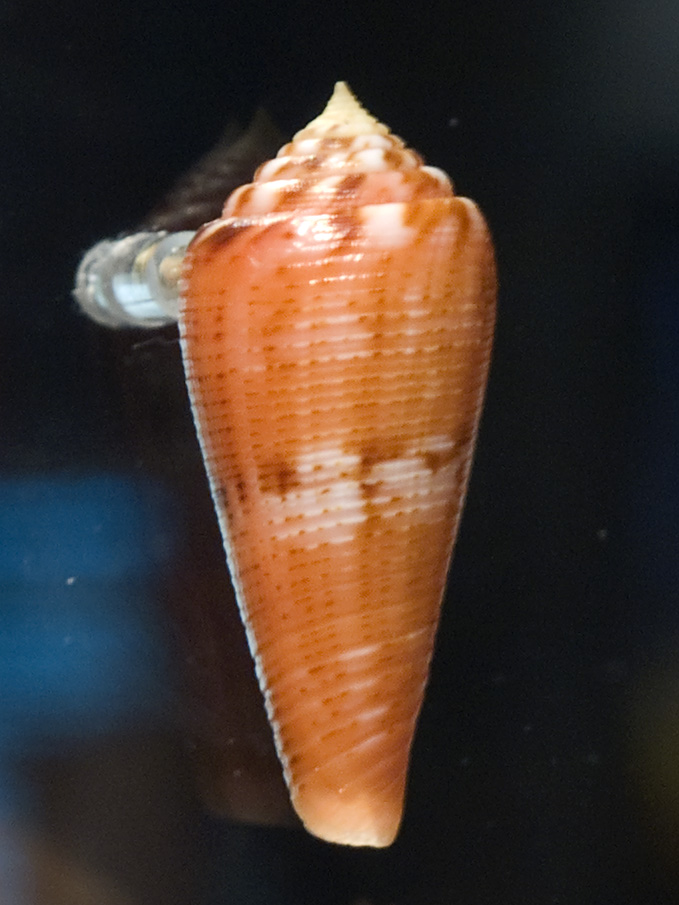
The Glory-of-the-Atlantic cone was named Conus granulatus in 1758.

Conus (Cone Snails)

- Conus marmoreus – marbled cone
- Conus imperialis – imperial cone
- Conus litteratus – lettered cone
- Conus virgo
- Conus capitaneus – captain cone
- Conus miles – soldier cone
- Conus princeps – prince cone
- Conus ammiralis – admiral cone
- Conus senator
- Conus nobilis – noble cone
- Conus genuanus – garter cone
- Conus glaucus – glaucous cone
- Conus monachus – monastic cone
- Conus minimus
- Conus rusticus
- Conus mercator – trader cone
- Conus betulinus – betuline cone
- Conus figulinus – fig cone
- Conus ebraeus – black-and-white cone
- Conus stercus muscarum – fly-specked cone
- Conus varius – freckled cone
- Conus spinosus
- Conus clavus
- Conus nussatella – Nussatella cone
- Conus granulatus – glory-of-the-Atlantic cone
- Conus aurisiacus
- Conus magus – magical cone
- Conus striatus – striated cone
- Conus textile – cloth-of-gold cone
- Conus aulicus – princely cone
- Conus spectrum – spectre cone
- Conus bullatus – bubble cone
- Conus tulipa – tulip cone
- Conus geographus – geography cone
- Conus terebellum – Terebellum terebellum, the Terebellum conch

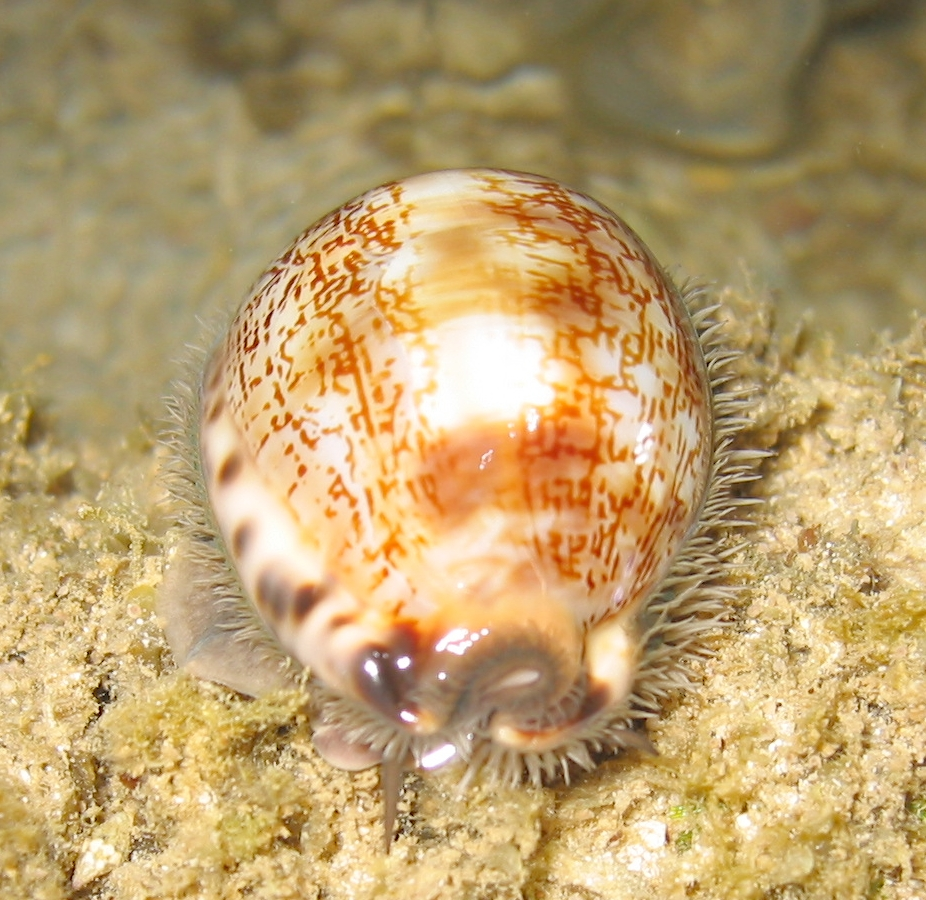
The Arabian cowry was named Cypraea arabica in 1758.

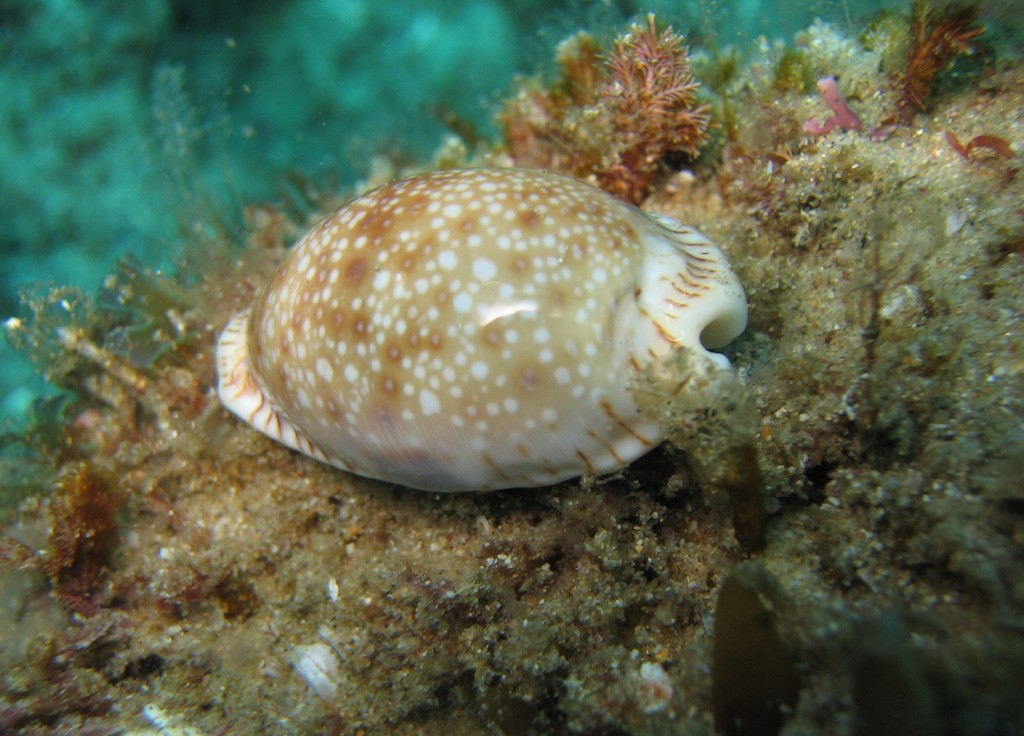
The gnawed cowry was named Cypraea erosa in 1758.

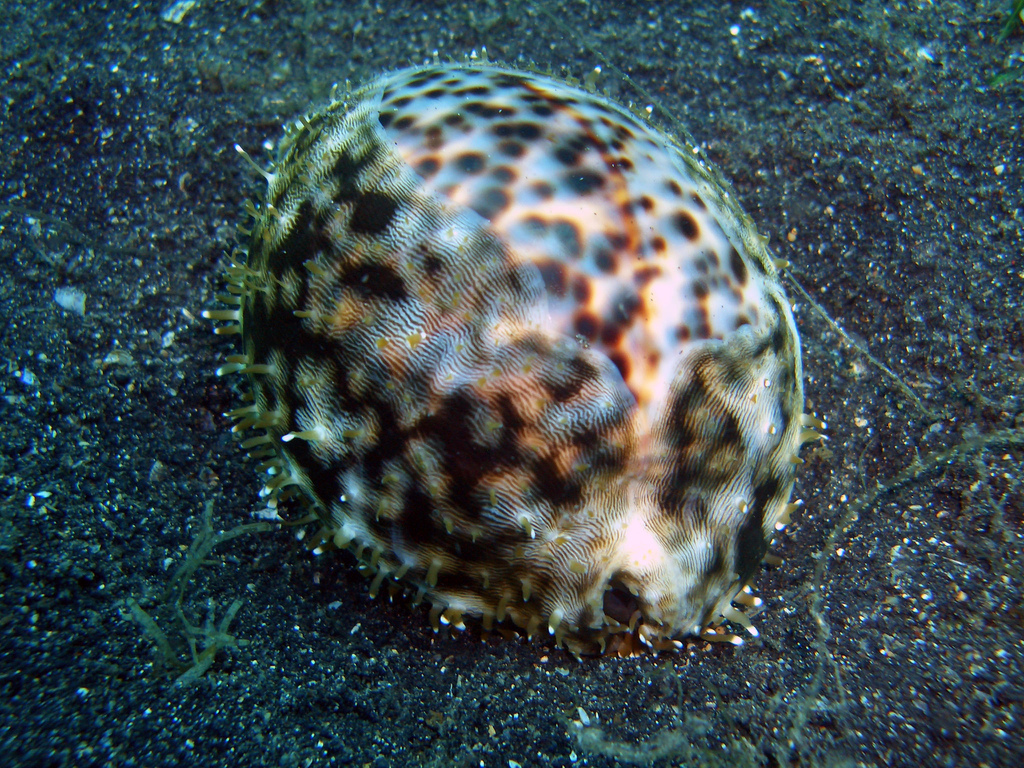
The tiger cowry was named Cypraea tigris in 1758.

Cypraea (Cowries)

- Cypraea mappa – Leporicypraea mappa, the map cowry
- Cypraea arabica – Mauritia arabica, the arabian cowry
- Cypraea argus – Arestorides argus, the eyed cowry
- Cypraea testudinaria – Chelycypraea testudinaria, the turtle cowry
- Cypraea stercoraria – Trona sercoraria, the rat cowry
- Cypraea carneola – Lyncina carneola, the carnelian cowry
- Cypraea zebra – Macrocypraea zebra, the measled cowry
- Cypraea talpa – Talparia talpa, the mole cowry
- Cypraea amethystea
- Cypraea lurida – Lurida lurida
- Cypraea vanelli – synonym of Cypraea lynx
- Cypraea lota
- Cypraea fragilis
- Cypraea caput serpentis – Monetaria caputserpentis, the serpent's-head cowry
- Cypraea mauritiana – Mauritia mauritiana, the humpback cowry
- Cypraea vitellus – Lyncina vitellus, the calf cowry
- Cypraea mus – Muracypraea mus, the mouse cowry
- Cypraea tigris – tiger cowry
- Cypraea lynx – Lyncina lynx, the lynx cowry
- Cypraea isabella – Luria isabella
- Cypraea onyx – Erronea onyx, the onyx cowry
- Cypraea succincta
- Cypraea ziczac – Palmadusta ziczac
- Cypraea hirundo – Bistolida hirundo
- Cypraea asellus – Palmadusta asellus
- Cypraea cribraria – Cribrarula cribraria
- Cypraea errones – Erronea errones, the wandering cowry
- Cypraea moneta – Monetaria moneta, the money cowry
- Cypraea caurica – Erronea caurica, the thick-edged cowry
- Cypraea annulus – Monetaria annulus, the gold ring cowry
- Cypraea erosa – Naria erosa, the gnawed cowry
- Cypraea helvola – Naria helvola, the honey cowry
- Cypraea spurca – Naria spurca, the dirty cowry
- Cypraea stolida – Bistolida stolida, the stolid cowry
- Cypraea ocellata – Naria ocellata, the ocellate cowry
- Cypraea flaveola
- Cypraea poraria – Naria poraria, the porous cowry
- Cypraea pediculus – Pusula pediculus, the coffee bean trivia
- Cypraea nucleus – Nucleolaria nucleus, the wrinkled cowry
- Cypraea staphylaea – Staphylaea staphylaea, the stippled cowry
- Cypraea cicercula – Pustularia cicercula
- Cypraea globulus – Pustularia globulus

Bulla (bubble shells)

- Bulla ovum – Ovula ovum, the common egg cowry
- Bulla volva – Volva volva
- Bulla spelta – Simnia spelta
- Bulla verrucosa – Calpurnus verrucosus, the warty egg cowry
- Bulla gibbosa – Cyphoma gibbosum, the flamingo tongue snail
- Bulla naucum – Atys naucum, the white nut sheath bubble
- Bulla hydatis – Haminoea hydatis
- Bulla ampulla – Pacific bulla
- Bulla lignaria – Scaphander lignarius, the woody canoe-bubble
- Bulla physis – Hydatina physis, the striped paper bubble
- Bulla amplustre – Hydatina amplustre, the royal paper bubble
- Bulla pallida – Hyalina pallida
- Bulla canaliculata – Tonna canaliculata
- Bulla fontinalis – Physa fontinalis, the common bladder snail
- Bulla hypnorum
- Bulla cypraea
- Bulla tornatilis – Acteon tornatilis
- Bulla achatina – Achatina achatina, the giant African snail
- Bulla Auris Midae – Ellobium aurismidae, the Midas' ear shell
- Bulla Auris Judae – Ellobium aurisjudae
- Bulla solidula – Pupa solidula, the solid pupa
- Bulla livida
- Bulla coffea – Melampus coffea, the coffee bean snail

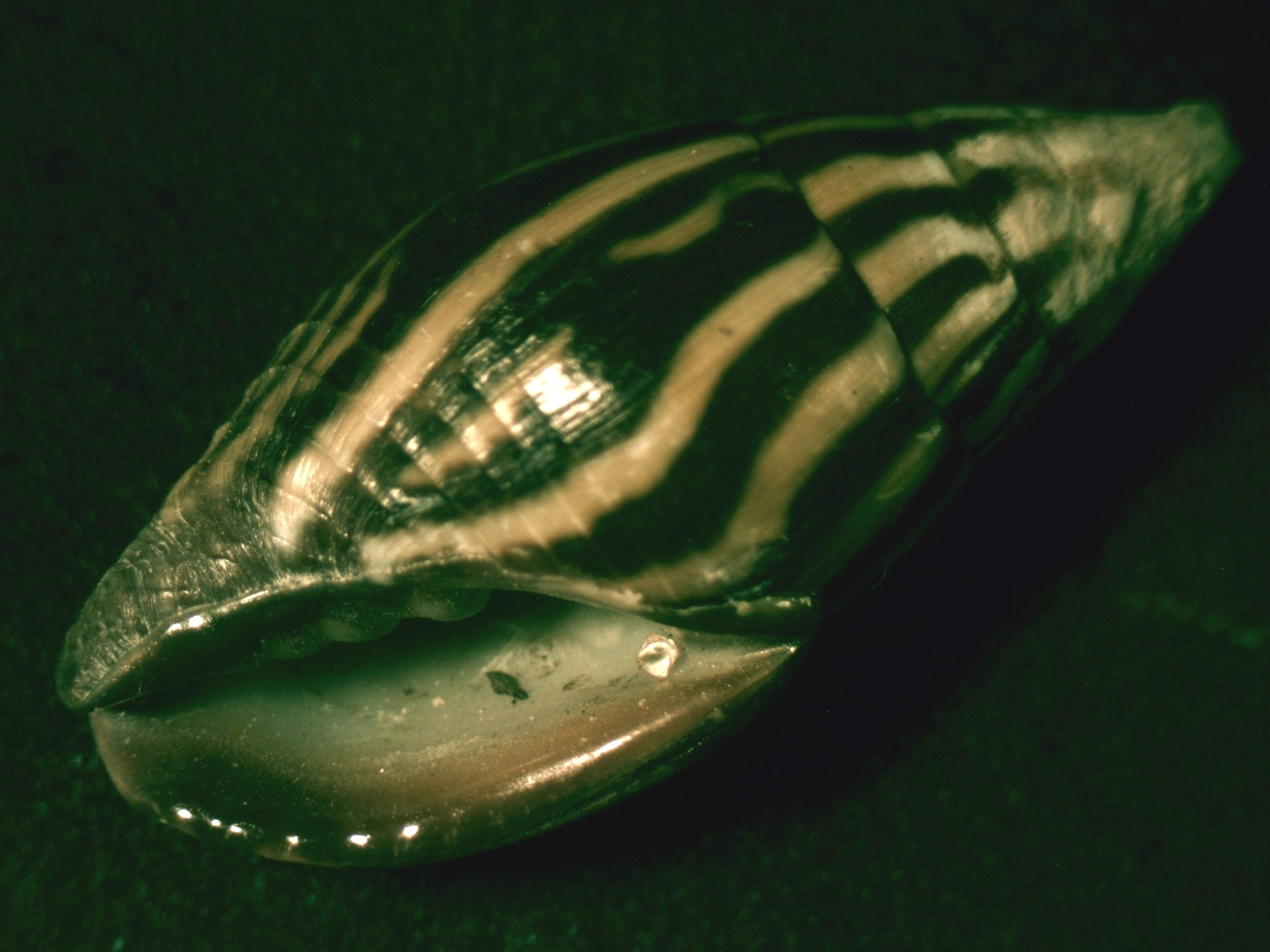
Mitra paupercula was named Voluta paupercula in 1758.

Voluta (volutes)

- Voluta porphyria – Oliva porphyria, the tent olive
- Voluta oliva – Oliva oliva
- Voluta ispidula – Agaronia ispidula
- Voluta persicula – Persicula persicula, the spotted marginella
- Voluta monilis – Volvarina monilis
- Voluta miliaria – Gibberula milaria
- Voluta faba – Glabella faba
- Voluta glabella – Marginella glabella
- Voluta mercatoria – Columbella mercatoria
- Voluta rustica – Columbella rustica
- Voluta paupercula – Strigatella paupercula
- Voluta mendicaria – Engina mendicaria, the bumble bee snail
- Voluta tringa – synonym of Voluta rustica
- Voluta cornicula – Episcomitra cornicula
- Voluta caffra – Vexillum caffrum
- Voluta sanguisuga – Vexillum sanguisuga, the branded mitre
- Voluta vulpecula – Vexillum vulpecula
- Voluta plicaria – Vexillum plicarium
- Voluta pertusa – Chrysame pertusa
- Voluta mitra episcopalis – Mitra mitra, the episcopal mitre
- Voluta mitra papalis – Mitra papalis, the pontifical mitre
- Voluta musica – music volute
- Voluta vespertilio – Cymbiola vespertilio, the bat volute
- Voluta ebraea – Hebrew volute
- Voluta aethiopica – Melo aethiopicus, the crowned baler
- Voluta cymbium – Cymbium cymbium, the false elephant's snout volute
- Voluta olla – Cymbium olla, the Algarve volute

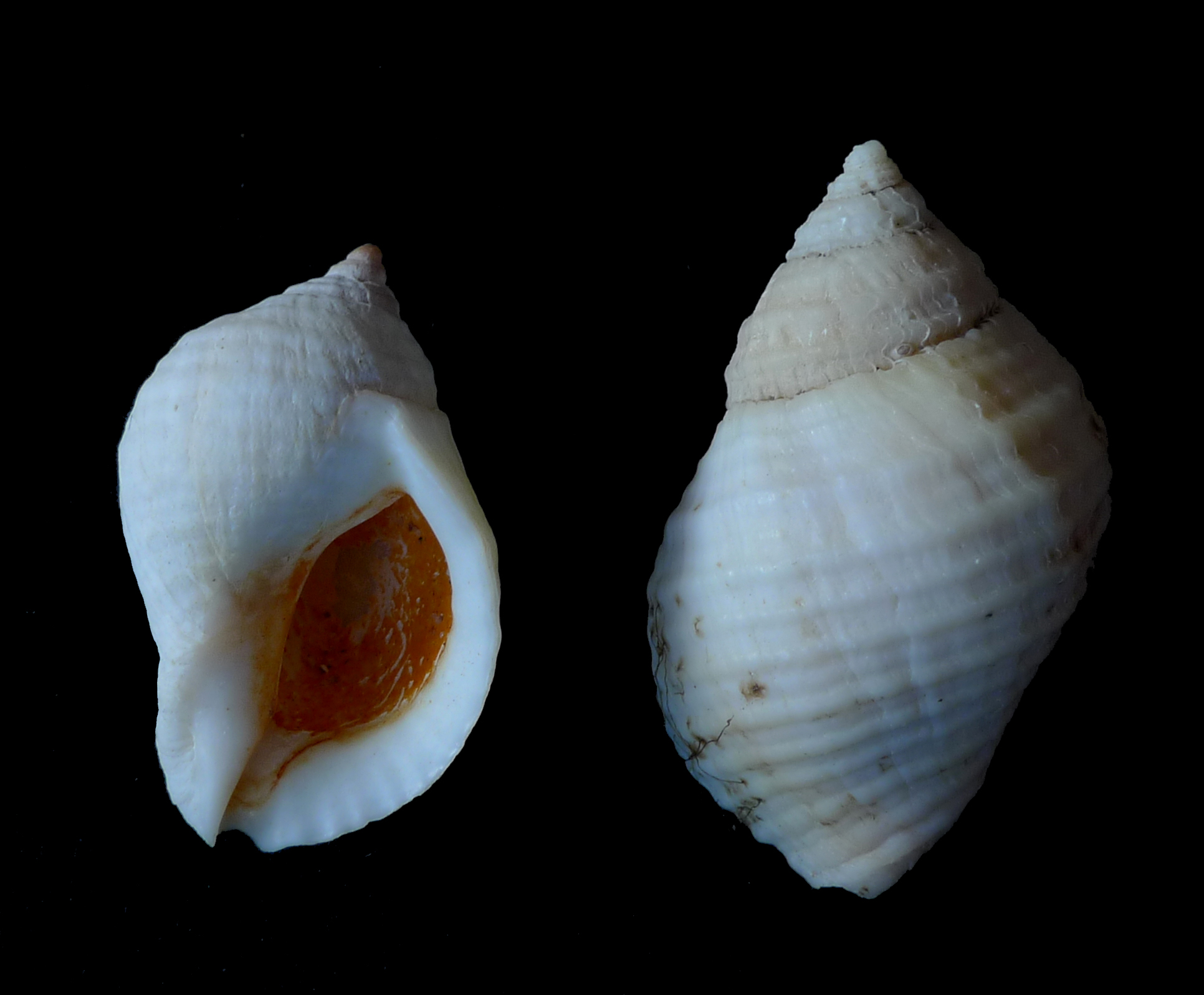
The dog whelk was named Buccinum lapillus in 1758.

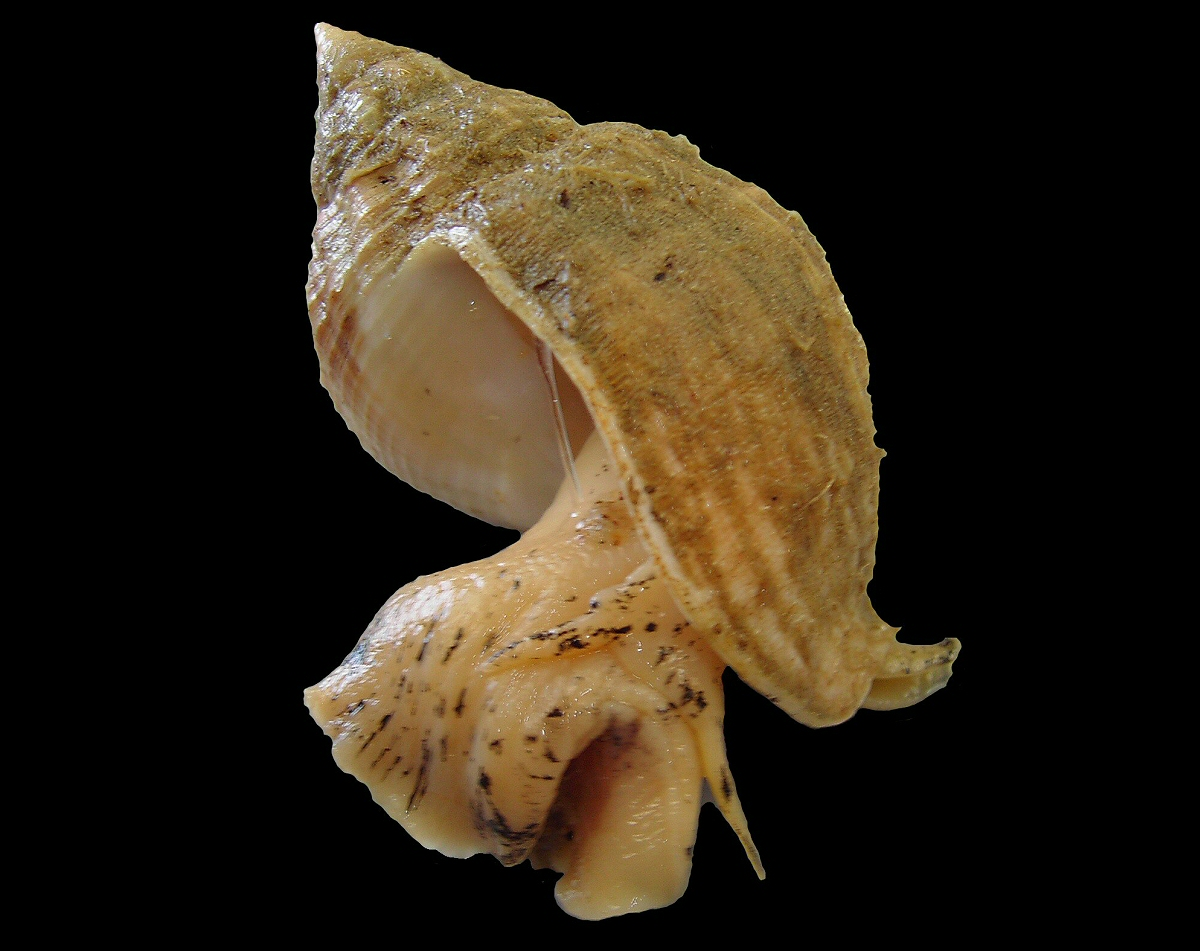
The common whelk was named Buccinum undatum in 1758.

Buccinum (true whelks)

- Buccinum olearium – synonym of Buccinum galea
- Buccinum galea – Tonna galea, the giant tun
- Buccinum perdix – Tonna perdix, the partridge tun
- Buccinum pomum – Malea pomum, the Pacific grinning tun
- Buccinum dolium – Tonna dolium, the spotted tun
- Buccinum echinophorum – Galeodea echinophora, the spiny bonnet
- Buccinum tuberosum – Cassis tuberosa, the king helmet
- Buccinum plicatum – synonym of Buccinum flammeum
- Buccinum cornutum – Cassis cornuta, the corned helmet
- Buccinum rufum – Cypraecassis rufa
- Buccinum flammeum – Cassis flammea
- Buccinum testiculus – Cypraecassis testicula, the reticulated cowry helmet
- Buccinum decussatum – Phalium decussatum
- Buccinum areola – Phalium areola, the checkerboard bonnet
- Buccinum erinaceus – Casmaria erinaceus, the common bonnet
- Buccinum glaucum – Phalium glaucum, the grey bonnet
- Buccinum vibex – synonym of buccinum erinaceus
- Buccinum papillosum – Nassarius papillosus, the pimpled nassa
- Buccinum glans – Nassarius glans, the acorn dog whelk
- Buccinum arcularia – Nassarius arcularia, the casket nassa
- Buccinum pullus – Nassarius pullus, the black nassa
- Buccinum gibbosulum – Tritia gibbosula, the swollen nassa
- Buccinum mutabile – Tritia mutabilis, the mutable nassa
- Buccinum neriteum – Tritia neritea
- Buccinum harpa – Harpa harpa, the true harp
- Buccinum costatum – Harpa costata, the ribbed harp
- Buccinum persicum – Purpura persica, the Persian purpura
- Buccinum patulum – Plicopurpura patula
- Buccinum lapillus – Nucella lapillus, the dog whelk
- Buccinum smaragdulus – Latirolagena smaragdula
- Buccinum spiratum – Babylonia spirata, the spiral Babylon
- Buccinum glabratum – Eburna glabrata
- Buccinum virgineum
- Buccinum praemorsum
- Buccinum undosum – Pollia undosa, the waved goblet
- Buccinum undatum – common whelk
- Buccinum reticulatum – Tritia reticulata, the netted dog whelk
- Buccinum scabriculum – Pterygia scabricula
- Buccinum nitidulum – Nitidella nitida, the glossy dove shell
- Buccinum laevigatum – Rhombinella laevigata, the smooth dove shell
- Buccinum maculatum – Oxymeris maculata, the marlinspike auger
- Buccinum crenulatum – Oxymeris crenulata, the crenulate auger
- Buccinum hecticum – Hastula hectica, the sandbeach auger
- Buccinum strigilatum – Hastula strigilata, the strigate auger
- Buccinum duplicatum – Duplicaria duplicata, the duplicate auger
- Buccinum dimidiatum – Oxymeris dimidiata, the orange auger
- Buccinum murinum

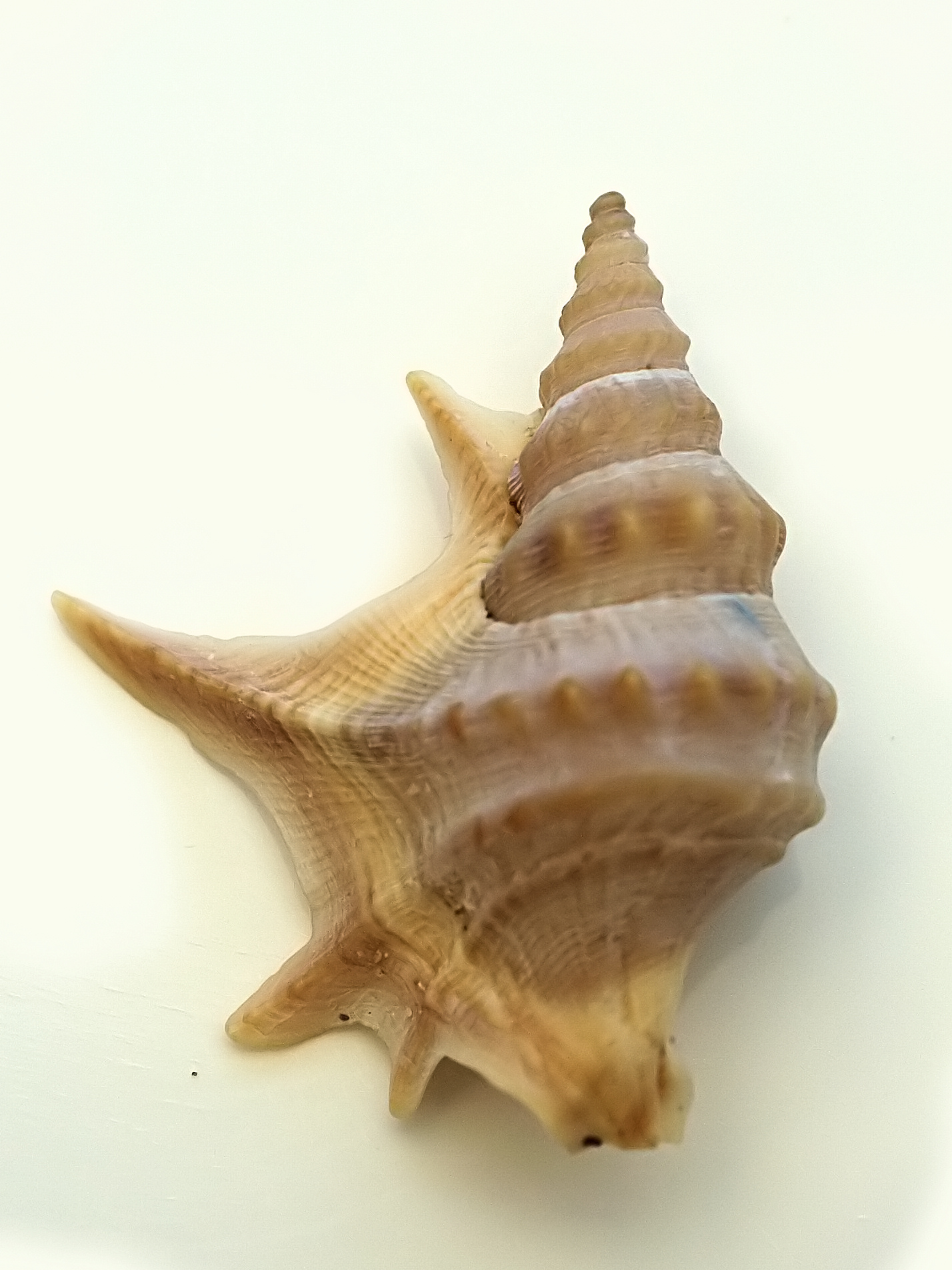
The pelican's foot was named Strombus pes pelecani in 1758.

Strombus (true conchs)

- Strombus pes pelecani – Aporrhais pespelecani, the pelican's foot
- Strombus chiragra – Harpago chiragra, the Chiragra spider conch
- Strombus scorpius – Lambis scorpius, the scorpion conch
- Strombus lambis – Lambis lambis, the scorpion conch
- Strombus millepeda – Lambis millepeda, the millipede conch
- Strombus lentiginosus – Lentigo lentiginosus, the silver conch
- Strombus gallus – Aliger gallus, the rooster conch
- Strombus auris dianae – Euprotomus aurisdianae, the Diana conch
- Strombus pugilis – West Indian fighting conch
- Strombus marginatus – Margistrombus marginatus, the marginate conch
- Strombus luhuanus – Conomurex luhuanus, the strawberry conch
- Strombus gibberulus – Gibberulus gibberulus, the humpbacked conch
- Strombus lucifer – synonym of Strombus gigas
- Strombus gigas – Aliger gigas, the queen conch
- Strombus latissimus – Latissistrombus latissimus
- Strombus epidromis – Labiostrombus epidromis, the swan conch
- Strombus canarium – Laevistrombus canarium
- Strombus vittatus – Doxander vittatus, the vitate snail
- Strombus urceus – Canarium urceus
- Strombus dentatus – Tridentarius dentatus, the toothed conch
- Strombus ater – Faunus ater
- Strombus lividus

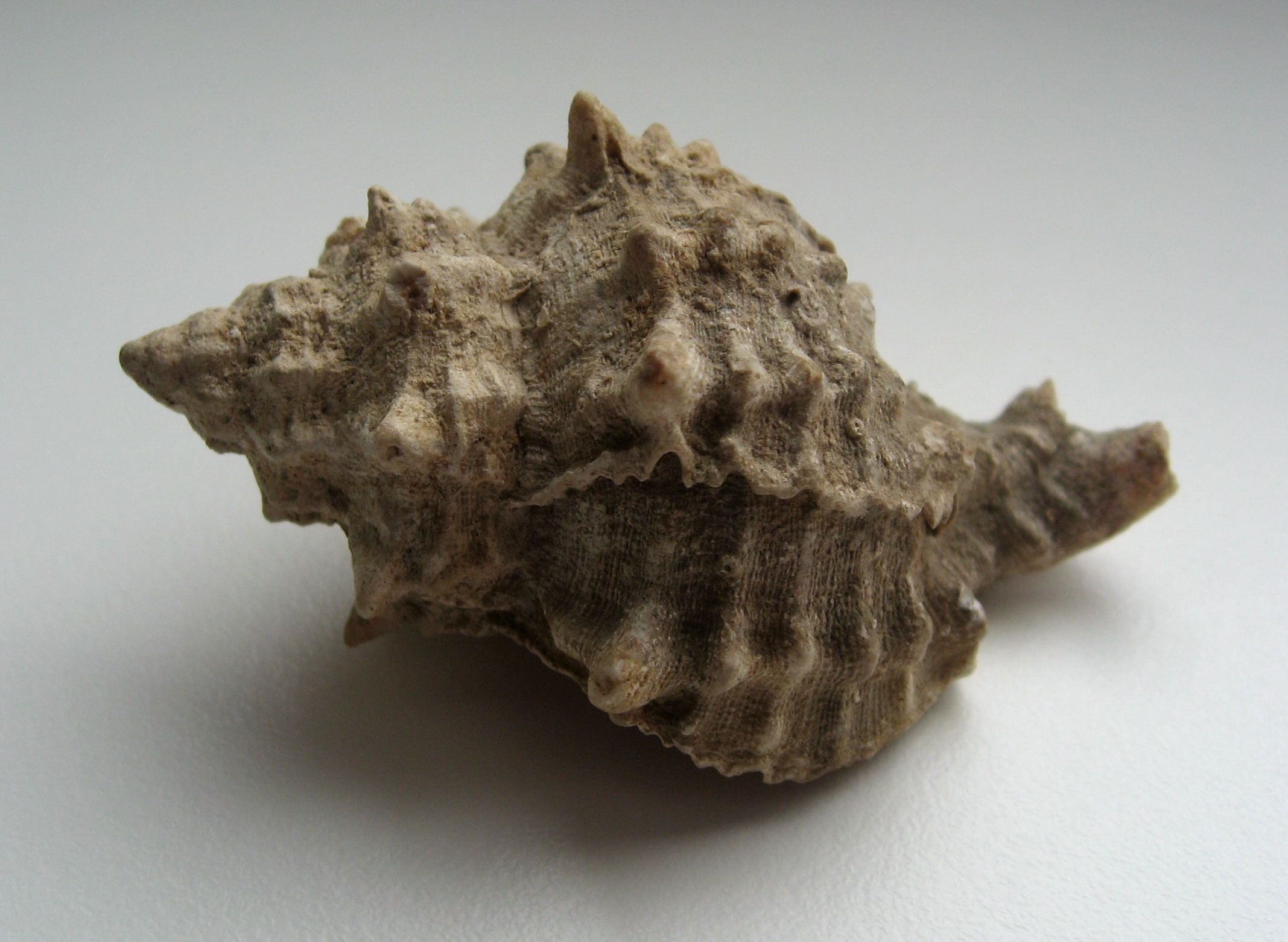
The banded dye murex was named Murex trunculus in 1758.

Murex (Murex Snails)

- Murex haustellum – Haustellum haustellum
- Murex tribulus – caltrop murex
- Murex cornutus – Bolinus cornutus, the horned murex
- Murex brandaris – Bolinus brandaris, the purple dye murex
- Murex trunculus – Hexaplex trunculus, the banded dye murex
- Murex ramosus – Chicoreus ramosus, the ramose murex
- Murex scorpio – Homalocantha scorpio, the scorpion murex
- Murex saxatilis
- Murex erinaceus – Ocenebra erinaceus, the European sting winkle
- Murex rana – Bufonaria rana
- Murex gyrinus – Gyrineum gyrinum
- Murex lampas – Charonia lampas, the pink lady
- Murex olearium – Ranella olearium, the wandering triton
- Murex femorale – Cymatium femorale
- Murex lotorium – Lotoria lotoria, the black-spotted snail
- Murex pileare – Monoplex pilearis, the hairy triton
- Murex rubecula – Septa rubecula, the ruby triton
- Murex scrobilator – Talisman scrobilator
- Murex reticularis – Distorsio reticularis
- Murex pyrum – Ranularia pyrum, the pear triton
- Murex anus – Distorsio anus, the common distorsio
- Murex ricinus – Drupa ricinus
- Murex capitellum – Vasum capitellum, the helmet vase
- Murex turbinellus – Vasum turbinellus
- Murex nodus
- Murex hystrix – synonym of Murex ricinus
- Murex mancinella – Mancinella alouina, the alou rock shell
- Murex ceramicus – Vasum ceramicum, the heavy whelk
- Murex hippocastanum – Tylothais virgata
- Murex melongena – Melongena melongena, the Caribbean crown conch
- Murex scabriculus – Bivetiella cancellata
- Murex senticosus – Phos senticosus, the common Pacific phos
- Murex ficus – Ficus ficus, the paper fig shell
- Murex rapa – Rapa rapa, the bubble turnip
- Murex granum
- Murex fusus – Tibia fusus, the spindle tibia
- Murex babylonius – Turris babylonia, the tower turrid
- Murex colus – Fusinus colus, the distaff spindle
- Murex morio – Pugilina morio, the giant hary melongena
- Murex cochlidium – Volegalea cochlidium, the spiral melongena
- Murex canaliculatus – Busycotypus canaliculatus, the channeled whelk
- Murex aruanus – Sirynx aruanus, the Australian trumpet
- Murex perversus – Sinistrofulgur perversum, the lightning whelk
- Murex antiquus – Neptunea antiqua, the red whelk
- Murex despectus – Neptunea despecta
- Murex tritonis – Charonia tritonis, the Triton's trumpet
- Murex tulipa – Fasciolaria tulipa, the true tulip
- Murex pusio – Pisania pusio
- Murex corneus – Euthria cornea, the spindle euthria
- Murex ligniarius – Tarantinaea lignaria
- Murex trapezium – Pleuroploca trapezium, the trapezium horse conch
- Murex syracusanus – Aptyxis syracusana, the Syracusan spindle shell
- Murex craticulatus – Turrilatirus craticulatus
- Murex scriptus – Mitrella scripta, the music dove shell
- Murex aluco – Pseudovertagus aluco, the aluco vertagus
- Murex fuscatus – Tympanotonos fuscatus, the West African mud creeper
- Murex radula – synonym of Murex fuscatus
- Murex asper – Rhinoclavis aspera
- Murex granulatus – synonym of Murex asper

Trochus (top snails)

- Trochus maculatus – maculated top shell
- Trochus perspectivus
- Trochus hybridus
- Trochus cruciatus
- Trochus pharaonius – strawberry top shell
- Trochus magus
- Trochus modulus
- Trochus muricatus
- Trochus scaber
- Trochus varius – Gibbula varia
- Trochus cinerarius
- Trochus divaricatus
- Trochus umbilicaris – Gibbula umbilicaris
- Trochus vestiarius
- Trochus labio
- Trochus tuber
- Trochus striatus
- Trochus conulus – Calliostoma conulus
- Trochus zizyphinus – Calliostoma zizyphinum
- Trochus telescopium
- Trochus dolabratus
- Trochus perversus
- Trochus punctatus
- Trochus striatellus – Jujubinus striatus

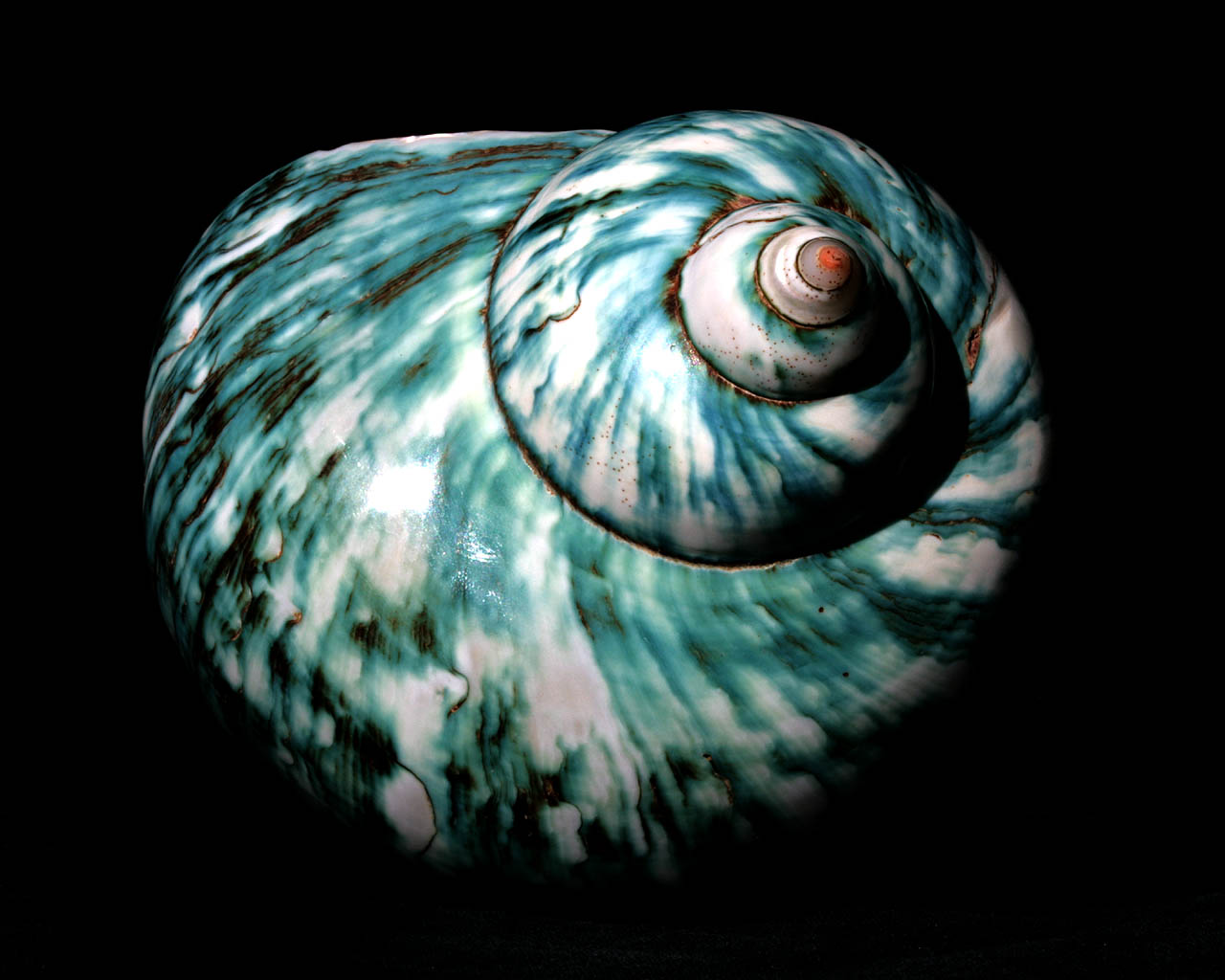
The great green turban was named Turbo marmoratus in 1758.

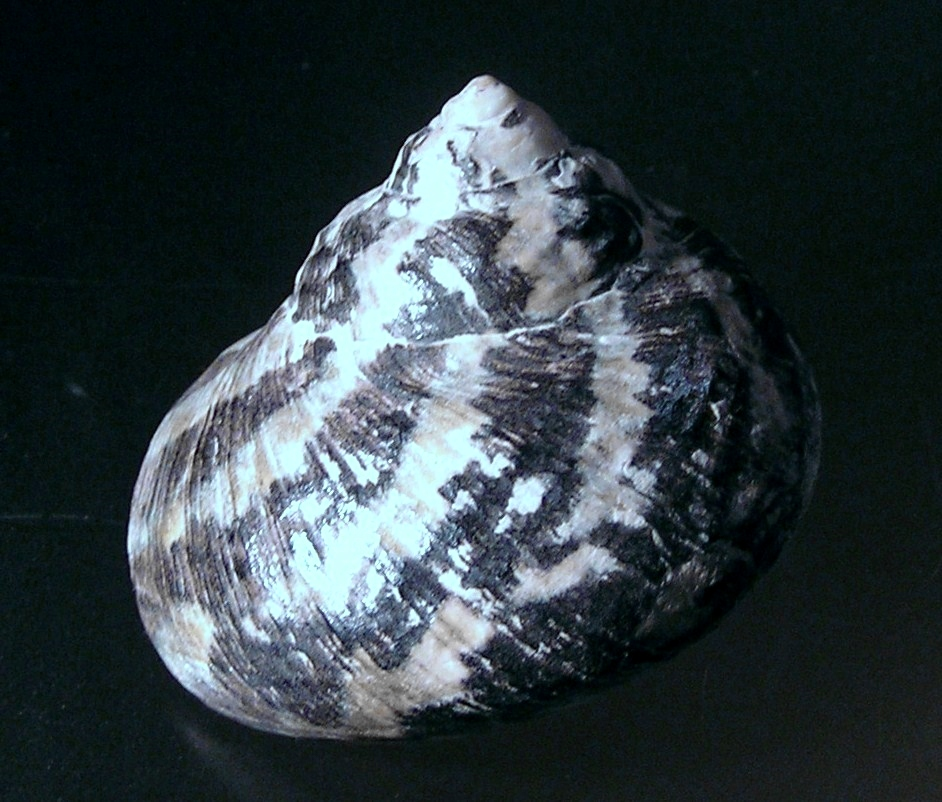
The West Indian top shell was named Turbo pica in 1758.

Turbo (turban snails)

- Turbo obtusatus – flat periwinkle
- Turbo neritoides
- Turbo littoreus
- Turbo muricatus – Cenchritis muricatus
- Turbo cimex
- Turbo pullus
- Turbo personatus
- Turbo petholatus
- Turbo cochlus
- Turbo chrysostomus
- Turbo tectum persicum
- Turbo pagodus
- Turbo calcar
- Turbo marmoratus – great green turban
- Turbo sarmaticus
- Turbo olearius
- Turbo pica – West Indian top shell
- Turbo sanguineus – Homalopoma sanguineum
- Turbo argyrostomus
- Turbo margaritaceus
- Turbo delphinus
- Turbo distortus
- Turbo scalaris
- Turbo clathrus
- Turbo crenatus
- Turbo lacteus
- Turbo striatulus
- Turbo uva
- Turbo corneus
- Turbo reflexus
- Turbo lincina
- Turbo imbricatus
- Turbo replicatus
- Turbo acutangulus
- Turbo duplicatus – Turritella duplicata
- Turbo exoletus – Turritella exoleta
- Turbo terebra – Turritella terebra
- Turbo variegatus – Turritella variegata
- Turbo ungulinus
- Turbo annulatus – Pyrgula annulata
- Turbo bidens – Papillifera bidens
- Turbo perversus
- Turbo muscorum – Pupilla muscorum
- Turbo auriscalpium
- Turbo politus

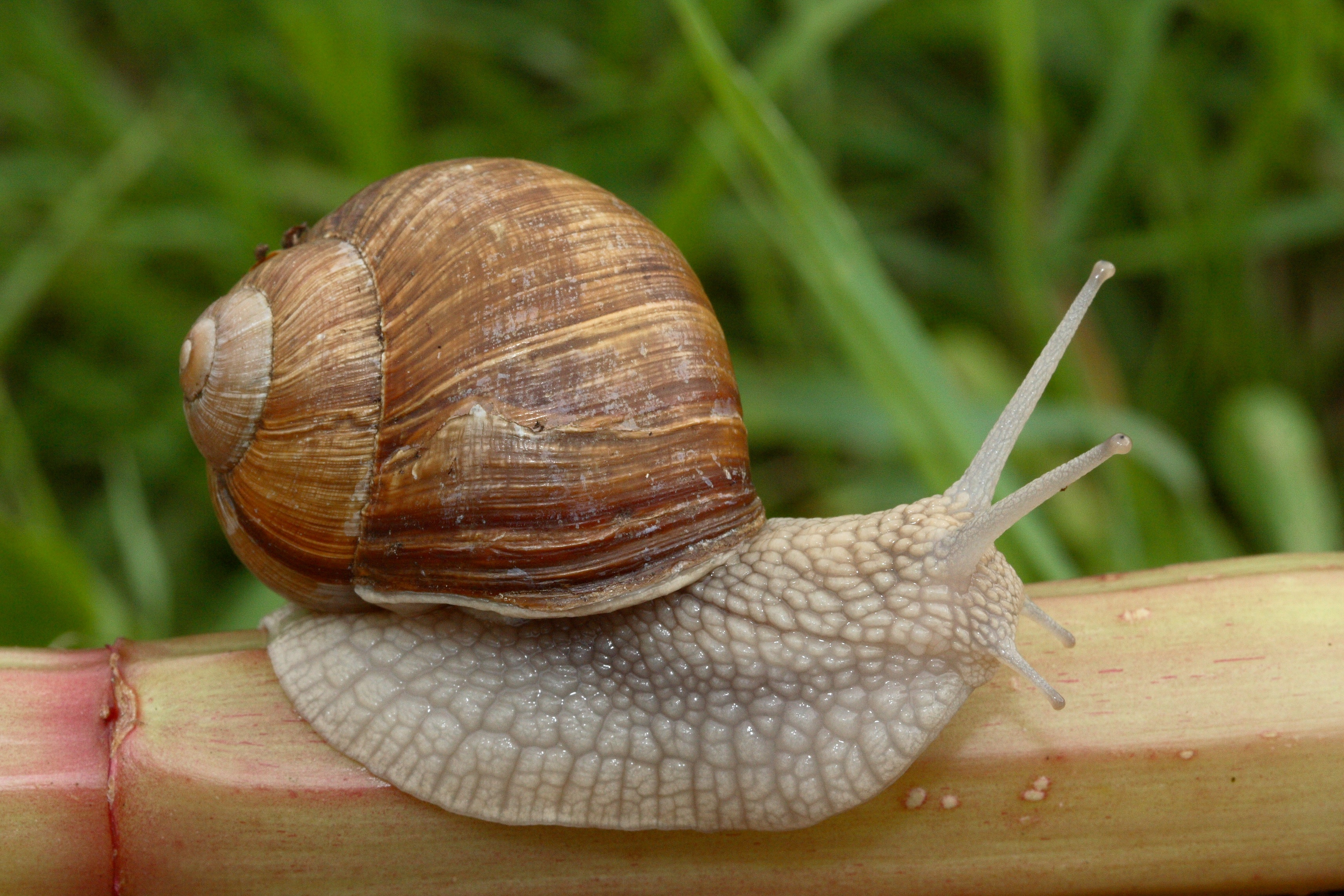
The Roman snail was named Helix pomatia in 1758.

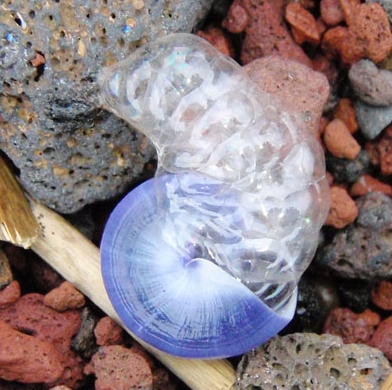
The common purple snail was named Helix janthina in 1758.

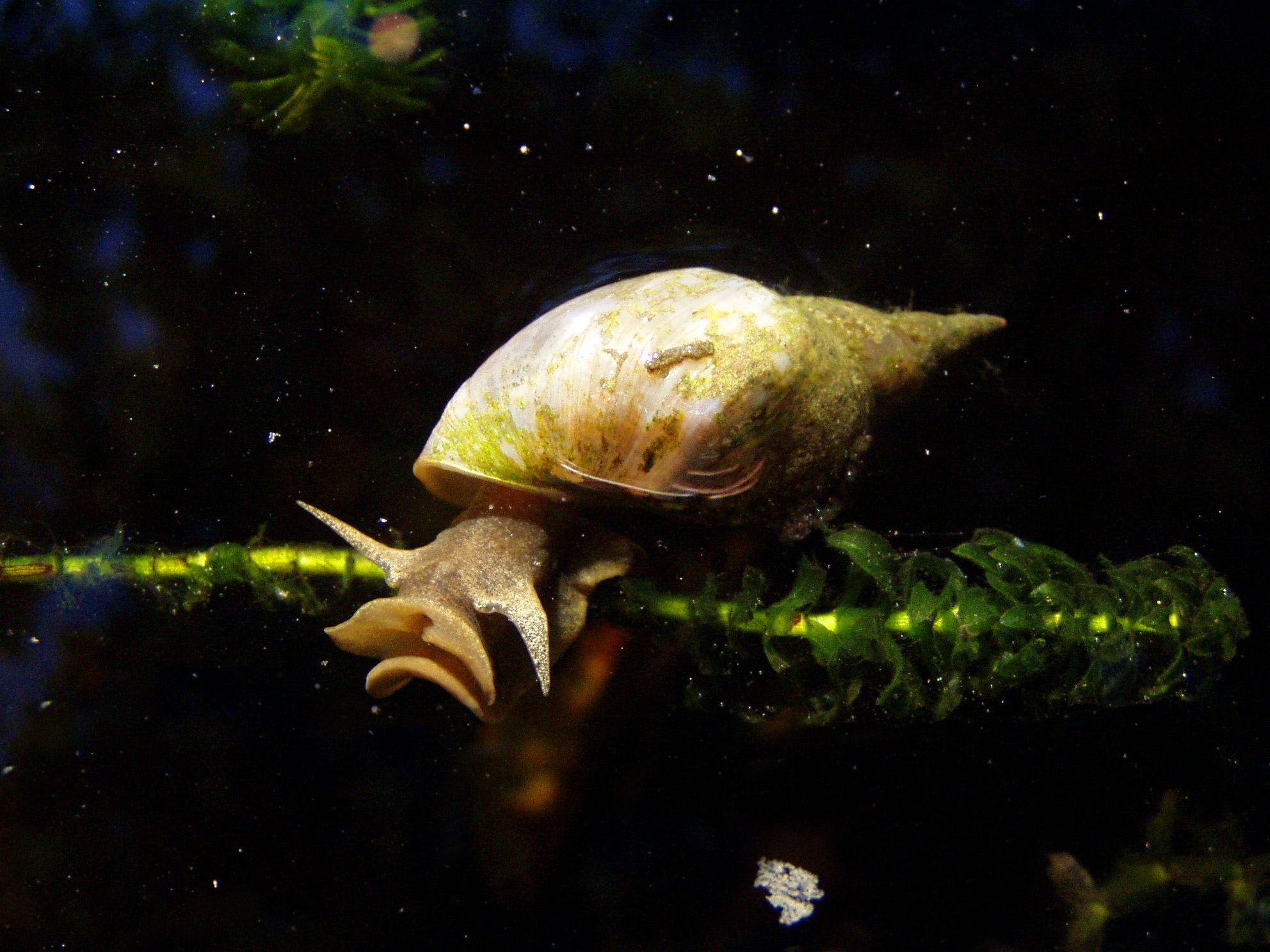
The great pond snail was named Helix stagnalis in 1758.

Helix (land snails)

- Helix scarabaeus
- Helix lapicida
- Helix oculus capri
- Helix albella
- Helix striatula
- Helix algira – Zonites algirus
- Helix leucas
- Helix planorbis
- Helix complanata
- Helix ringens
- Helix carocolla
- Helix cornu militare
- Helix vortex
- Helix scabra – Littoraria scabra, the mangrove periwinkle
- Helix gothica
- Helix gualtierana
- Helix cornea
- Helix spirorbis
- Helix contorta
- Helix cornu arietis
- Helix hispida
- Helix ampullacea
- Helix pomatia – Roman snail
- Helix glauca
- Helix citrina
- Helix arbustorum
- Helix ungulina
- Helix itala
- Helix hispana
- Helix lutaria – Helix lutescens
- Helix perversa
- Helix janthina – common purple snail
- Helix vivipara – Viviparus contectus a freshwater snail
- Helix nemoralis – grove snail
- Helix lucorum
- Helix grisea
- Helix haemastoma
- Helix decollata – decollate snail
- Helix pupa
- Helix barbara
- Helix amarula
- Helix stagnalis – great pond snail
- Helix fragilis
- Helix putris
- Helix limosa
- Helix tentaculata – common bithynia
- Helix auricularia – big-ear radix
- Helix balthica
- Helix neritoidea
- Helix perspicua
- Helix haliotoidea
- Helix ambigua

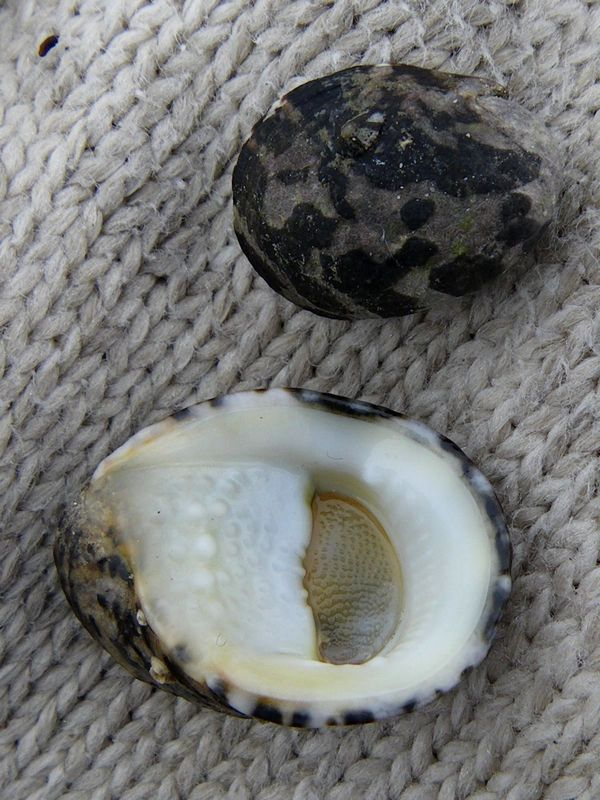
The blotched nerite was named Nerita albicilla in 1758.

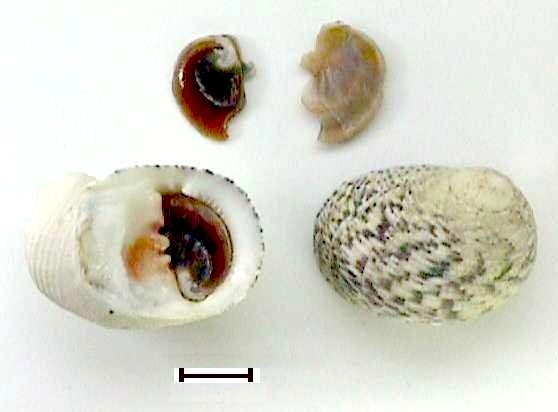
Shell & opercula of Nerita peloronta

Nerita (nerites)

- Nerita canrena
- Nerita glaucina
- Nerita vitellus
- Nerita albumé
- Nerita mammilla
- Nerita nodosa – Thais nodosa
- Nerita corona
- Nerita radula
- Nerita cornea
- Nerita fluviatilis
- Nerita littoralis
- Nerita lacustris
- Nerita bidens
- Nerita viridis
- Nerita virginea
- Nerita polita
- Nerita peloronta – bleeding tooth
- Nerita albicilla – blotched nerite
- Nerita histrio
- Nerita plicata
- Nerita grossa
- Nerita chamaeleon
- Nerita undata
- Nerita exuvia – snakeskin nerite

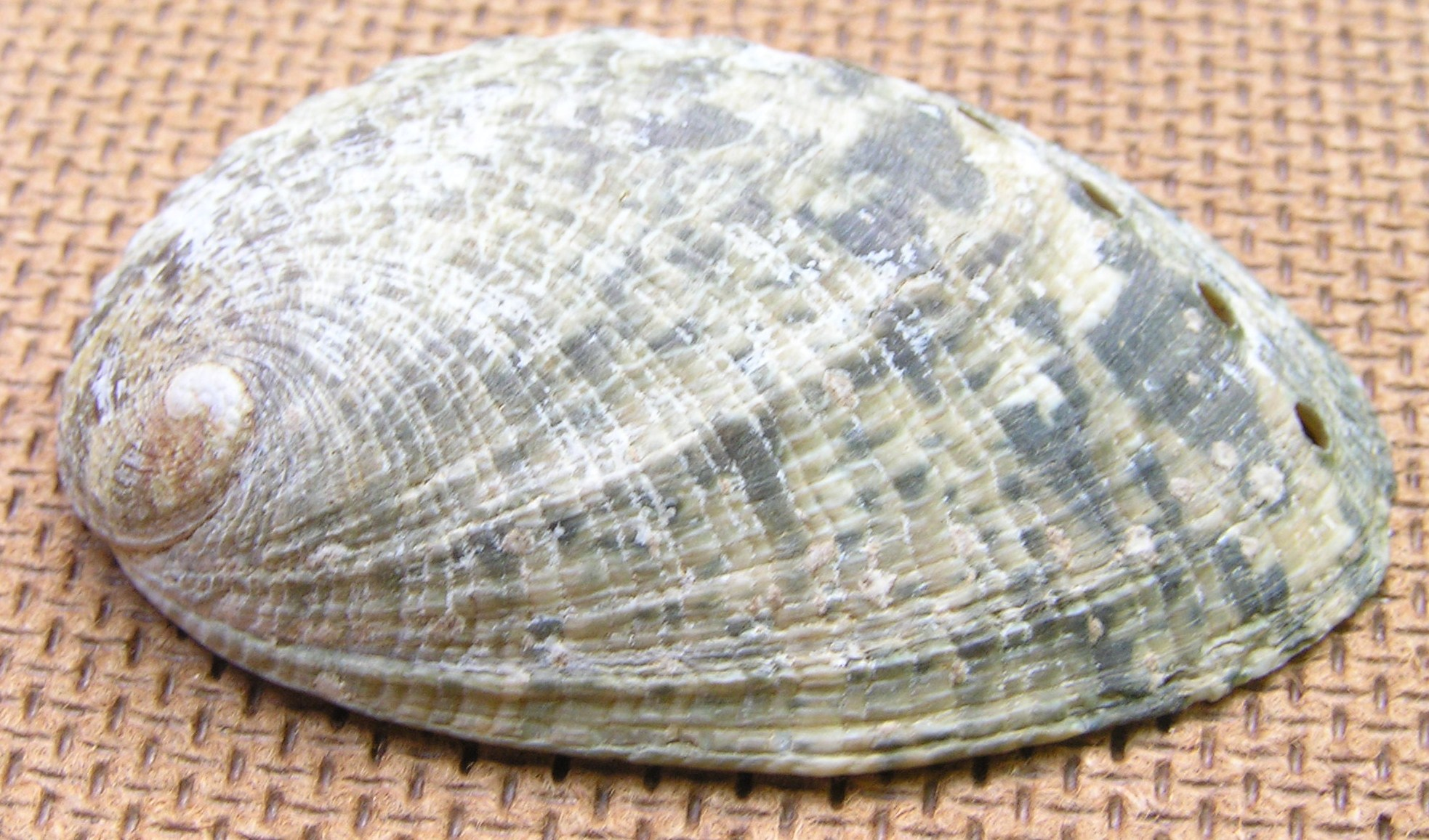
The virgin paua was named Haliotis marmorata in 1758.

Haliotis (abalones)

- Haliotis midae
- Haliotis tuberculata – green ormer
- Haliotis striata
- Haliotis varia
- Haliotis marmorata – virgin paua
- Haliotis asinina – ass's ear abalone
- Haliotis parva

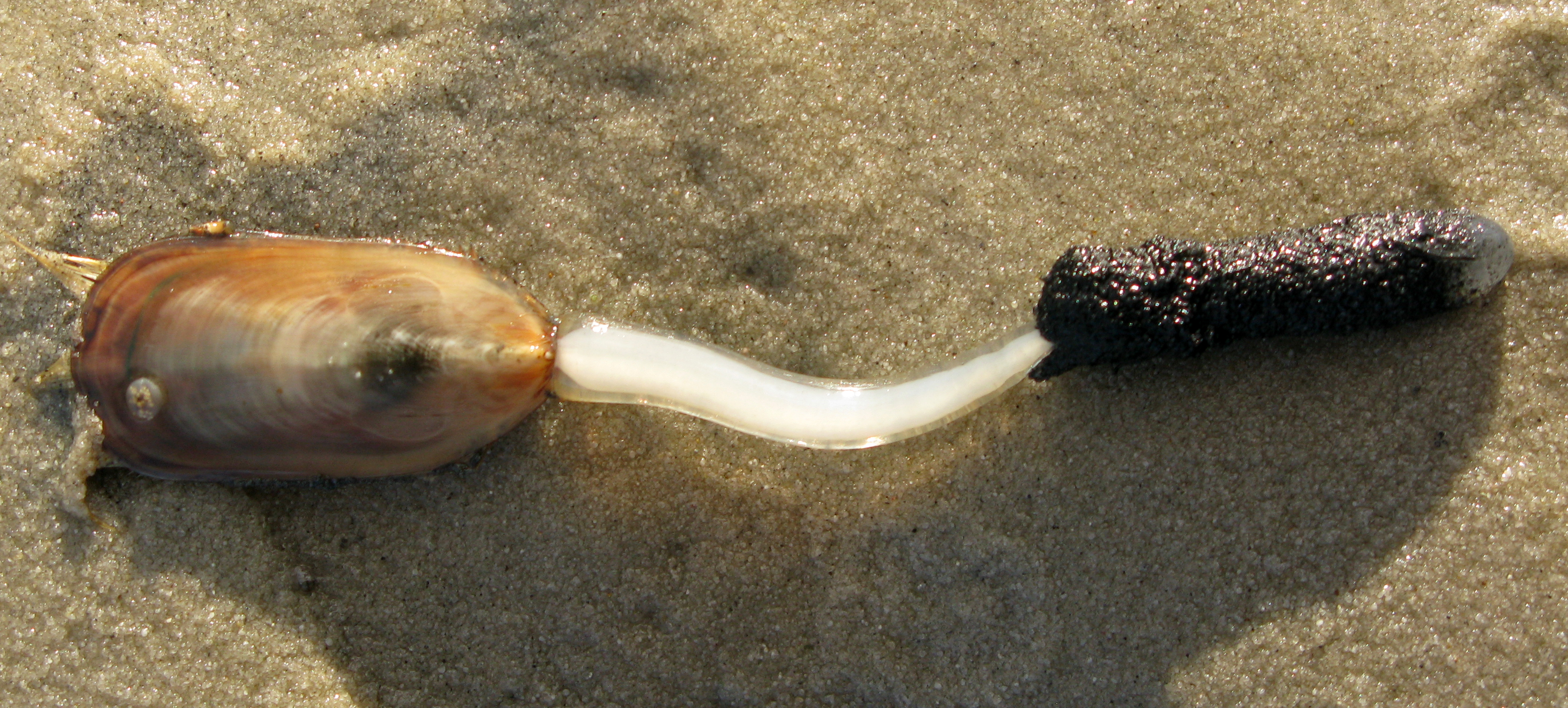
The brachiopod Lingula anatina was named Patella unguis in 1758.

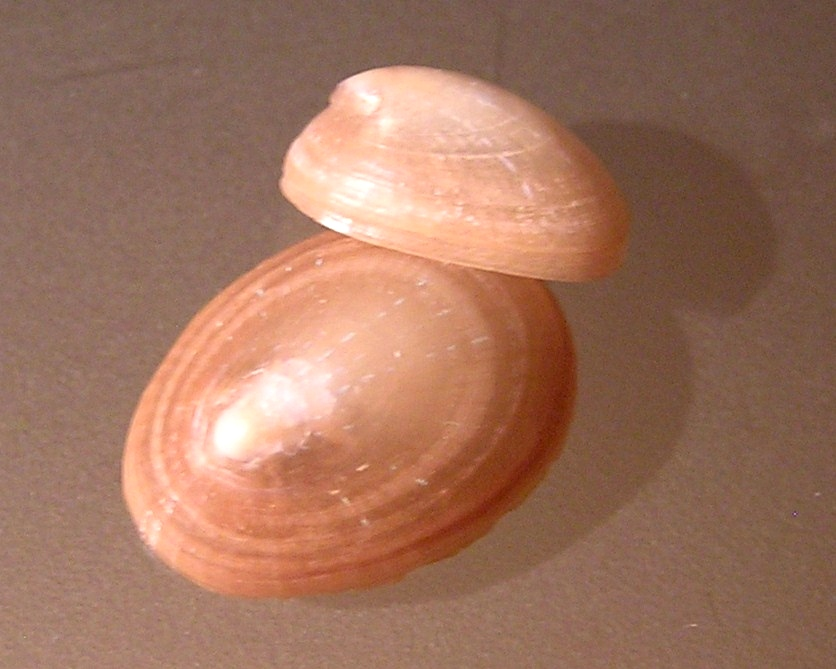
The blue-rayed limpet was named Patella pellucida in 1758.

Patella (true limpets & brachiopods)

- Patella equestris
- Patella neritoidea
- Patella chinensis
- Patella porcellana
- Patella fornicata
- Patella laciniosa – Siphonaria laciniosa
- Patella saccharina
- Patella barbara – Scutellastra barbara
- Patella granularis – Scutellastra granularis
- Patella granatina – Cymbula granatina
- Patella vulgata – common limpet
- Patella caerulea
- Patella tuberculata
- Patella ungarica
- Patella mammillaris
- Patella pectinata – striped false limpet
- Patella lutea
- Patella unguis – Lingula anatina
- Patella lacustris
- Patella pellucida – blue-rayed limpet
- Patella testudinaria – Cellana testudinaria
- Patella compressa – Cymbula compressa
- Patella rustica
- Patella fusca
- Patella notata – Clypidina notata
- Patella cruciata
- Patella reticulata
- Patella fissura – common slit limpet
- Patella pustula
- Patella graeca – Greek keyhole limpet
- Patella nimbosa
- Patella nubecula

Dentalium (tusk shells)

- Dentalium elephantinum
- Dentalium dentalis
- Dentalium entalis – Antalis entalis
- Dentalium minutum

Serpula (serpulid worms)

- Serpula seminulum
- Serpula planorbis
- Serpula spirillum
- Serpula spirorbis
- Serpula triquetra – Pomatoceros triqueter
- Serpula intricata
- Serpula contortuplicata
- Serpula glomerata – Petaloconchus glomeratus
- Serpula lumbricalis – Petaloconchus adansoni
- Serpula arenaria – Serpulorbis arenarius
- Serpula anguina – Tenagodus anguinus
- Serpula penis veneris
- Serpula penicillus
- Serpula ringens

== Lithophyta ==
Tubipora (organ pipe corals)

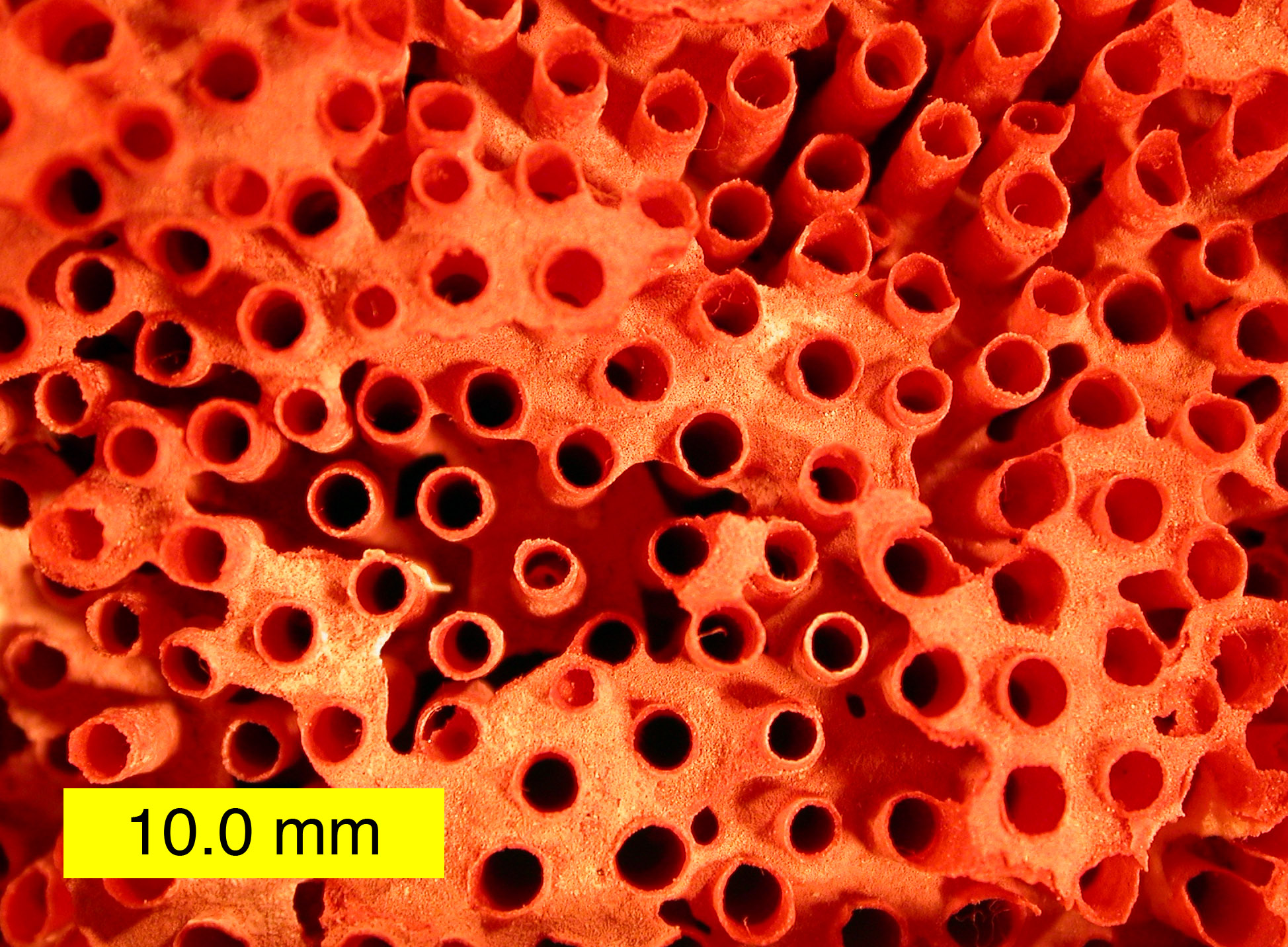
The organ pipe coral was named Tubipora musica in 1758.

- Tubipora musica – Organ pipe coral
- Tubipora infundibuliformis
- Tubipora verrucosa
- Tubipora urceus
- Tubipora serpens
- Tubipora repens
- Tubipora arenosa

Millepora (Fire corals)

- Millepora cellulosa
- Millepora lichenoides
- Millepora damicornis
- Millepora alcicornis
- Millepora reticulata
- Millepora lineata
- Millepora compressa
- Millepora muricata
- Millepora eschara
- Millepora crustacea

Madrepora (stone corals)

- Madrepora acetabulum – Acetabularia acetabulum
- Madrepora verrucaria
- Madrepora turbinata
- Madrepora fungites
- Madrepora pileus
- Madrepora maeandrites
- Madrepora labyrinthiformis
- Madrepora areolata
- Madrepora punctata
- Madrepora agaricites
- Madrepora truncata
- Madrepora stellaris
- Madrepora polygama
- Madrepora favosa
- Madrepora astroites
- Madrepora organum
- Madrepora flexuosa
- Madrepora turbinata
- Madrepora fascicularis
- Madrepora ananas
- Madrepora pertusa
- Madrepora ramea
- Madrepora rubra
- Madrepora oculata
- Madrepora virginea

== Zoophyta ==
Isis (soft corals)

- Isis hippuris
- Isis dichotoma
- Isis ocracea
- Isis anastatica
- Isis encrinus

Gorgonia (sea fans)

- Gorgonia spiralis
- Gorgonia ventalina – Common Sea Fan
- Gorgonia flabellum – Venus Sea Fan
- Gorgonia antipathes
- Gorgonia ceratophyta
- Gorgonia pinnata
- Gorgonia aenea
- Gorgonia placomus
- Gorgonia abies

Alcyonium (soft corals)

- Alcyonium arboreu
- Alcyonium digitatu
- Alcyonium bursa

Tubularia (Tubularia)

- Tubularia indivisa – Tall Tubularia
- Tubularia ramosa

Eschara (Bryozoa)

- Eschara foliacea
- Eschara fistulosa
- Eschara fragilis
- Eschara divaricata
- Eschara verticillata

Corallina (coralline algae)

- Corallina opuntia
- Corallina officinalis
- Corallina squamata
- Corallina corniculata
- Corallina barbata
- Corallina fragilissima
- Corallina rubens – Jania rubens
- Corallina cristata
- Corallina spermophoros
- Corallina penicillus

Sertularia (Bryozoa)

- Sertularia rosacea
- Sertularia pumila
- Sertularia operculata
- Sertularia tamarisca
- Sertularia abietina
- Sertularia cupressina
- Sertularia argentea
- Sertularia avicularia
- Sertularia rugosa
- Sertularia halecina
- Sertularia thuja
- Sertularia eburnea – Crisia eburnea
- Sertularia cornuta
- Sertularia myriophyllum
- Sertularia falcata
- Sertularia pluma
- Sertularia antennina
- Sertularia verticillata
- Sertularia volubilis
- Sertularia cuscuta
- Sertularia uva – Walkeria uva
- Sertularia lendigera
- Sertularia geniculata
- Sertularia dichotoma
- Sertularia spinosa
- Sertularia pinnata
- Sertularia polyzonias
- Sertularia setacea
- Sertularia stipulata
- Sertularia pennaria
- Sertularia lichenastrum
- Sertularia cedrina
- Sertularia purpurea
- Sertularia flexuosa
- Sertularia bursaria
- Sertularia loricata
- Sertularia fastigiata
- Sertularia neritina – Bugula neritina
- Sertularia scruposa
- Sertularia reptans
- Sertularia ciliata
- Sertularia chelata
- Sertularia anguina – Aetea anguina
- Sertularia polypina

Hydra

- Hydra polypus
- Hydra campanulata
- Hydra socialis
- Hydra stentoria
- Hydra pyraria
- Hydra convallaria
- Hydra crataegaria
- Hydra opercularia
- Hydra umbellaria
- Hydra berberina
- Hydra digitalis

Pennatula (sea pens)

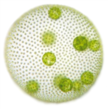
The chlorophyte Volvox was included among the animals in the 1758 Systema Naturae as two species: Volvox globator & Volvox chaos

- Pennatula phosphorea
- Pennatula filosa
- Pennatula sagitta
- Pennatula mirabilis

Taenia (tapeworms)

- Taenia solium – pork tapeworm
- Taenia vulgaris
- Taenia lata
- Taenia canina

Volvox

- Volvox globator
- Volvox chaos - Chaos chaos
