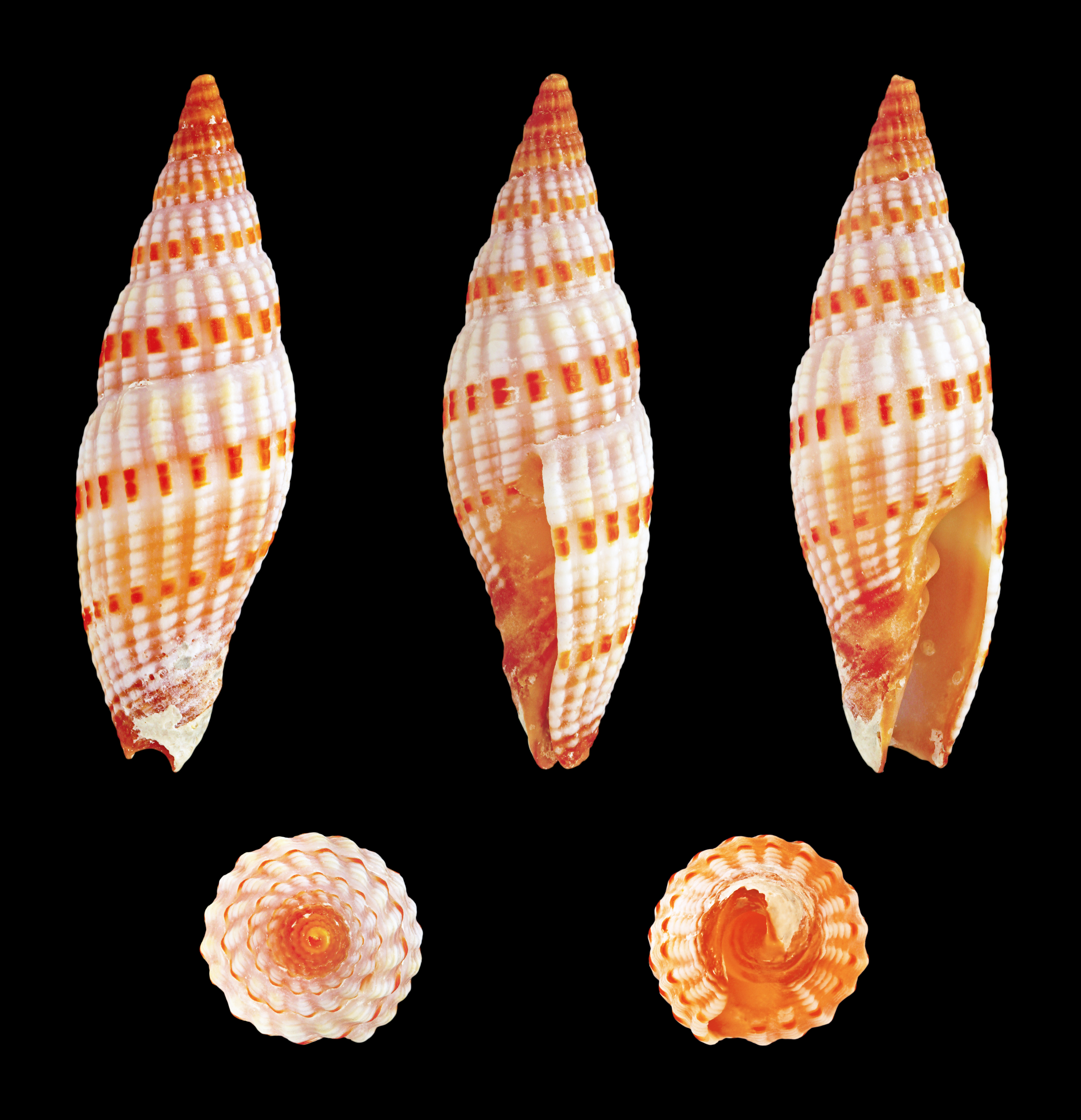

Scientific classification
- Kingdom: Animalia
- Phylum: Mollusca
- Class: Gastropoda
- Subclass: Caenogastropoda
- Order: Neogastropoda
- Superfamily: Turbinelloidea
- Family: Costellariidae
- Genus: Vexillum
- Species: V. sanguisuga

Binomial name
- Vexillum sanguisuga (Linnaeus, 1758)

Synonyms
- Mitra (Callithea) stigmataria Lamarck, 1811; Mitra (Callithea) stigmataria var. immaculata Tapparone Canefri, 1878; Mitra (Turricula) sanguisuga (Linnaeus, 1758); Mitra (Turricula) sanguisuga var. albida Dautzenberg & Bouge, 1923; Mitra (Turricula) sanguisuga var. caerulescens Dautzenberg & Bouge, 1923; Mitra (Turricula) sanguisuga var. transposita Dautzenberg & Bouge, 1923 ·; Mitra sanguisuga (Linnaeus, 1758); Mitra stigmataria Lamarck, 1811; Tiara (Callithea) stigmataria Swainson, 1840; Turricula sanguisuga (Linnaeus, 1758); Vexillum (Costellaria) sanguisuga (Linnaeus, 1758); Vexillum granosum (Gmelin, 1791) junior subjective synonym; Vexillum sanguisugum [sic] (misspelling); Voluta sanguisuga Linnaeus, 1758 (original combination)

= Vexillum sanguisuga =

Species of gastropod

Vexillum sanguisuga, common name the branded mitre, is a species of small sea snail, marine gastropod mollusk in the family Costellariidae, the ribbed miters.

== Description ==
The length of the shell attains 39 mm.

The shell is cylindrically fusiform with a high spire. It contains six whorls. It is transversely impressly striated, longitudinally ribbed, with the many ribs obtusely granulated. The outer lip is slightly concave. The aperture is narrow. It is edged with purple-brown. The shell is blueish white or yellowish, the ribs are blood-red, the base and apex are brownish black. The brown columella is four-plaited.

The shell is yellowish white to ash color, the ribs tipped with scarlet, sometimes with one or more chocolate bands, base and apex chocolate.

(Described as Vexillum granosum) The shell is yellowish white to ash color. The ribs are tipped with scarlet, sometimes with one or more chocolate bands. The base and apex have a chocolate color.

== Distribution ==
This marine species occurs in the Indo-West Pacific: off the Philippines, Thailand, Vietnam, Indonesia, the Solomon Islands; also off Papua New Guinea and Australia (Queensland, Western Australia).
