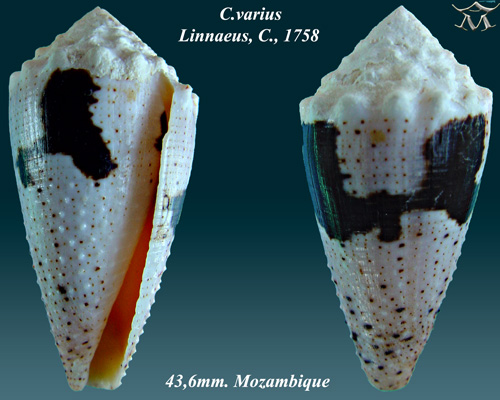
- Apertural and abapertural views of shell of Conus varius Linnaeus, C., 1758
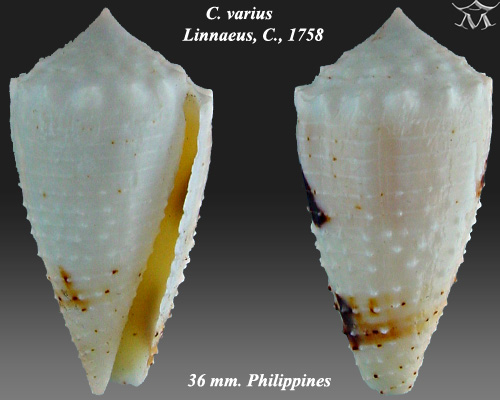

Conservation status
- Least Concern (IUCN 3.1)

Scientific classification
- Kingdom: Animalia
- Phylum: Mollusca
- Class: Gastropoda
- Subclass: Caenogastropoda
- Order: Neogastropoda
- Superfamily: Conoidea
- Family: Conidae
- Genus: Conus
- Species: C. varius

Binomial name
- Conus varius Linnaeus, 1758

Synonyms
- Conus (Strategoconus) varius Linnaeus, 1758 · accepted, alternate representation; Conus hevassii A. Adams, 1855; Conus pulchellus G. B. Sowerby I, 1834 (invalid: junior homonym of Conus pulchellus Swainson, 1822); Cucullus annularis Röding, 1798; Cucullus granulosus Röding, 1798; Cucullus radula Röding, 1798; Rolaniconus varius (Linnaeus, 1758); Stephanoconus varius Habe, T. 1964

= Conus varius =

Species of sea snail

Conus varius, common name the freckled cone, is a species of sea snail, a marine gastropod mollusk in the family Conidae, the cone snails and their allies.

Like all species within the genus Conus, these snails are predatory and venomous. They are capable of stinging humans, therefore live ones should be handled carefully or not at all.

== Description ==
The size of the shell varies between 30 mm and 61 mm. The color of the shell is white, marbled with orange, rose, chestnut or chocolate, with sometimes revolving lines of spots. The spire contains rather small tubercles. The basal half of the body whorl shows revolving grooves. The upper half of the body whorl shows revolving rows of tubercles, which become more distinct towards the spire.

== Distribution ==
This species occurs in the Indian Ocean off East Africa, the Mascarene Islands and Aldabra; off Fiji and Australia (Northern Territory, Queensland).
