= Christoph Gottlieb von Murr =

German scholar (1733–1811)

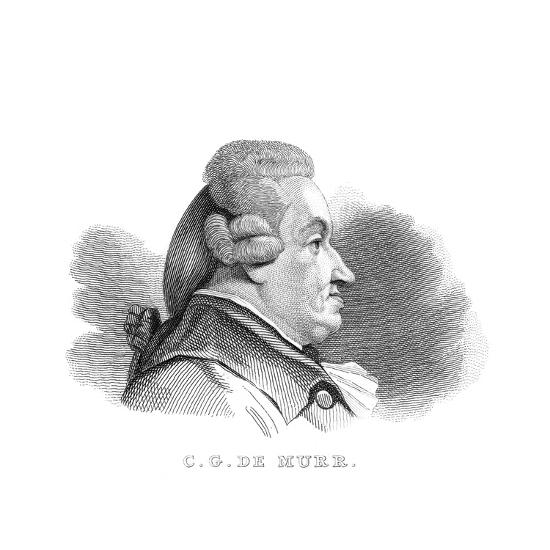
Portrait of Christoph Gottlieb von Murr in 1791

Christoph Gottlieb von Murr (6 August 1733 – 8 April 1811) was a polymathic German scholar, based in Nuremberg. He was a historian and magistrate. He edited and contributed to significant cultural and scientific journals. A notable naturalist von Murr was a Member of the Gesellschaft Naturforschender Freunde zu Berlin (Berlin Society of Friends of Natural Science) and the Bayerische Akademie der Wissenschaften (Bavarian Academy of Sciences). He was also an art historian, the author of the first bibliography of books on painting, sculpture, and engraving. He published extensively on illuminated manuscripts, early printed books, the history of libraries, the history of the Jesuit missions, the history of the Jews in China, Arabic and Chinese literature. Familiar with most of the European languages, he was an active correspondent with many of the most distinguished scholars of the period. He had a vast library.

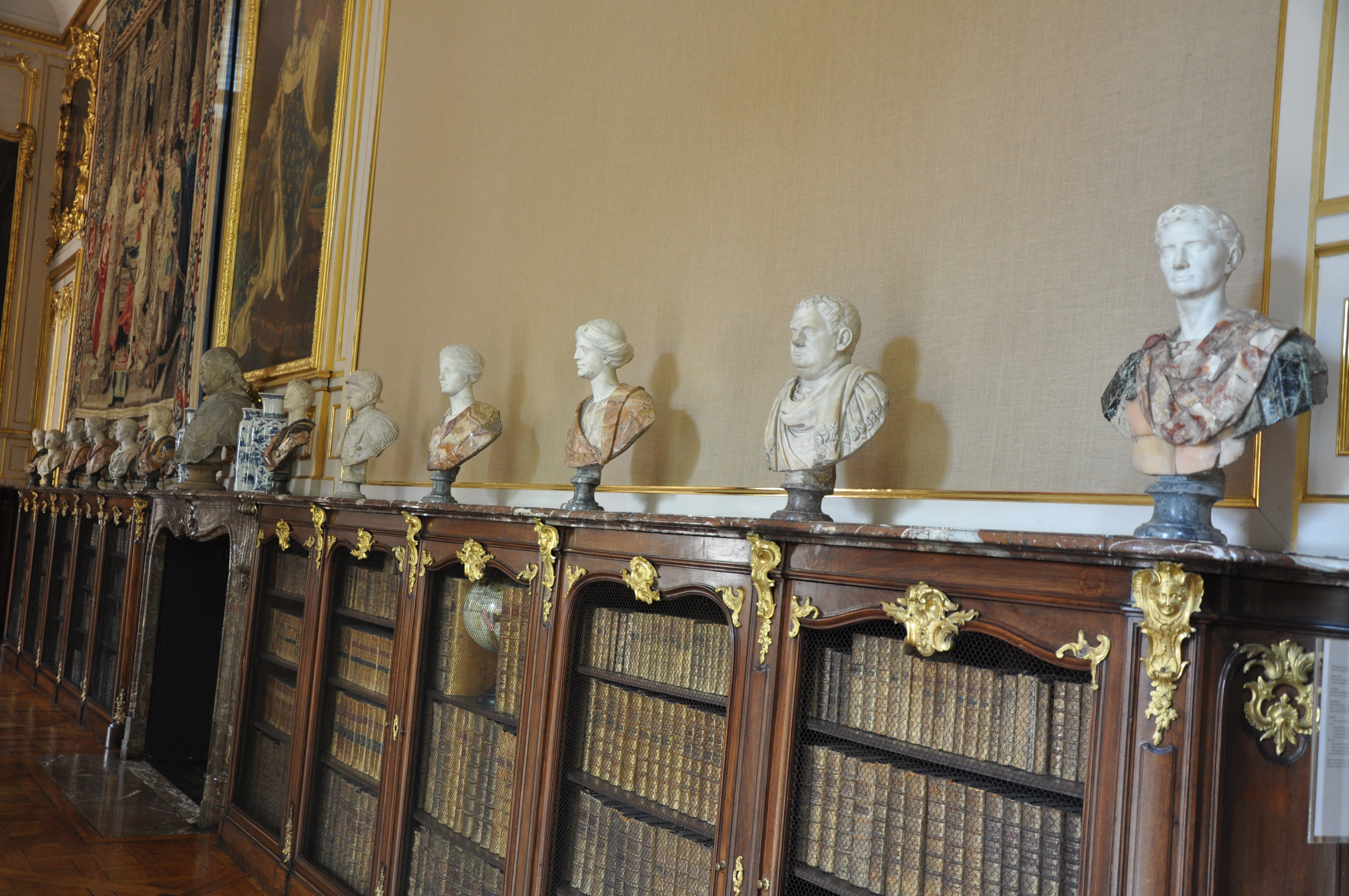
18th century library in Strasbourg

== Life ==
Christoph Gottlieb von Murr studied at the University of Altdorf and received his doctorate in law in 1754. In addition to law, Murr was interested in natural history, philosophy, mathematics, archaeology and history. After completing his doctorate, he first devoted himself to a history of the Hohenstaufen emperors, especially Friedrich II. On his study trips made from 1756–61 through the Netherlands, England, Austria and Italy, he established relationships with numerous scholars with whom he was in active correspondence throughout his life, and he acquired an extensive collection of art and autographs. After returning from his trips, Murr became a customs and toll official in Nuremberg. In addition, he published numerous literary, art and general historical works, especially on the history of art, craft and culture in Nuremberg. He was also the editor of the Journals zur Kunstgeschichte und zur allgemeinen Literatur (transl. Journal of Art History and General Literature) and des Neuen Journals zur Litteratur) and des Neuen Journals zur Litteratur und Kunstgeschichtethe (transl. New Journal of Literature and Art History). Friedrich Schiller used Murr's monograph (based on archives in Vienna) on the history of the Thirty Years War as a basis when he wrote Wallenstein. Von Murr was a regular contributor to Der Naturforscher (transl. "The Naturalist") as C. G. von M.

== Defence of The Jesuit order ==
During a stay in Strasbourg, the Protestant Murr also came into contact with the Jesuit order and became a journalist writing about Jesuit issues and the suppression of 1773. He was one of the few German Protestants during the Enlightenment to defend the order and the Jesuit China mission. Von Murr reproduced in 1790 the book published in 1553 by Michael Servetus entitled Christianismi restitutio. The original books were burned when Servetus himself was burned at the stake in Geneva. Von Murr used as model the exemplar in the National Library in Vienna, one of the three surviving exemplars.

== Selected works ==
- Anmerkungen über Herrn Lessings Laokoon. 1769.
- Bibliothèque de peinture, de sculpture et de gravure. 1770.
- Briefe eines Protestanten über die Aufhebung des Jesuitenordens. 1773/74.
- Beschreibung der vornehmsten Merkwürdigkeiten in der Reichsstadt Nürnberg, in deren Bezirke und auf der Universität Altdorf. 1778/1802.
- Premier voyage autour du monde par le chevr. Pigafetta : sur l'escadre de Magellan, pendant les annees 1519, 20, 21 et 22 : suivi de l'extrait du Traite de Navigation du meme auteur : et d'une notice sur le chevalier Martin Behaim, avec la description de son globe terrestre Jansen, l'an IX, [1801]

== Works on Natural History ==
- Murr, C. G. von 1759: Abhandlung von Naturalienkabinetten etc. Hannoverisches Magazin, Hannover (St. 15; 22; 42; 43) 225-240; 337-352; 657-672; 673-680
- Murr, C. G. von 1761: Abhandlung von Naturalienkabinetten etc. Stuttg. oekon.-physik. Auszüge, Stuttgart - 3 73-87
- Murr, C. G. von 1772: Abhandlung von Naturalienkabinetten etc. Leipzig, Krause
- [Murr, C. G. von ] 1774: Herrn Peter Collinsons gesammelte Nachrichten von den Graspferden in Nordamerica. Der Naturforscher, Halle/Saale - 2 197-201
- [Murr, C. G. von ]1774: Samuel Feltons, Esq. Nachricht von einer sonderbaren noch nie beschriebenen Gattung einer Wespe und eines Graspferdes (Cicada) in Jamaica. Der Naturforscher, Halle/Saale - 2 194-196
- Murr, C. G. von 1775: Beytraege zur Naturgeschichte von Japon und Sina. Nebst drey Tafeln chinesischer Figuren.Der Naturforscher, Halle/Saale - 7 1-51, Taf.

== Correspondents ==
- Leonard Euler
- Carl Linnaeus
- Sigmund von Haimhausen
- Friedrich Wilhelm Joseph Schelling
- Axel Fredrik Cronstedt
- Friedrich Heinrich Wilhelm Martini
- Johann Gottlieb Gleditsch
- Martin Heinrich Klaproth
- Dietrich Ludwig Gustav Karsten
- Adelbert von Chamisso
- Alexander von Humboldt
- Otto Friedrich Müller
- Johann Hieronymus Chemnitz

== Bibliography ==
Peter Wolf, « Protestantischer ‘Jesuitismus’ im Zeitalter der Aufklärung : Christoph Gottlieb Murr (1733–1811) und die Jesuiten », Zeitschrift für bayerische Landesgeschichte, LXII, 1999, p. 99-137.
