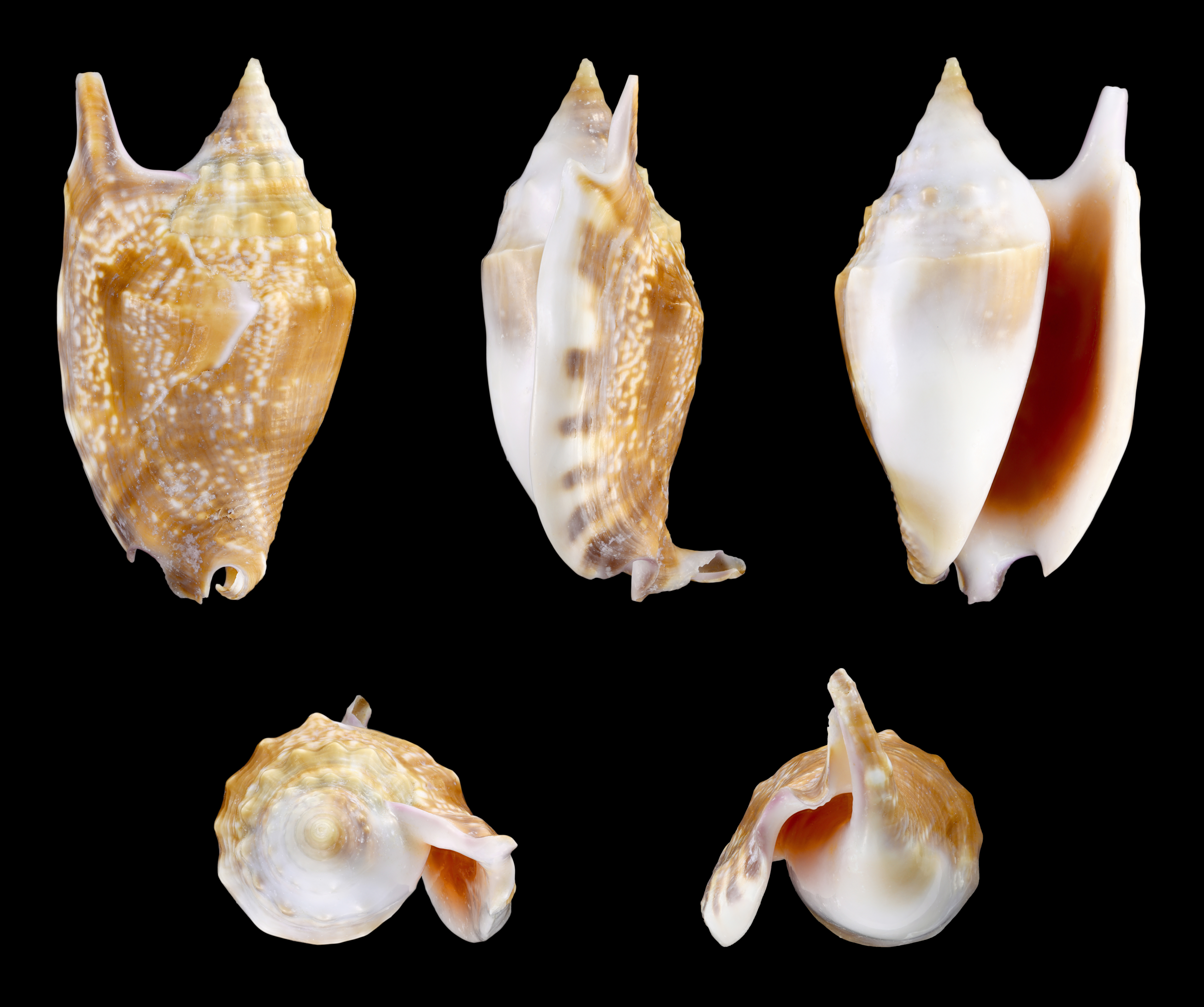
- Euprotomus bulla

Scientific classification
- Kingdom: Animalia
- Phylum: Mollusca
- Class: Gastropoda
- Subclass: Caenogastropoda
- Order: Littorinimorpha
- Family: Strombidae
- Genus: Euprotomus
- Species: E. bulla

Binomial name
- Euprotomus bulla (Röding, 1798)

Synonyms
- Lambis bulla Röding, 1798 (basionym); Strombus bulla (Röding, 1798); Strombus laevis Perry, 1811; Strombus guttatus "Martini", Reeve, 1843

= Euprotomus bulla =

Species of gastropod

Euprotomus bulla, common name : the Bubble Conch, is a species of sea snail, a marine gastropod mollusk in the family Strombidae, the true conchs.

== Description ==
The shell size varies between 48 mm and 90 mm. The shell of the snail is almost elliptical, with a rough dorsal surface, and tubercles on its shoulders. Outside, the shell is a "glossy cream" color, with fawn mottlings and spiral bands of gray appearing in mature specimens. The inside of the shell is aperture bright pink or orange.

== Distribution ==
This species is distributed in the Pacific Ocean along Indonesia, the Ryukyus (Japan) and Samoa.

== Habitat ==
Known from depths around 500 feet, via tangle nets.
