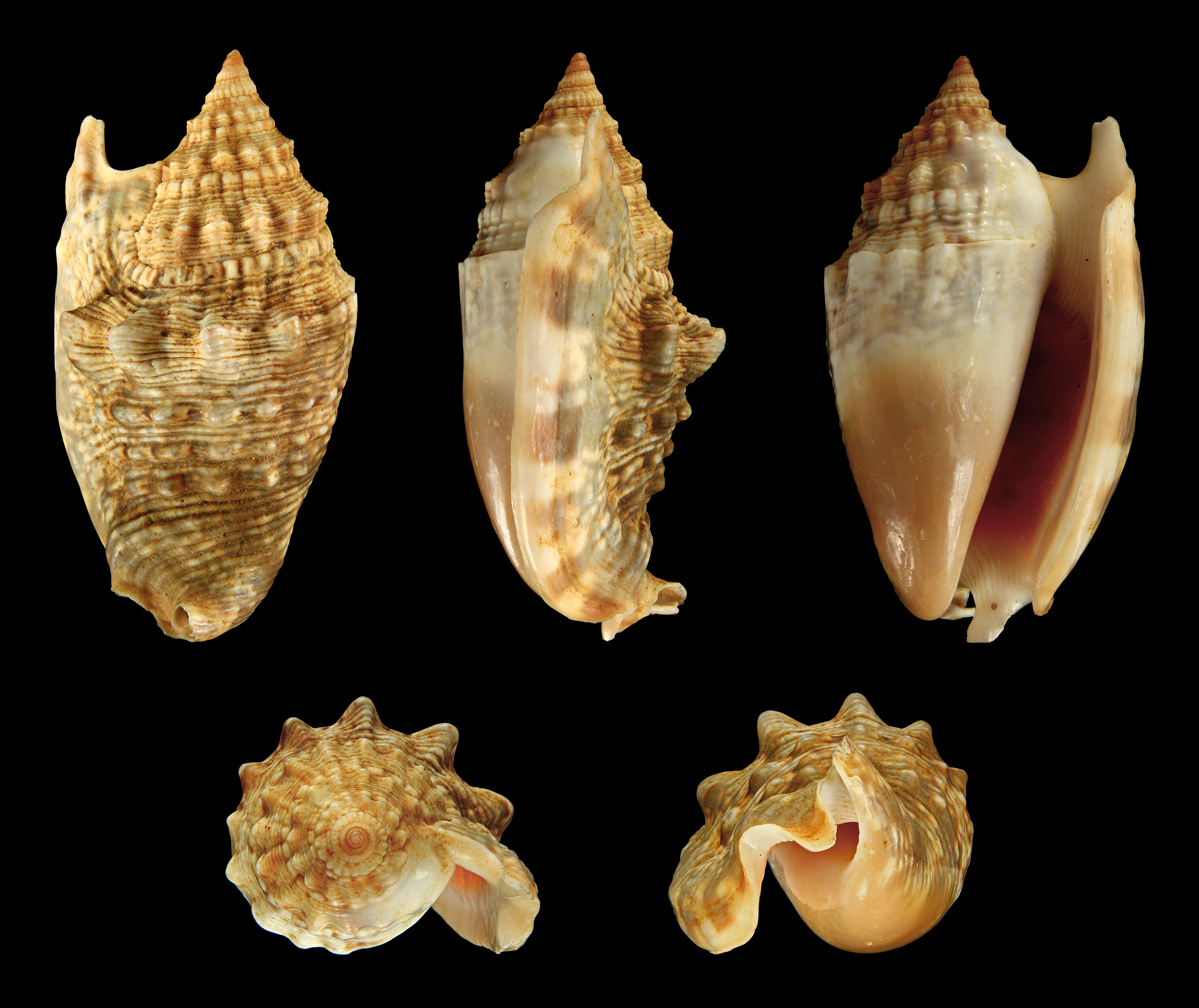
- Five views of a shell of Euprotomus aurisdianae

Scientific classification
- Kingdom: Animalia
- Phylum: Mollusca
- Class: Gastropoda
- Subclass: Caenogastropoda
- Order: Littorinimorpha
- Family: Strombidae
- Genus: Euprotomus
- Species: E. aurisdianae

Binomial name
- Euprotomus aurisdianae (Linnaeus, 1758)

Synonyms
- Strombus aurisdianae Linnaeus, 1767; Strombus aratrum (Röding, 1798); Strombus buris Röding, 1798; Strombus chrysostomus Kuroda, 1942; Strombus lamarckii Gray, 1842; Strombus stiva Röding, 1798; Strombus striatogranosus Martens in Möbius, 1880

= Euprotomus aurisdianae =

Species of gastropod

Euprotomus aurisdianae, common name the Diana conch, is a species of small to medium-sized sea snail, a marine gastropod mollusk in the family Strombidae, the true conchs.

== Shell description ==
The maximum shell length of this species is up to 90 mm, but it more commonly grows to 70 mm in size.

Euprotomus aurisdianae has a thick and solid shell which has a nearly elliptical contour. The shell has a high pointed spire and an irregular body whorl, ornamented with large knobs and easily distinguishable and divergent ridges. The flaring outer lip has a characteristic posterior expansion, with an aspect similar to that of a spine, that extends itself posteriorly as far as half the length of the apex. Liration is present near the anterior and posterior ends of the outer lip. The inner lip is smooth with a thin callus. The siphonal canal is strongly bent, and the stromboid notch is deep, easily distinguishable.

The shell color can vary from dull cream to pale grey, with irregular darker spots and lines. The ventral callus and inner lip are commonly glossy white. The aperture is rich orange or pink interiorly, and becomes paler towards the outer lip margin.

== Distribution ==
This species occurs in the West Pacific, from Japan in the north to northern Queensland, Australia in the south. The species Euprotomus aurora, long confused with E. aurisdianae, replaces this species in the Indian Ocean.

== Ecology ==
=== Habitat ===
Euprotomus aurisdianae is known to live in intertidal and shallow subtidal zones. It dwells in shallow water coral reef areas, such as coral sand, grassy sand flats and dead coral, to a maximum depth of around 10 m.

=== Feeding ===
This species is known to be a herbivore.

== Human uses ==
This sea snail is generally collected for food wherever it is abundant. The shell of Euprotomus aurisdianae is commonly used in shellcraft, and is sold in local markets in the central and northern Philippines.
