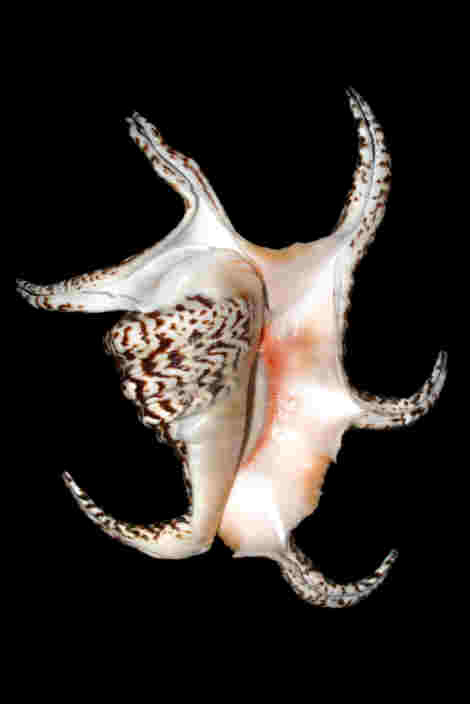
- Harpago chiragra

Scientific classification
- Kingdom: Animalia
- Phylum: Mollusca
- Class: Gastropoda
- Subclass: Caenogastropoda
- Order: Littorinimorpha
- Family: Strombidae
- Genus: Harpago
- Species: H. chiragra

Binomial name
- Harpago chiragra (Linnaeus, 1758)

Synonyms
- Lambis chiragra (Linnaeus, 1758); Lambis harpago Röding, 1798; Lambis kochii Freyer, 1855; Lambris rugosa (Sowerby II, 1842); Lambis undulata Röding, 1798; Pterocera kochii Freyer, 1855; Bothrodon pridii Kerr, 1927; Strombus chiragra Linnaeus, 1758 (basionym)

= Harpago chiragra =

Species of gastropod

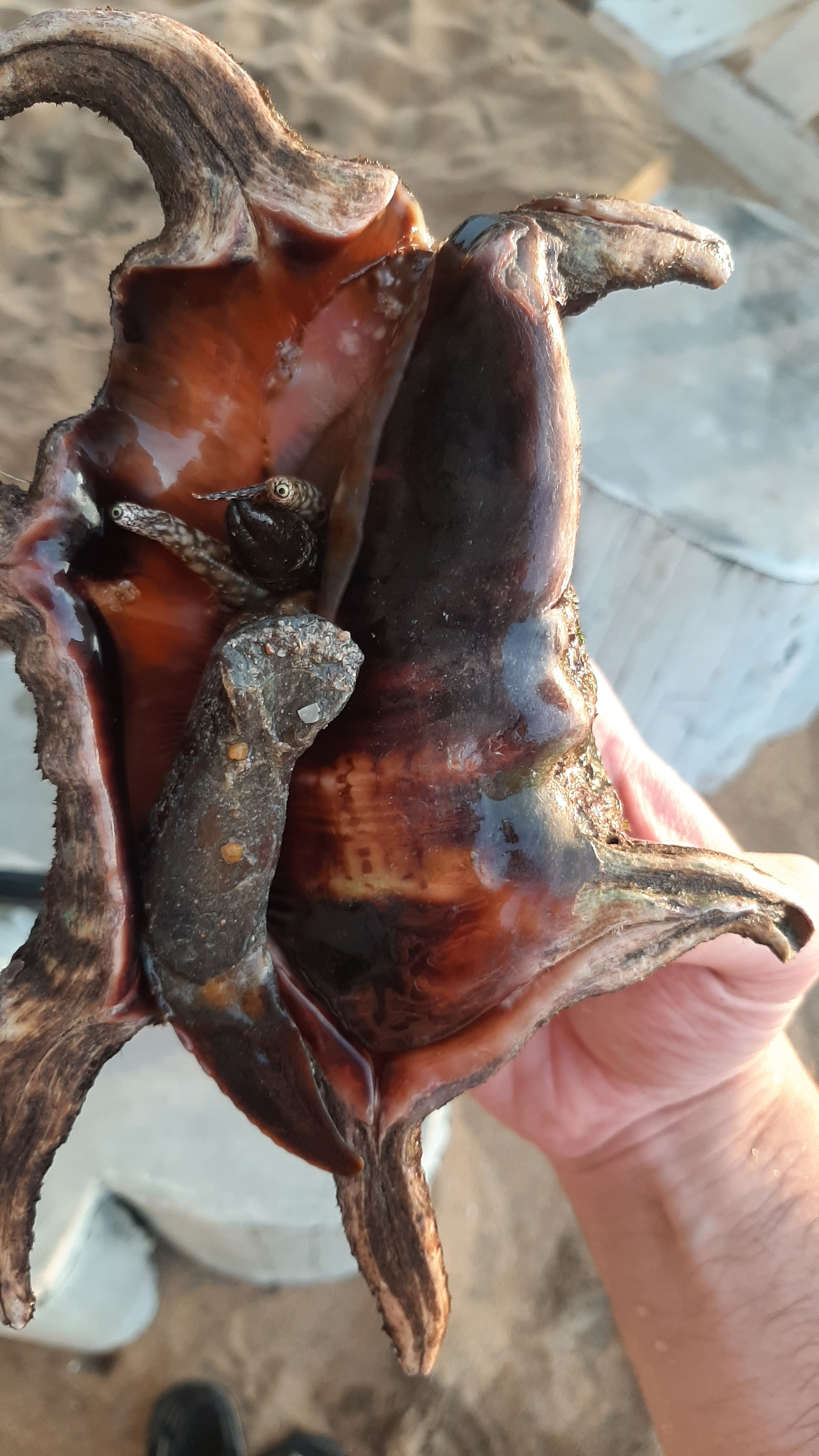
Open mollusk

Harpago chiragra, common name the Chiragra spider conch, is a species of very large sea snail, a marine gastropod mollusk in the family Strombidae, the true conchs.

== Shell description ==
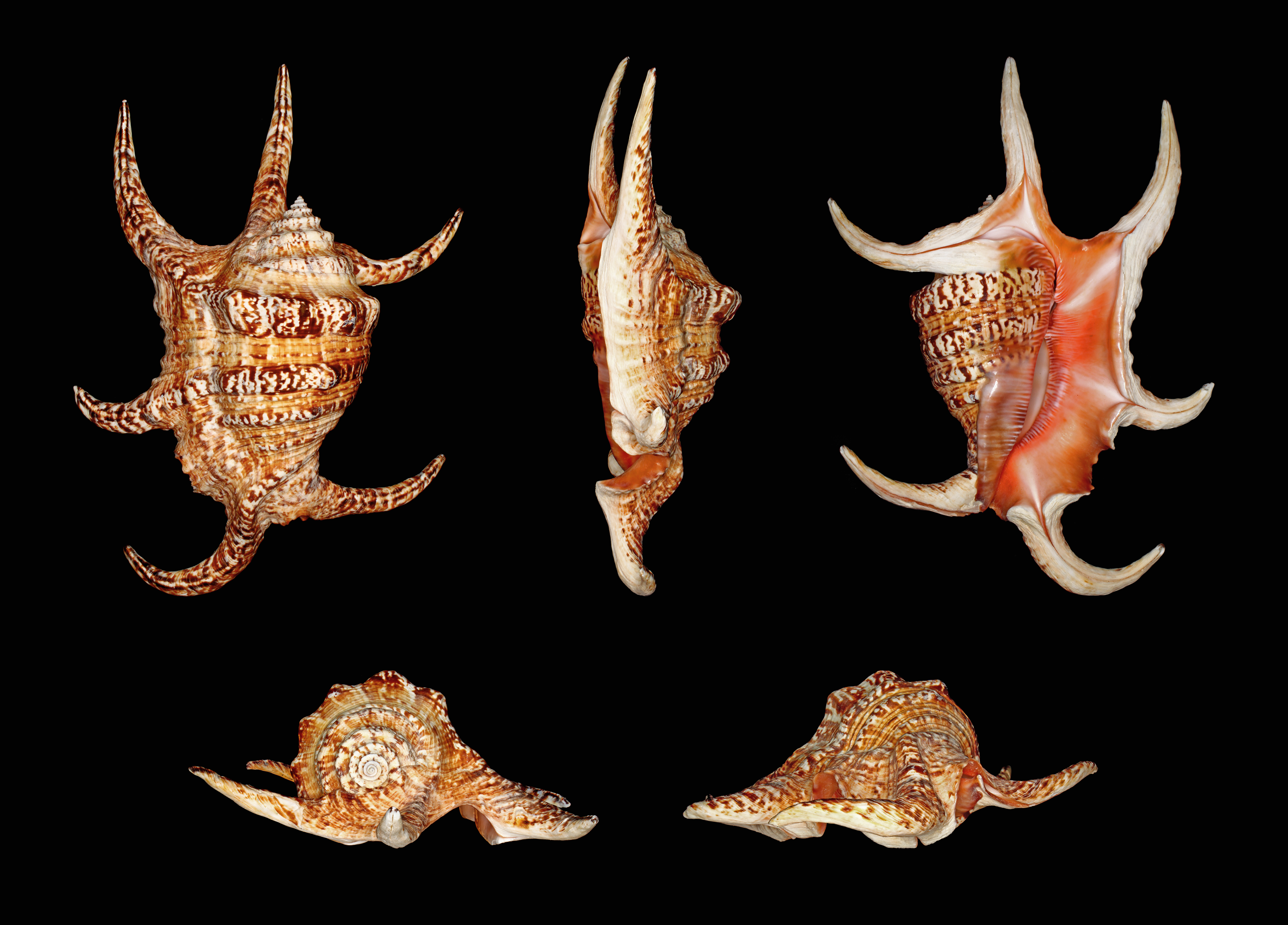

The shell length for this species varies between 85 mm and 320 mm, usually to 170 mm. Harpago chiragra has a very thick, robust and heavy shell, with a distinct anterior notch. Its most prominent characteristic are the six long and curved marginal digitations, expanded from the flaring, thick outer lip and canals. The columella and aperture are lirate.

== Anatomy ==
Sexual dimorphism is strongly present in this species. Female individuals are usually much larger than the male ones.

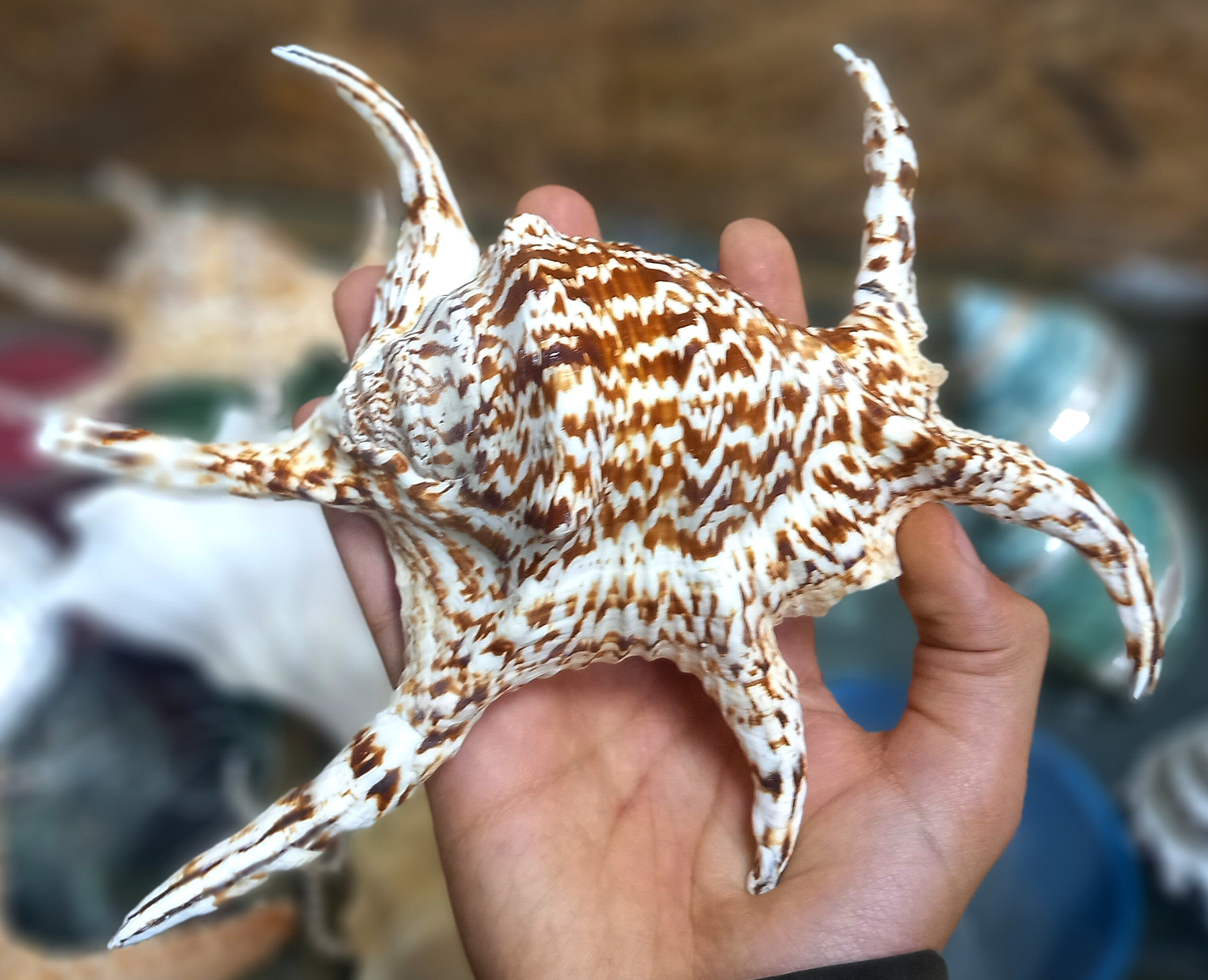
Harpago chiragra

== Distribution ==
Harpago chiragra is widely distributed in the Indo-Pacific, ranging from the Aldabra Atoll, Chagos, Mauritius, Mozambique, Sri Lanka and the Gulf of Bengal to eastern Polynesia. It ranges north as far as Taiwan and southern Japan, and south to New Caledonia and Australia.

== Ecology ==
=== Habitat ===
Harpago chiragra lives in coral reef areas. It can be found in littoral and sublittoral zones, in tidal pools and low tide levels to a depth of around 25 m.

=== Feeding habits ===
Harpago chiragra is known to be an herbivore, feeding on plants and algae.

== Human uses ==
The flesh of H. chiragra is edible, and it is locally collected for food. The shell is used in shellcraft.
