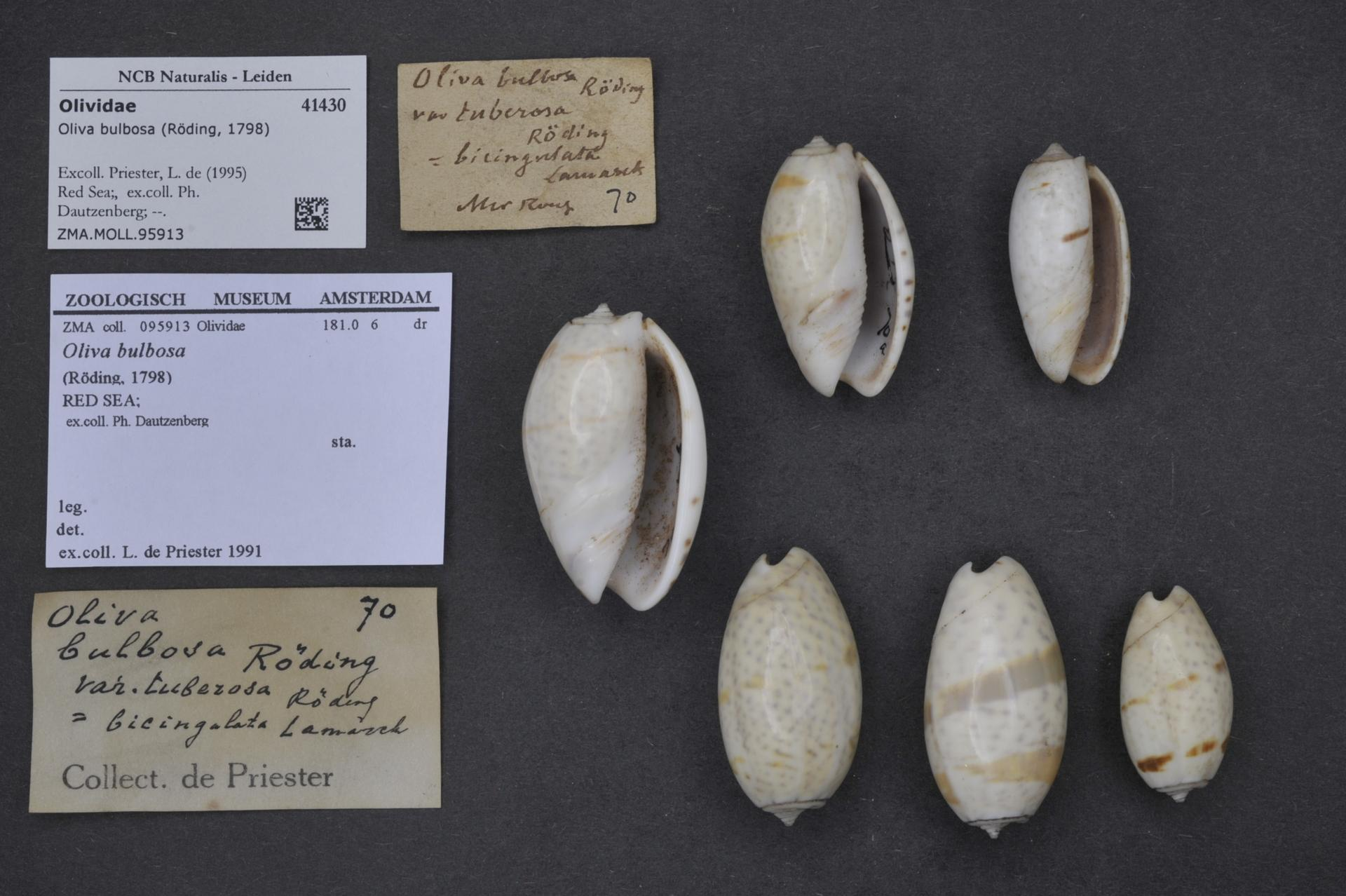

Scientific classification
- Kingdom: Animalia
- Phylum: Mollusca
- Class: Gastropoda
- Subclass: Caenogastropoda
- Order: Neogastropoda
- Family: Olividae
- Genus: Oliva
- Species: O. bulbosa

Binomial name
- Oliva bulbosa (Röding, 1798)

Synonyms
- Oliva fabagina Lamarck, 1810; Oliva gebbosa Deshayes; Oliva inflata Lamarck, 1811; Oliva inflata fabagina Lamarck, 1810; Oliva inflata inflata Lamarck, 1811; Oliva inflata tuberosa (Röding, 1798); Porphyria bulbosa Röding, 1798; Porphyria tuberosa Röding, 1798

= Oliva bulbosa =

Species of gastropod

Oliva bulbosa, common name the swollen olive, is a species of sea snail, a marine gastropod mollusk in the family Olividae, the olives.

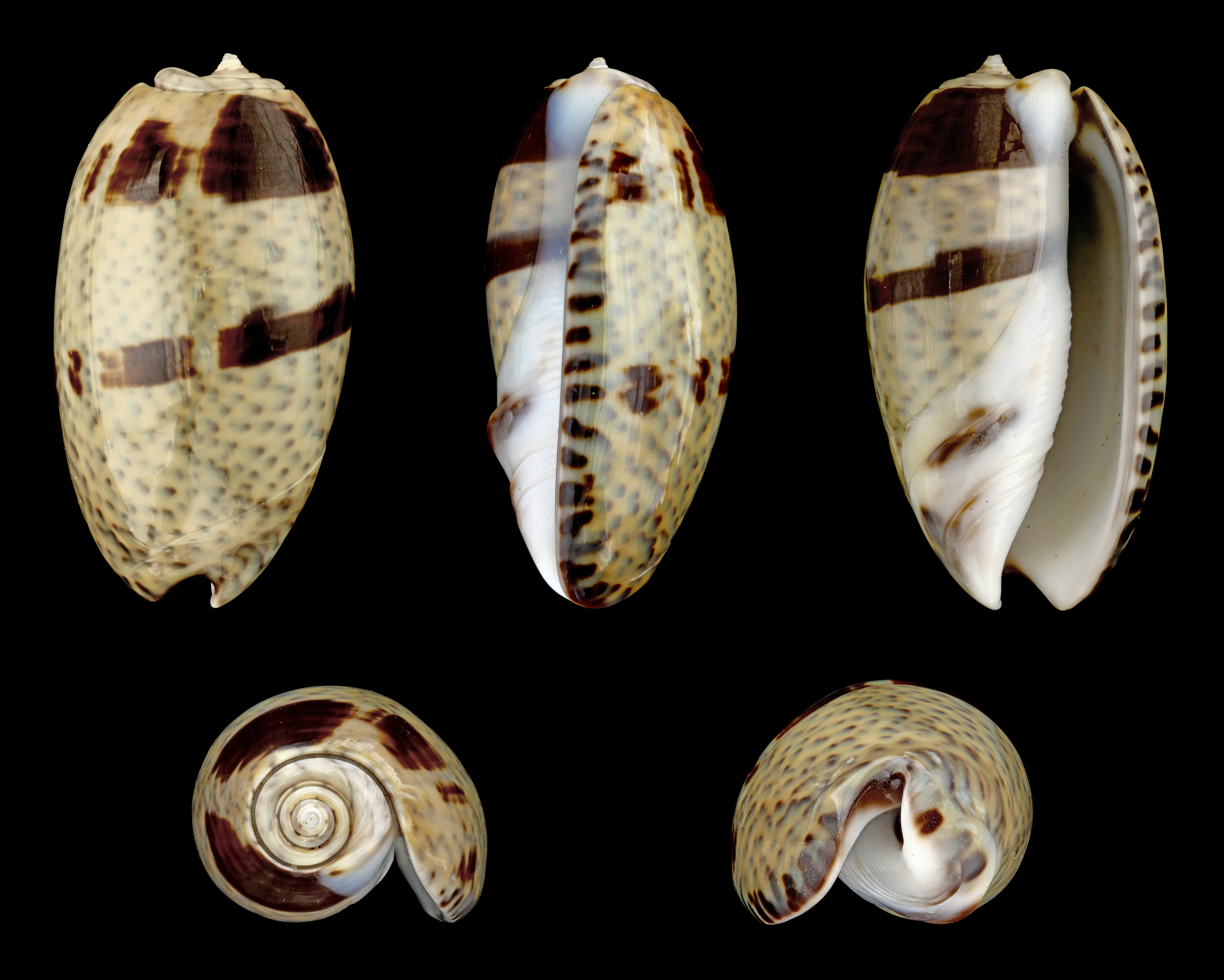
forma bicingulata

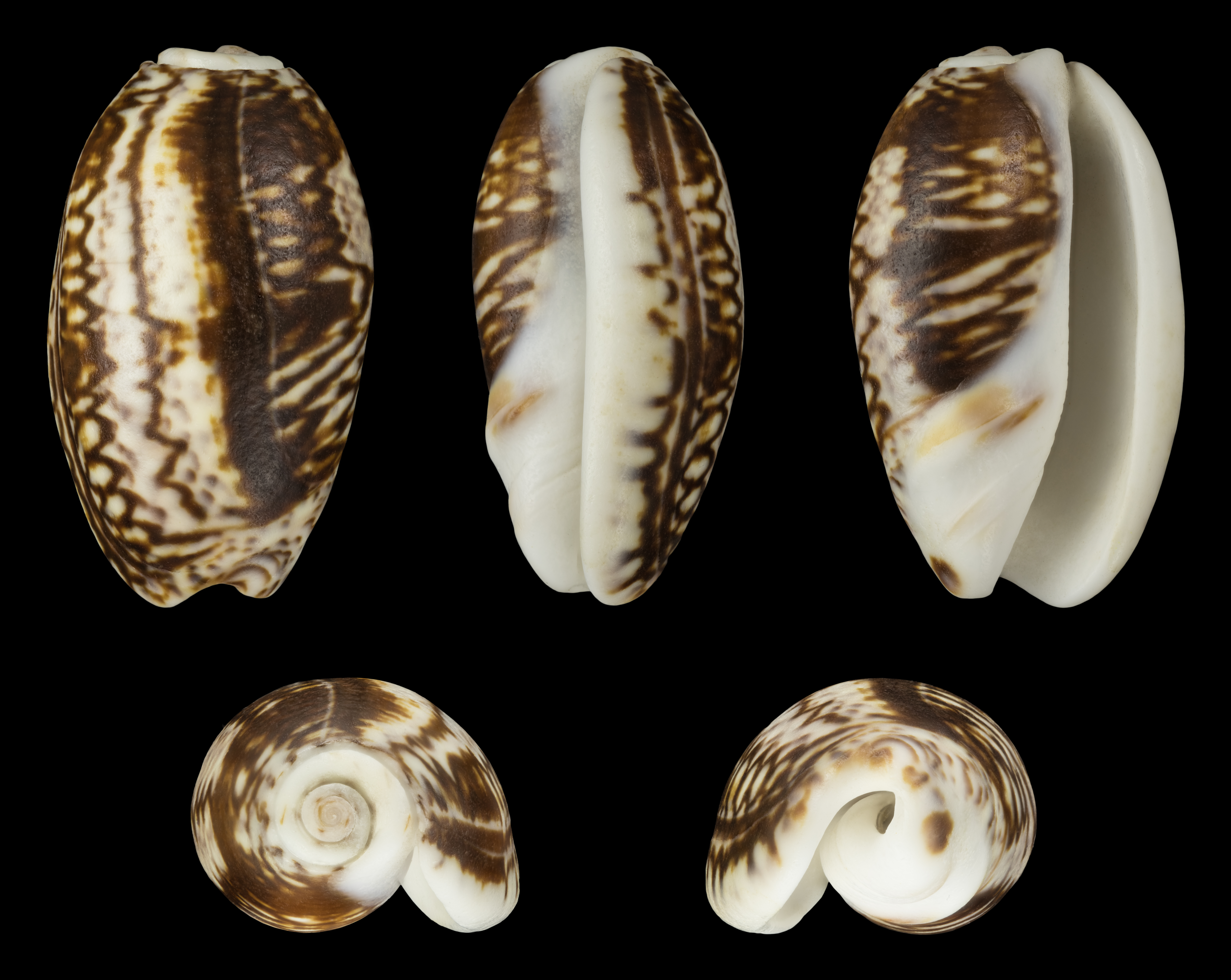
forma fabagina

== Description ==
Shell size 30-35 mm.

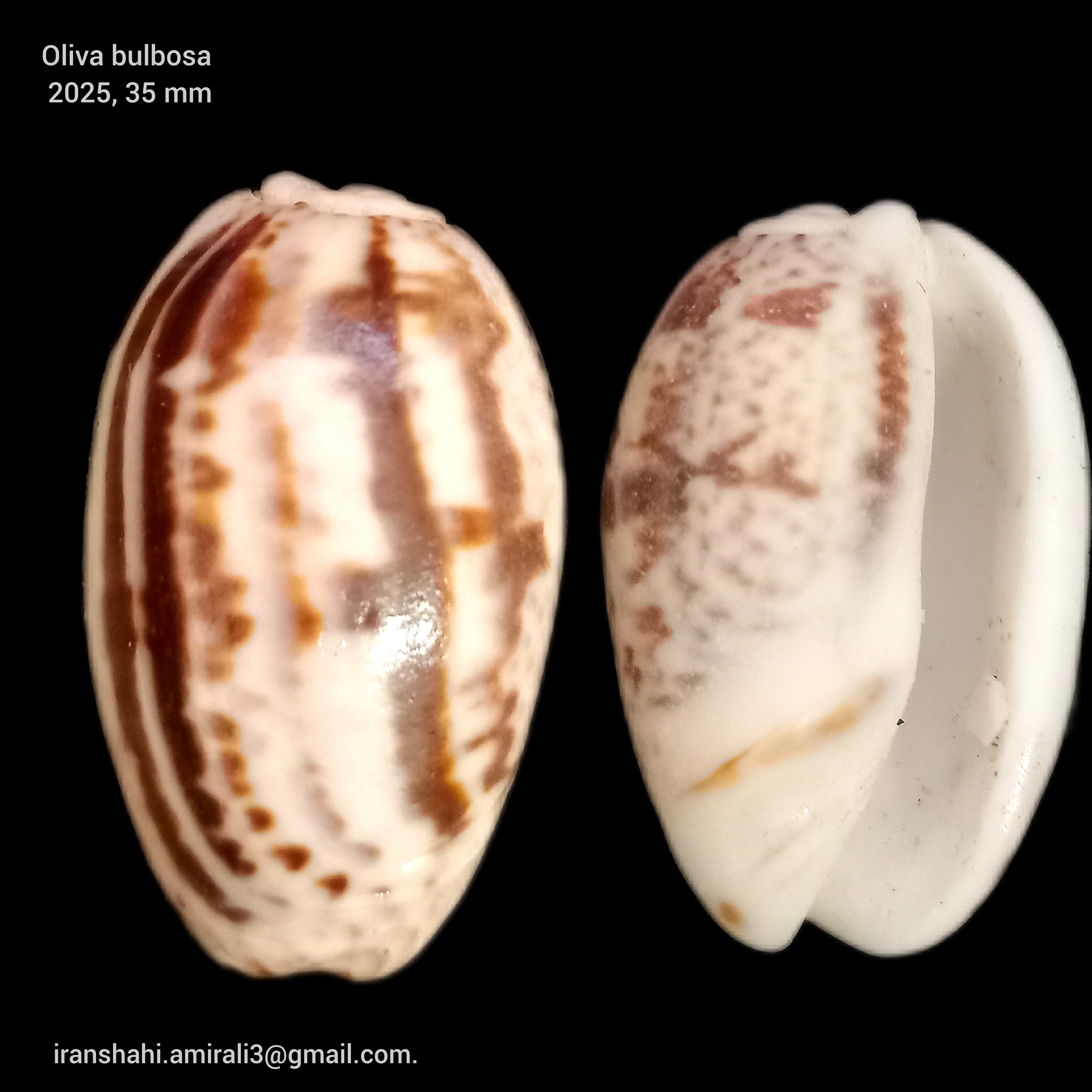
Oliva bulbosa

== Distribution ==
Indian Ocean.
