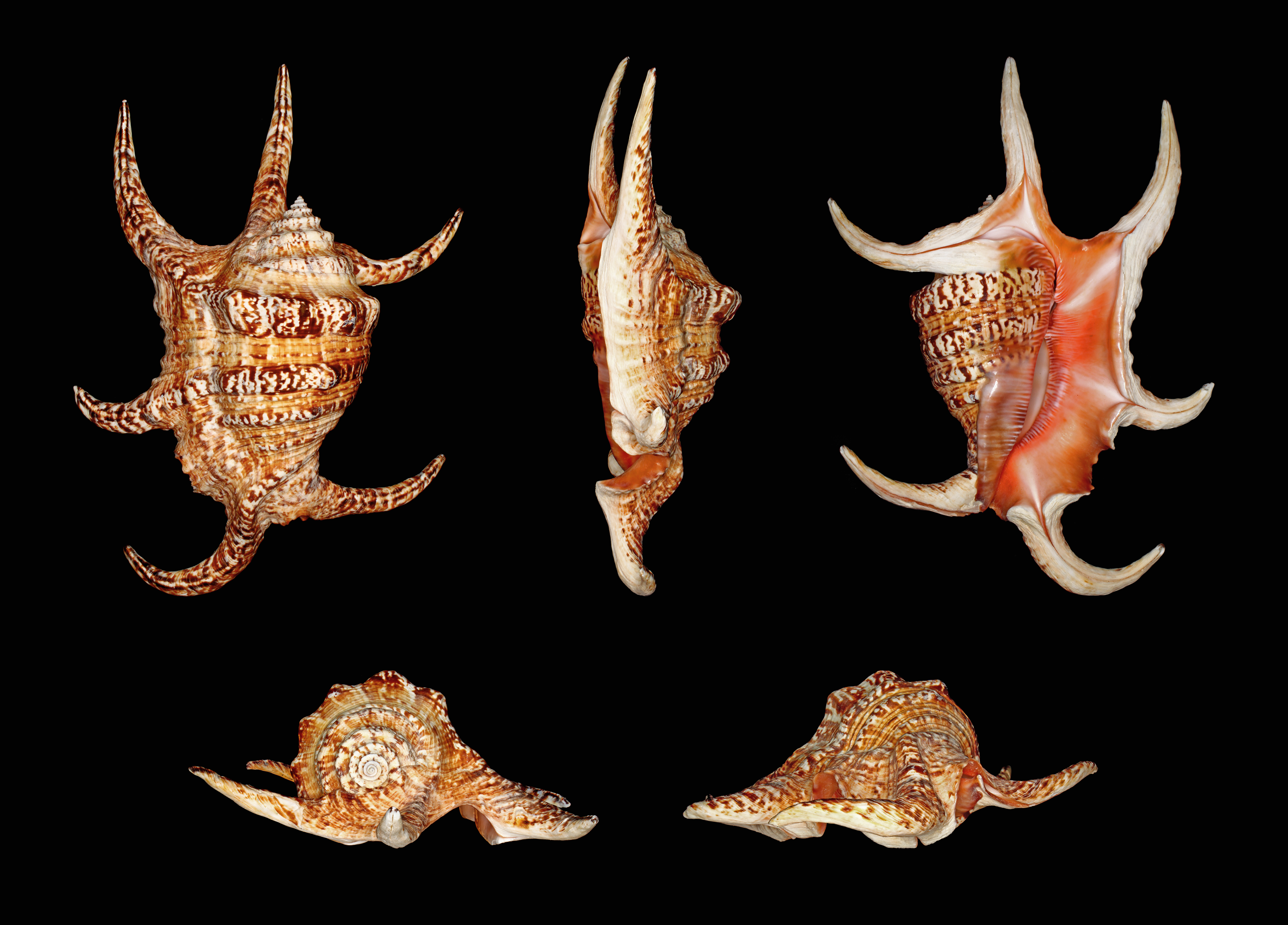
- Five views of a shell of Harpago chiragra

Scientific classification
- Kingdom: Animalia
- Phylum: Mollusca
- Class: Gastropoda
- Subclass: Caenogastropoda
- Order: Littorinimorpha
- Family: Strombidae
- Genus: Harpago; Mörch, 1852

Type species
- Lambis harpago Röding, 1798

= Harpago =

Harpago Temporal range: Quaternary–Recent

Genus of gastropods

Harpago is a genus of sea snails, marine gastropod mollusks in the family Strombidae, the true conchs.

Harpago ('grappling iron') is also a term used in insect morphology for the distal end of a genital clasper.

== Species ==
Species within the genus Harpago include:

Image	Scientific name	Distribution
	Harpago arthriticus (Röding, 1798)	Indian Ocean along the Aldabra Atoll, Kenya, Madagascar, the Maldives, the Mascarene Basin, Mauritius, Mozambique, Réunion, the Seychelles and Tanzania
	Harpago chiragra (Linnaeus, 1758)	Indo-Pacific, ranging from the Aldabra Atoll, Chagos, Mauritius, Mozambique, Sri Lanka and the Gulf of Bengal to eastern Polynesia
