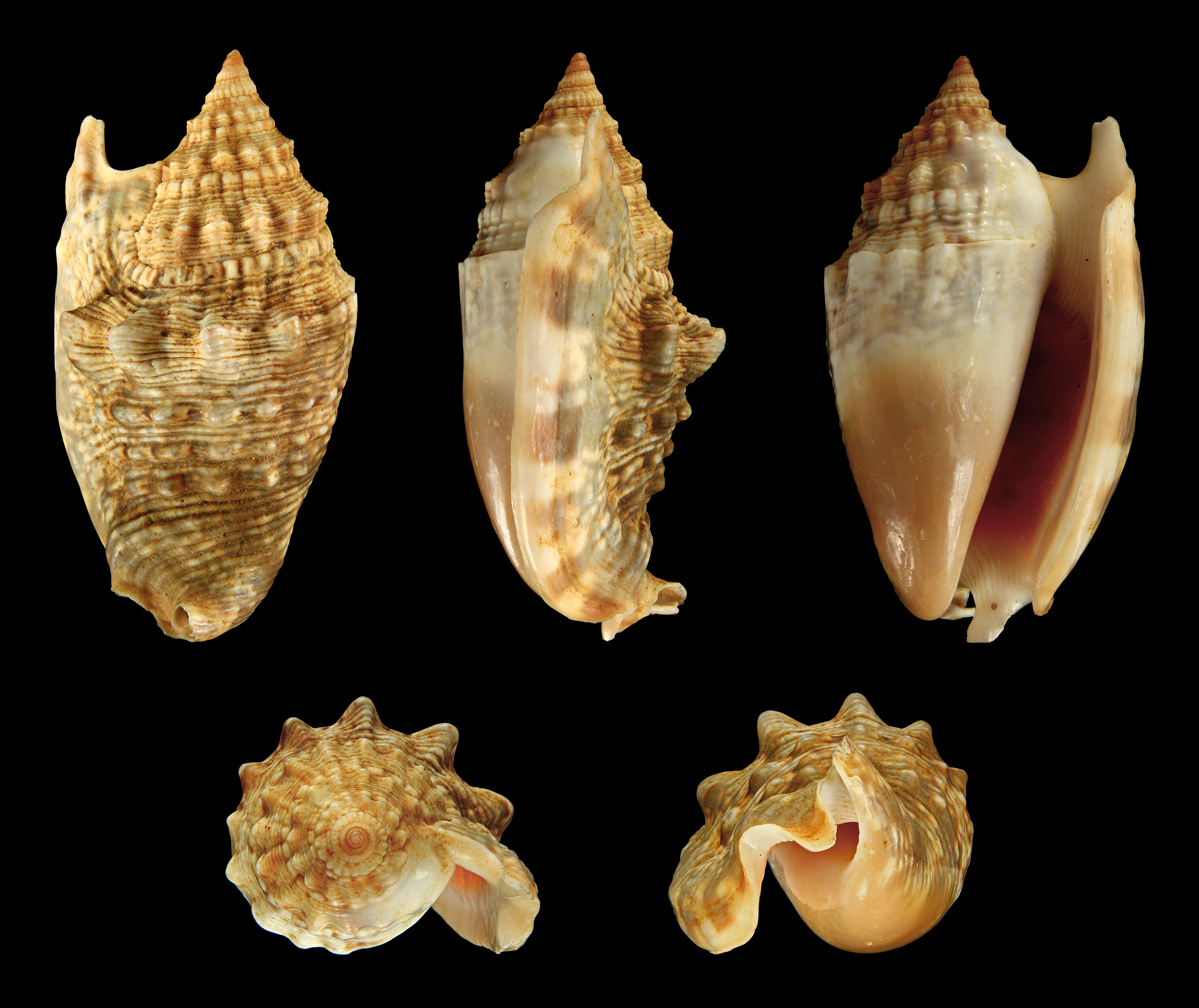
- Five views of a shell of Euprotomus aurisdianae

Scientific classification
- Kingdom: Animalia
- Phylum: Mollusca
- Class: Gastropoda
- Subclass: Caenogastropoda
- Order: Littorinimorpha
- Superfamily: Stromboidea
- Family: Strombidae
- Genus: Euprotomus; Gill, 1870

Type species
- Strombus aurisdianae Linnaeus, C., 1758

Species
- See text

Synonyms
- Monodactylus Mörch, 1852 (Invalid: junior homonym of Monodactylus Lacépède, 1802 [Pisces]); Strombus (Euprotomus) Gill, 1870

= Euprotomus =

Genus of gastropods

Euprotomus is a genus of sea snails, marine gastropod mollusks in the family Strombidae, the true conchs.

== Species ==
Species within the genus Euprotomus include:

- Euprotomus aratrum (Röding, 1798)
- Euprotomus aurisdianae (Linnaeus, 1758)
- Euprotomus aurora Kronenberg, 2002
- Euprotomus bulla (Röding, 1798)
- Euprotomus chrysostomus (Kuroda, 1942)
- Euprotomus hawaiensis (Pilsbry, 1917, "1918")
- Euprotomus hirasei (Kuroda, 1942)
- Euprotomus iredalei (Abbott, 1960)
- Euprotomus vomer (Röding, 1798)

Species brought into synonymy

- Euprotomus donnellyi Iredale, 1931: synonym of Euprotomus vomer (Röding, 1798)
- Euprotomus kiwi (Bozzetti, L. & D.M. Sargent, 2011): synonym of Euprotomus vomer (Röding, 1798)
