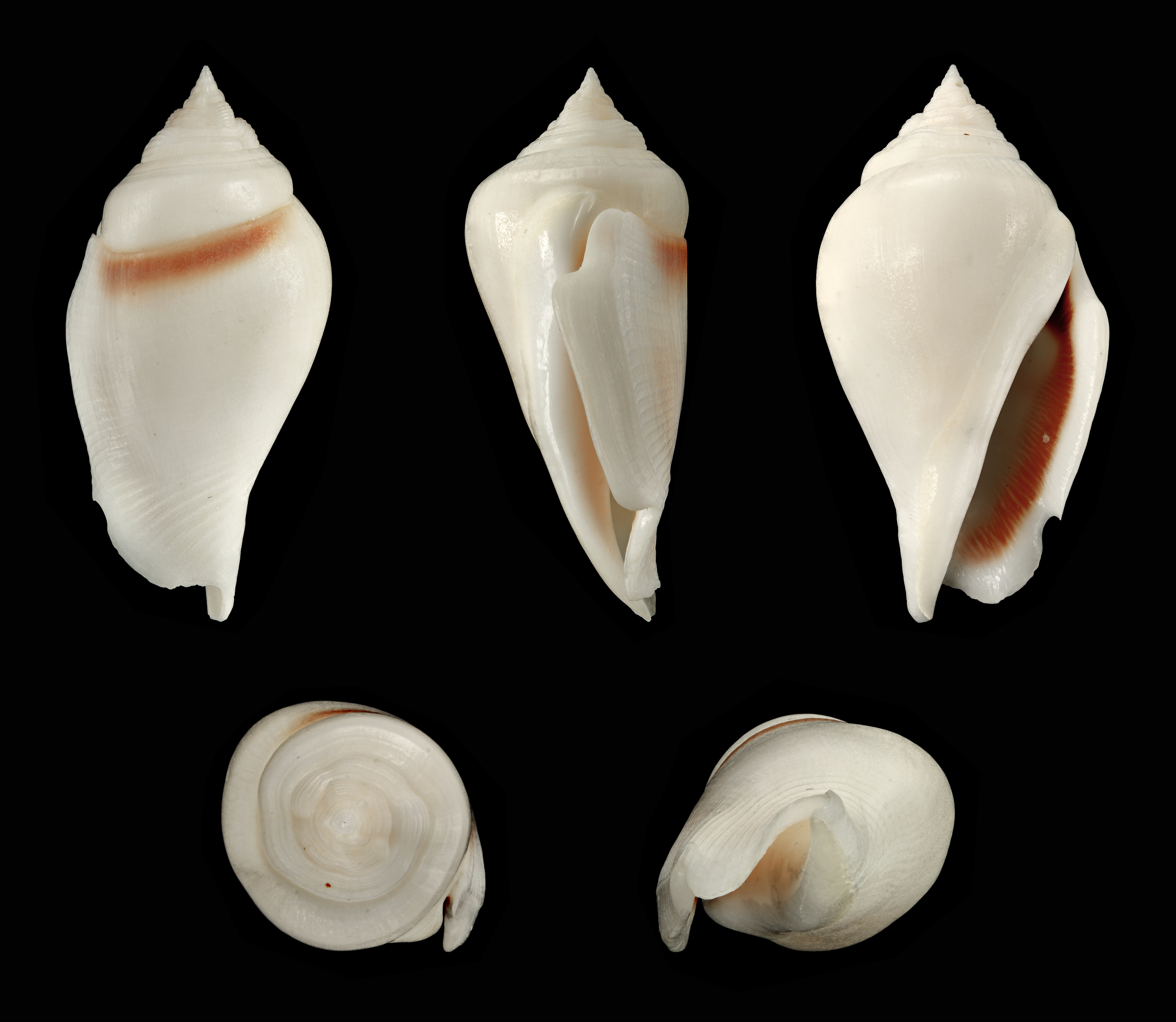
- Five views of a shell of Gibberulus gibberulus Mörch, 1850

Scientific classification
- Kingdom: Animalia
- Phylum: Mollusca
- Class: Gastropoda
- Subclass: Caenogastropoda
- Order: Littorinimorpha
- Family: Strombidae
- Genus: Gibberulus
- Species: G. gibberulus

Binomial name
- Gibberulus gibberulus (Linnaeus, 1758)

Synonyms
- Aporrhais gibberulus Mörch, 1852; Canarium gibberulum Frauenfeld, 1869; Gibberulus gibberulus gibberulus (Linnaeus, 1758) · accepted, alternate representation; Oostrombus gibberulus Cotton, B.C. 1953; Strombus gibberulus Linnaeus, 1758 (original combination); Strombus gibberulus Linnaeus, 1758; Strombus labiatus Perry, 1811

= Gibberulus gibberulus =

Species of gastropod

Gibberulus gibberulus, common name the humpbacked conch, is a species of sea snail, a marine gastropod mollusk in the family Strombidae, the true conchs.

There are two subspecies :

- Gibberulus gibberulus albus (Mörch, 1850)
- Gibberulus gibberulus gibberulus (Linnaeus, 1758): represented as Gibberulus gibberulus (Linnaeus, 1758) (alternate representation)
- Gibberulus gibberulus gibbosus (Röding, 1798) (synonyms: Gibberulus gibbosus (Röding, 1798); Lambis gibbosa Röding, 1798 (original combination))

== Description ==
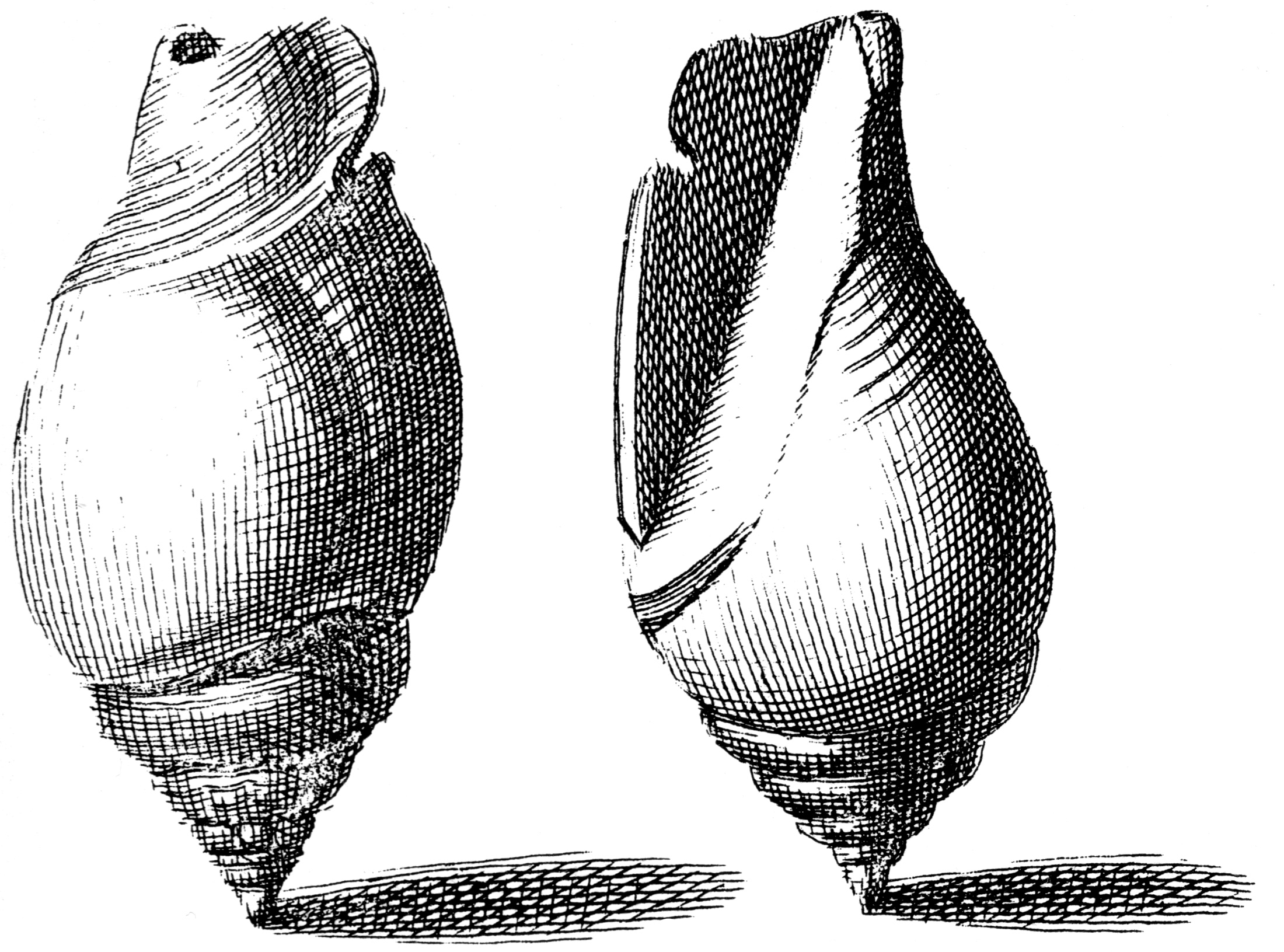
Shell of Gibberulus gibberulus (Index Testarum Conchyliorum (1742) of Niccolò Gualtieri)

The adult shell size varies between 30 mm and 70 mm. The smooth shell is gibbous. The spire is occasionally varicose. The body whorl is grooved at the base. The columella is smooth. The interior of the aperture is radiately striate. The shell is mottled and hieroglyphically marked with yellowish brown and white. The markings are often arranged in a few or numerous interrupted revolving bands. The aperture is tinged violaceous, scarlet or dark purplish brown.

== Distribution ==
This species occurs in the Red Sea and in the Indian Ocean off Aldabra, Chagos, Kenya, Madagascar, Mauritius, Mozambique, the Seychelles and Tanzania; in the Pacific Ocean off Australia (Northern Territory, Queensland and Western Australia).
