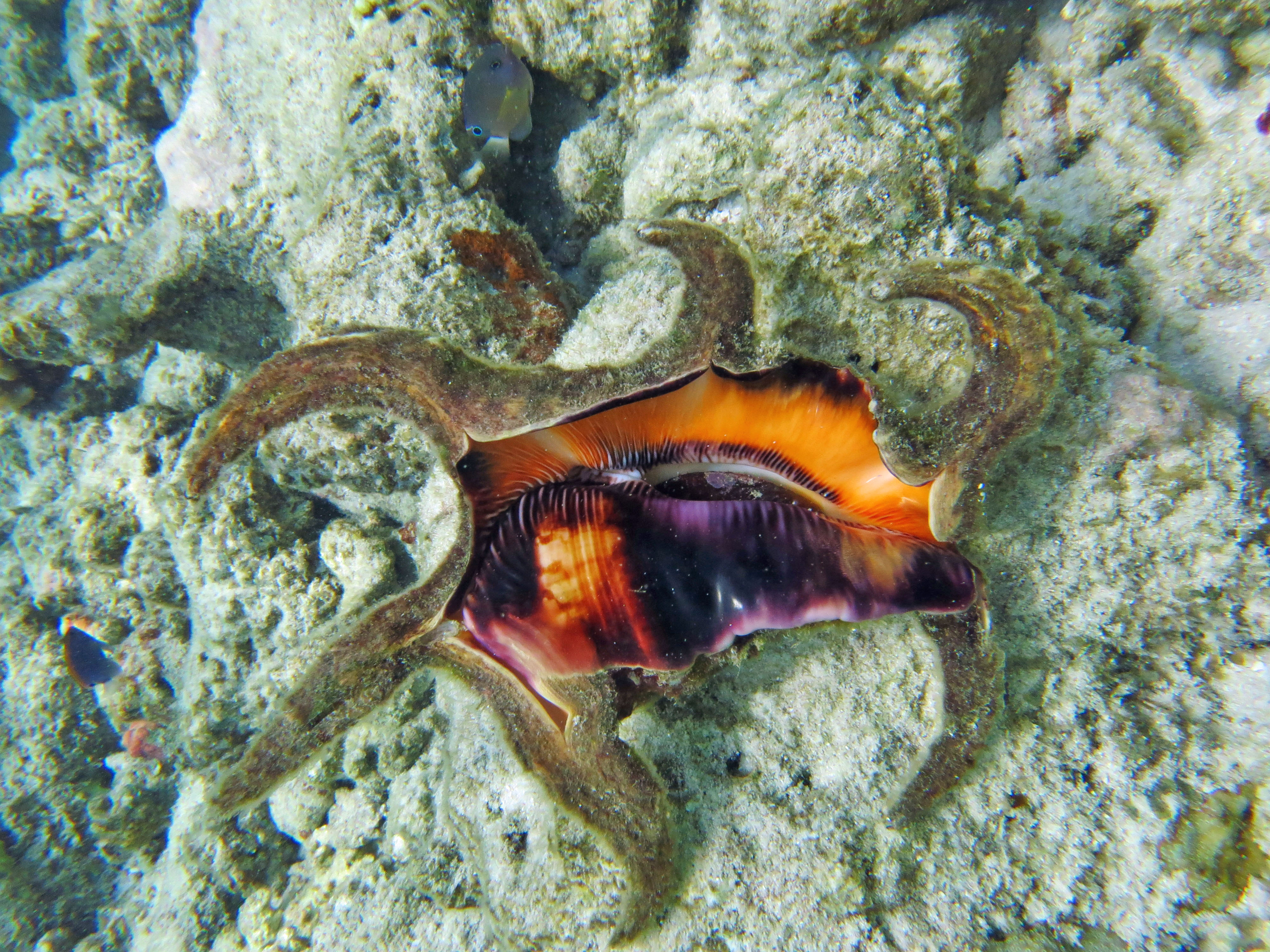
- Harpago arthriticus

Scientific classification
- Kingdom: Animalia
- Phylum: Mollusca
- Class: Gastropoda
- Subclass: Caenogastropoda
- Order: Littorinimorpha
- Family: Strombidae
- Genus: Harpago
- Species: H. arthriticus

Binomial name
- Harpago arthriticus (Röding, 1798)

Synonyms
- Harpago arthritica (incorrect gender ending); Lambis arthritica Röding, 1798 (basionym); Lambis chiragra arthritica (Röding, 1798); Strombus divergens Perry, 1811; Strombus nigricans Perry, 1811

= Harpago arthriticus =

Species of gastropod

Harpago arthriticus, common name the arthritic spider conch, is a species of sea snail, a marine gastropod mollusk in the family Strombidae, the true conchs.

== Description ==
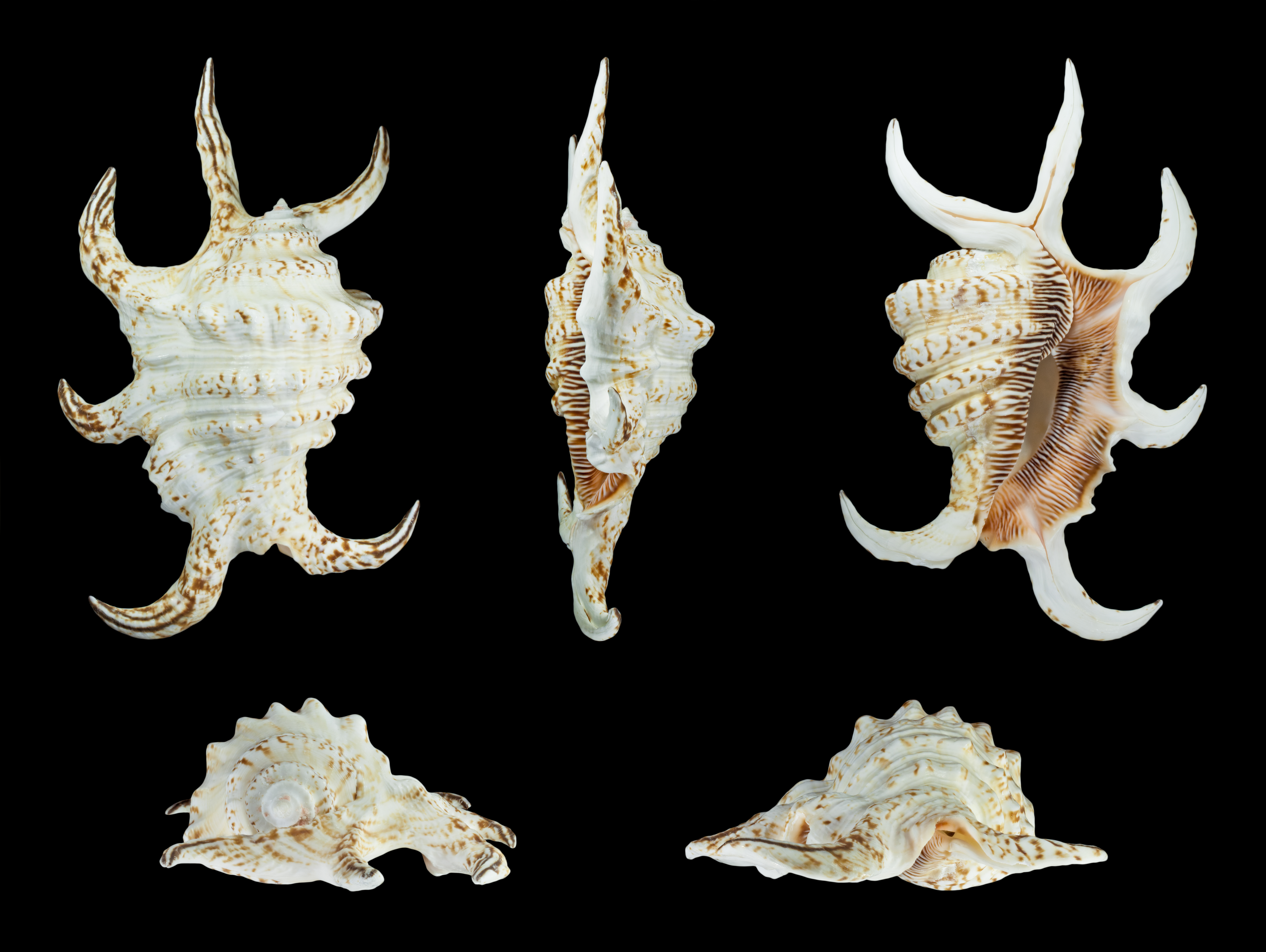
Multiple views of the shell

The size of an adult shell varies between 110 millimetres (4.3 in) and 190 millimetres (7.5 in).

=== Sex differences ===
There are no significant, officially-reported differences between the shells of the males and females.

== Distribution ==
This species is distributed in the Indian Ocean along the Aldabra Atoll, Kenya, Madagascar, the Maldives, the Mascarene Basin, Mauritius, Mozambique, Réunion, the Seychelles and Tanzania; in the Pacific Ocean along the Philippines.
