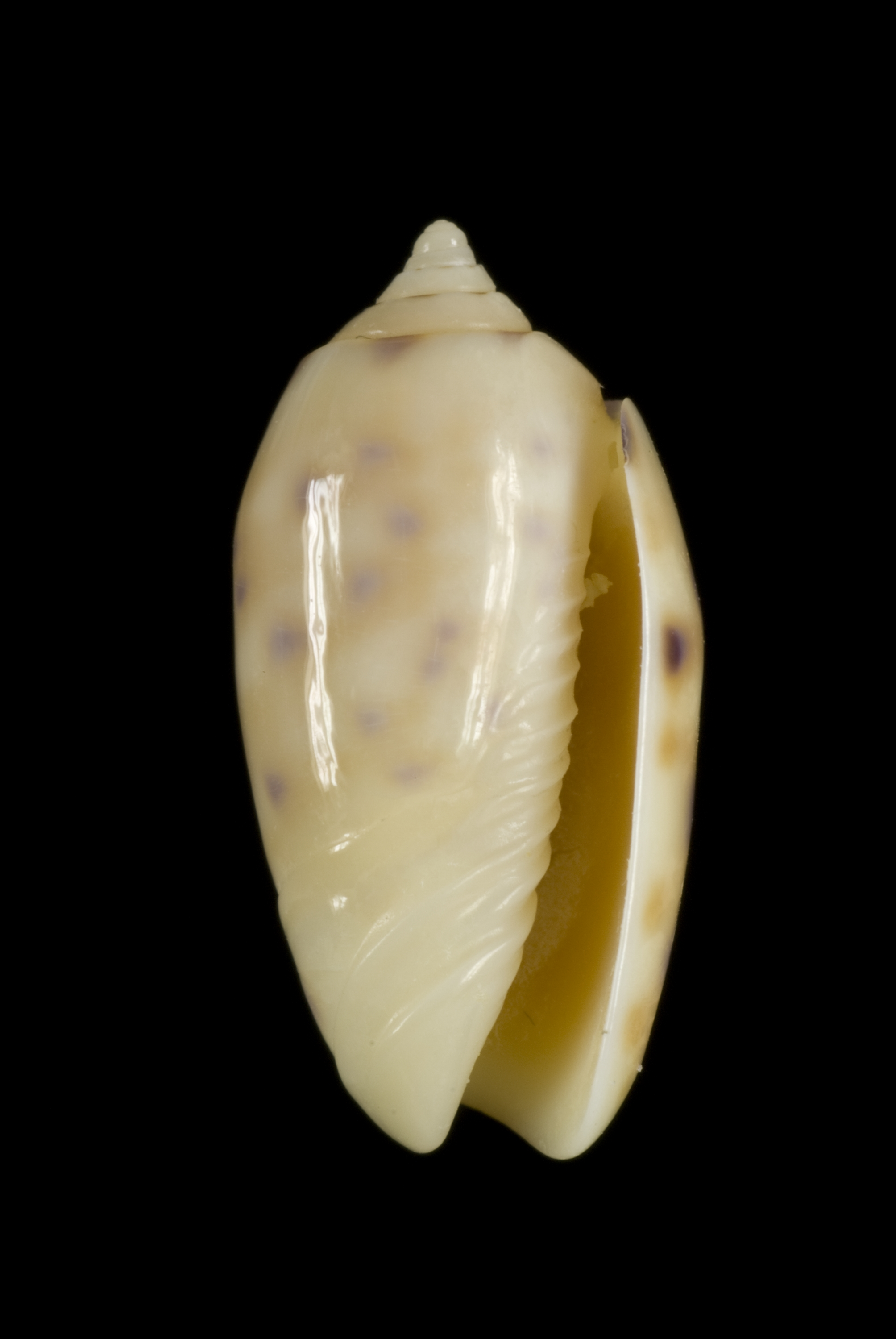
- Shell of Oliva amethystina (speicmen at MNHN, Paris)

Scientific classification
- Kingdom: Animalia
- Phylum: Mollusca
- Class: Gastropoda
- Subclass: Caenogastropoda
- Order: Neogastropoda
- Family: Olividae
- Genus: Oliva
- Species: O. amethystina

Binomial name
- Oliva amethystina (Röding, 1798)

Synonyms
- Oliva annulata Gmelin, 1791 (nomen dubium); Oliva emicator var. carnicolor Dautzenberg, 1927; Oliva emicator var. nebulosa Dautzenberg, 1927; Porphyria amethystina Röding, 1798 (original combination); Porphyria aurata Link, 1807

= Oliva amethystina =

Species of gastropod

Oliva amethystina is a species of sea snail, a marine gastropod mollusk in the family Olividae, the olives.

Subspecies

- Oliva amethystina amethystina (Röding, 1798)
- Oliva amethystina guttata Lamarck, 1811

== Description ==
Shell size 35 mm.

== Distribution ==
This marine species occurs off Philippines, Papua New Guinea, and off Queensland, Australia.
