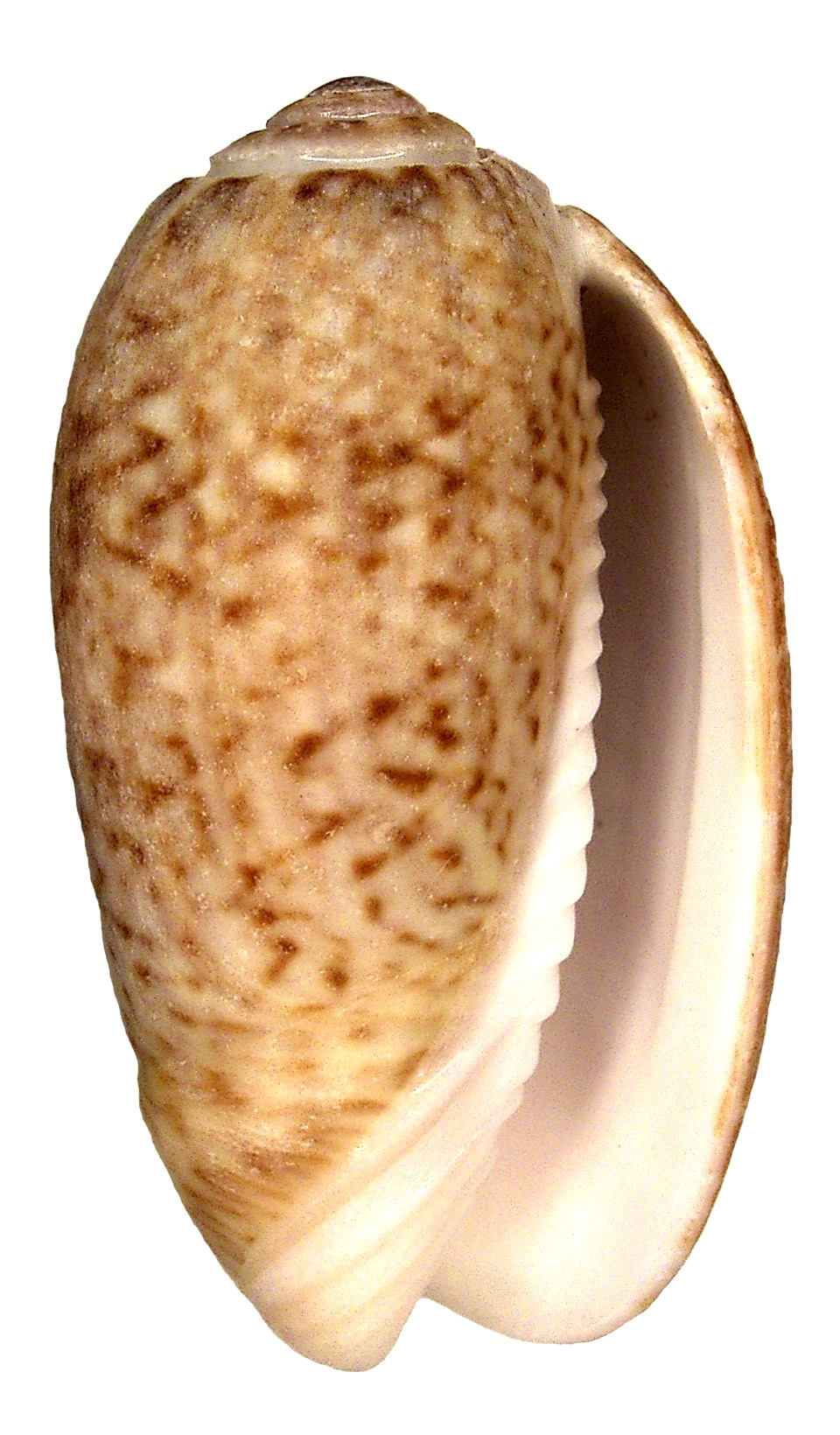

Scientific classification
- Kingdom: Animalia
- Phylum: Mollusca
- Class: Gastropoda
- Subclass: Caenogastropoda
- Order: Neogastropoda
- Family: Olividae
- Genus: Oliva
- Species: O. spicata

Binomial name
- Oliva spicata (Röding, 1798)

Synonyms
- Oliva araneosa Lamarck, 1811; Oliva brunnea Marrat, 1871; Oliva cumingii Reeve, 1850; Oliva fuscata Marrat, 1870; Oliva intertincta Carpenter, 1857; Oliva ionopsis Berry, 1969; Oliva ligneola Reeve, 1850; Oliva melchersi Menke, 1851; Oliva oniska Duclos, 1844; Oliva punctata Marrat, 1871; Oliva rejecta J. Q. Burch & R. L. Burch, 1962; Oliva spicata spicata (Röding, 1798)· accepted, alternate representation; Oliva spicata var. hemphilli Ford in Johnson, 1915; Oliva spicata var. perfecta Johnson, 1911; Oliva subangulata corteziana Petuch & Sargent, 1986; Porphyria arachnoidea Röding, 1798; Porphyria spicata Röding, 1798 (original combination)

= Oliva spicata =

Species of gastropod

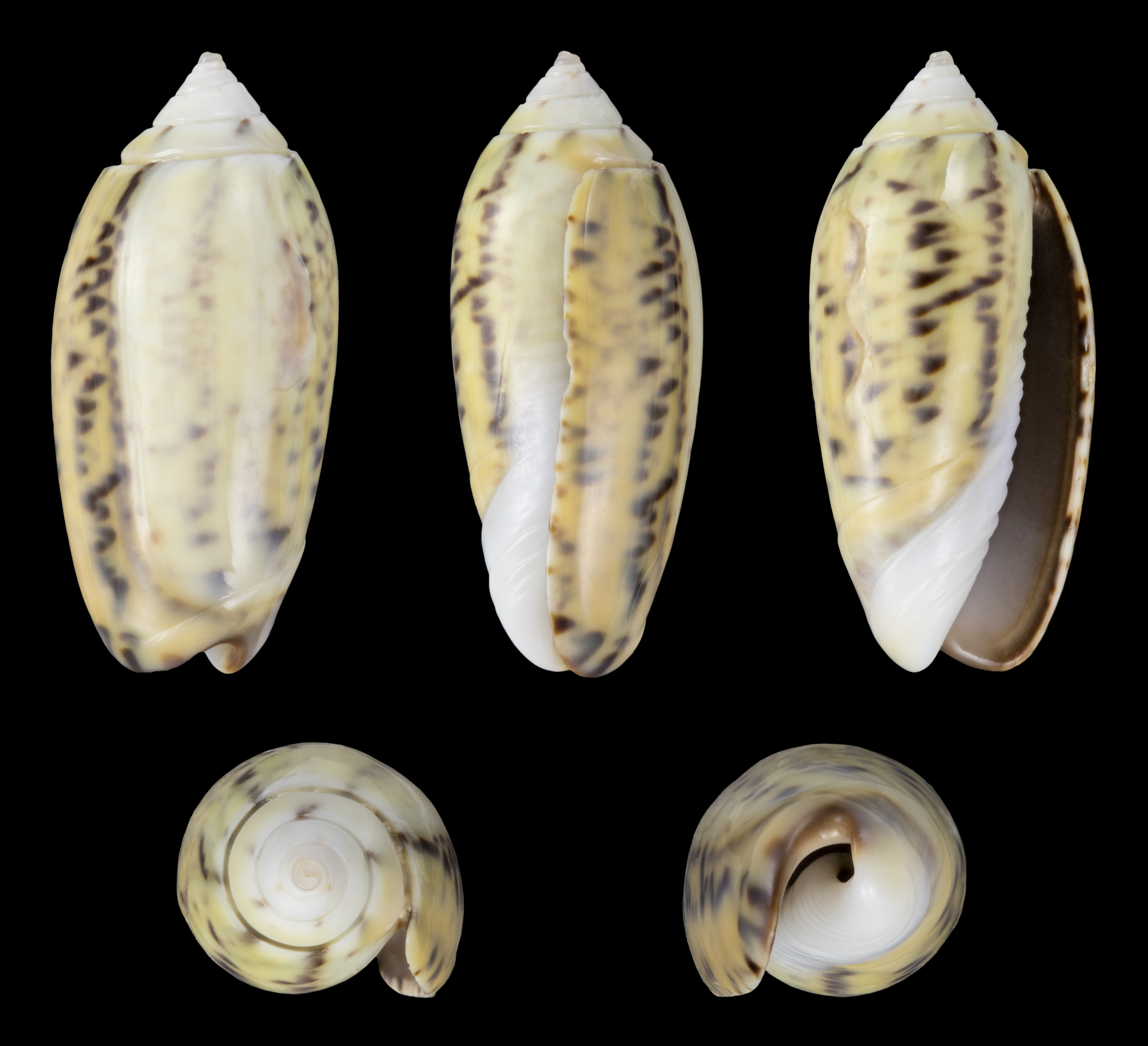
var. violacea

Oliva spicata, common name the veined olive, is a species of sea snail, a marine gastropod mollusk in the family Olividae, the olives.

== Subspecies and varieties ==
- Oliva spicata deynzerae Petuch & Sargent, 1986: synonym of Americoliva deynzerae (Petuch & Sargent, 1986): synonym of Oliva deynzerae Petuch & Sargent, 1986 (basionym)
- Oliva spicata var. hemphilli Ford in Johnson, 1915: synonym of Oliva spicata spicata (Röding, 1798) represented as Oliva spicata (Röding, 1798)
- Oliva spicata var. perfecta Johnson, 1911: synonym of Oliva spicata spicata (Röding, 1798) represented as Oliva spicata (Röding, 1798)

== Description ==
The length of the shell varies between 25 mm and 85 mm.

== Distribution ==
This marine species occurs between the Gulf of California and Peru.
