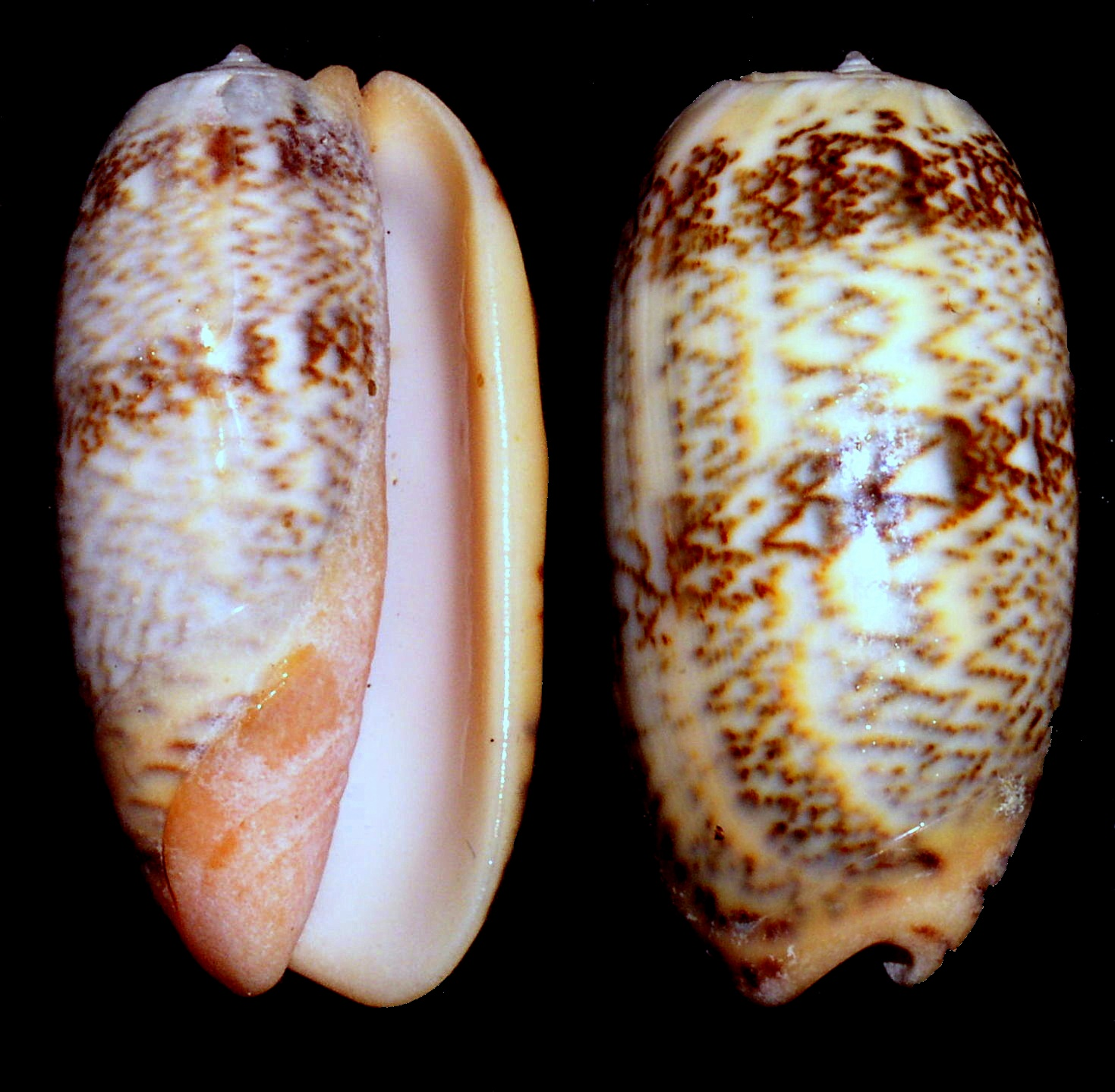

Scientific classification
- Kingdom: Animalia
- Phylum: Mollusca
- Class: Gastropoda
- Subclass: Caenogastropoda
- Order: Neogastropoda
- Family: Olividae
- Genus: Oliva
- Species: O. vidua

Binomial name
- Oliva vidua (Röding, 1798)

Synonyms
- Oliva cinnamonea Mencke, 1830; Oliva fabreii Ducros de Saint Germain, 1857; Oliva fulminans Lamarck, 1811; Oliva fusca Perry, G., 1811; Oliva grata Marrat, 1871; Oliva inornata Marrat, 1870; Oliva lutea Marrat, 1871; Oliva maura Lamarck, 1811; Oliva propinqua Marrat, 1870; Oliva sepulturalis Lamarck, 1811; Oliva (Oliva) angustata Marrat, F.P., 1868; Oliva (Oliva) fabrei Ducros De St.Germain, A.M.P., 1857; Oliva (Oliva) grata Marrat, F.P., 1871; Oliva (Oliva) maura Lamarck, J.B.P.A. de, 1811; Oliva (Oliva) mauritiana Marrat, F.P., 1871; Oliva (Viduoliva) vidua (Röding, 1798); Porphyria vidua Röding, 1798 (original combination)

= Oliva vidua =

Species of gastropod

Oliva vidua, common name the black olive, is a species of sea snail, a marine gastropod mollusk in the family Olividae, the olives.

== Description ==
The length of the shell varies between 28 mm and 70 mm.

This species was responsible for five fatal cases of neurotoxic food poisoning in Sabah, Malaysia.

== Distribution ==
Oliva vidua is endemic to the tropical Indo-Pacific Ocean, occurring in the Mascarene Basin, the Bay of Bengal, the Philippines, Indonesia, Australia, and New Guinea.
