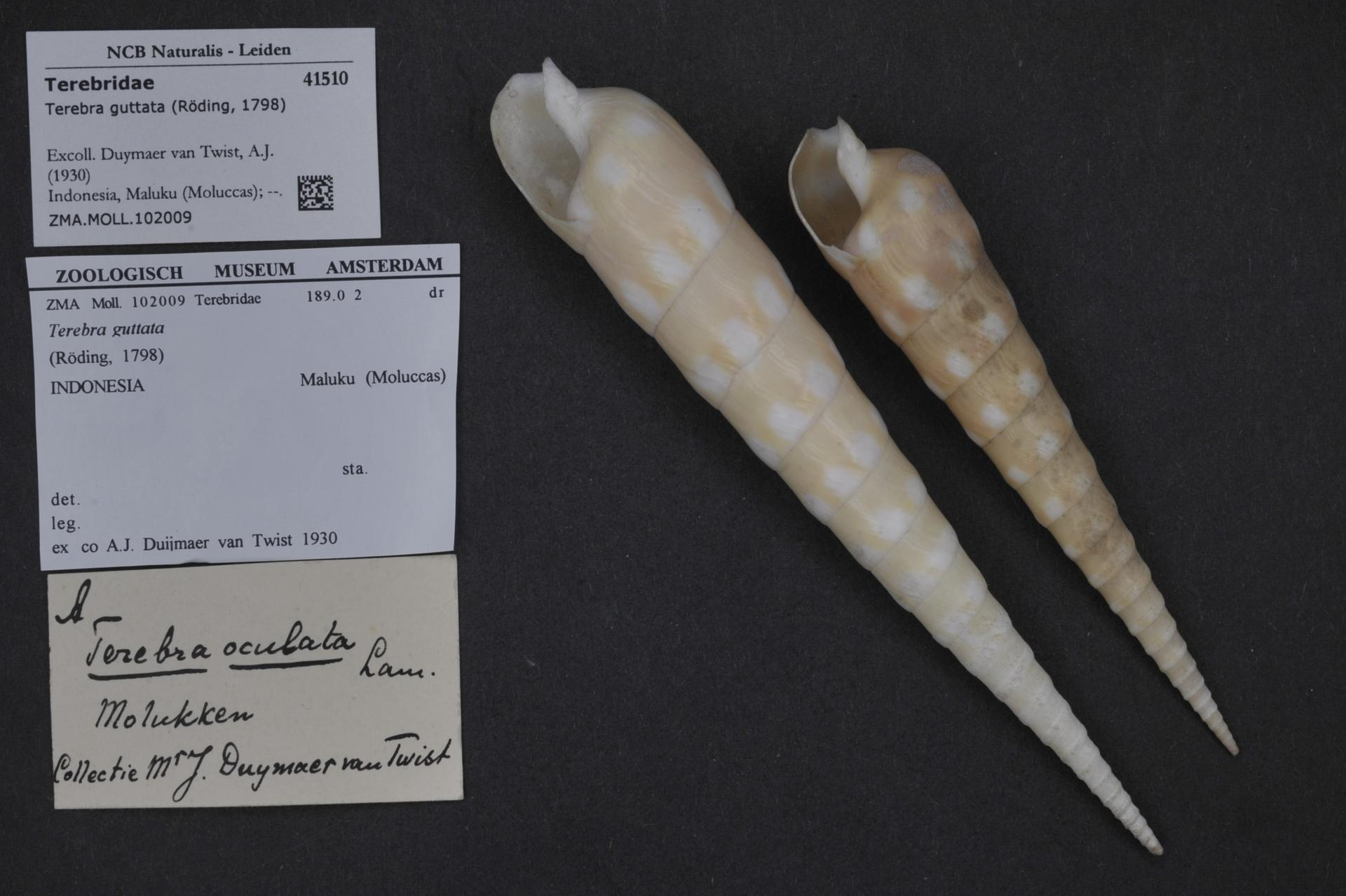

Scientific classification
- Kingdom: Animalia
- Phylum: Mollusca
- Class: Gastropoda
- Subclass: Caenogastropoda
- Order: Neogastropoda
- Superfamily: Conoidea
- Family: Terebridae
- Genus: Terebra
- Species: T. guttata

Binomial name
- Terebra guttata (Röding, 1798)

Synonyms
- Buccinum candidum Born, 1778; Buccinum oculatum Dillwyn, 1817; Epitonium guttatum Röding, 1798; Terebra laevis Grau, 1834; Terebra loroisi Deshayes, 1859; Terebra nebulosa Lorois, 1858; Terebra oculata Lamarck, 1822; Terebra sculptilis Pease, 1869

= Terebra guttata =

Species of gastropod

Terebra guttata, common name the eyed auger, is a species of sea snail, a marine gastropod mollusk in the family Terebridae, the auger snails.

== Distribution ==
This species occurs in the Indian Ocean off Tanzania, Aldabra, Chagos and the Mascarene Basin.
