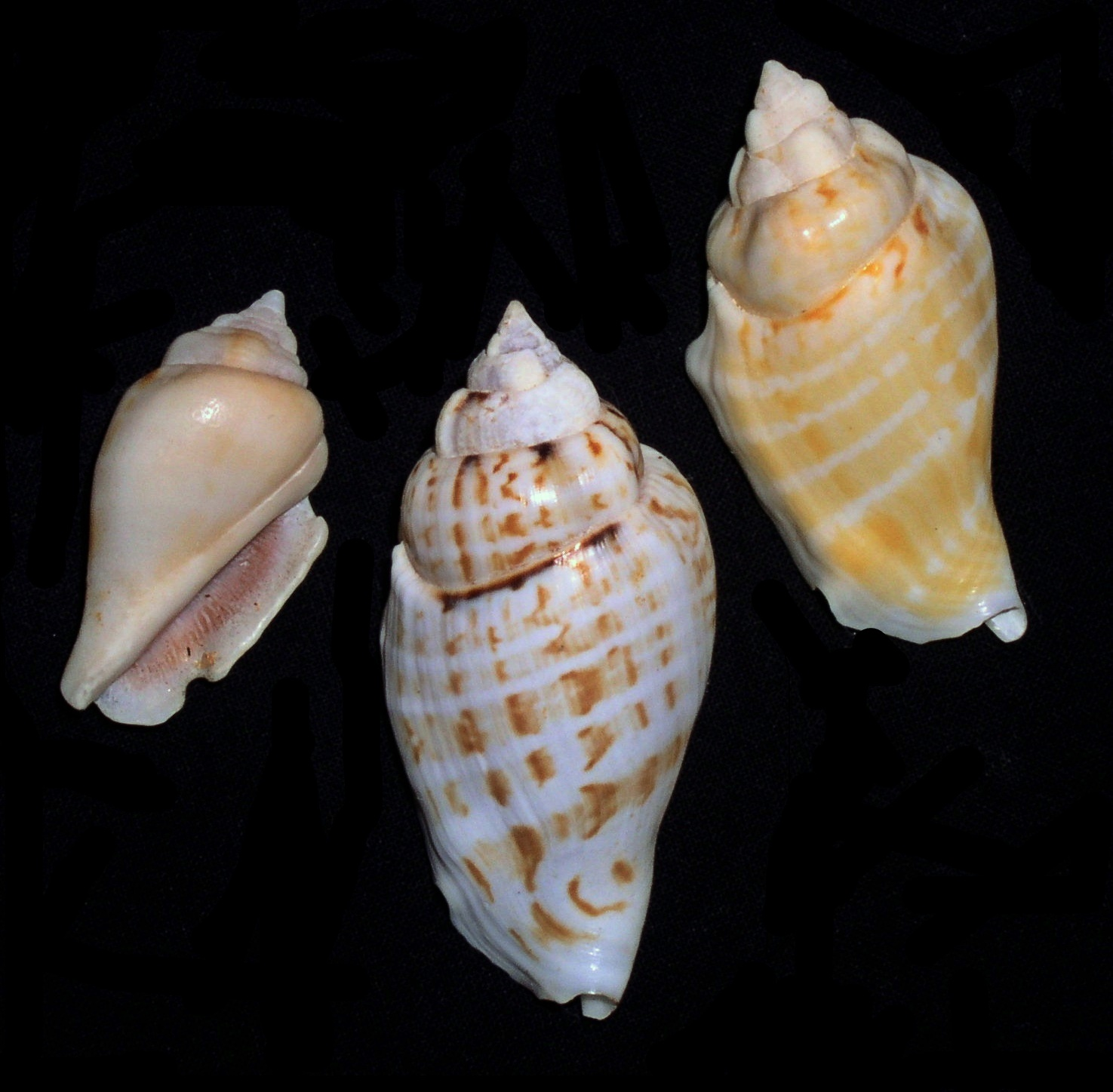
- Three shells of Gibberulus gibberulus gibbosus

Scientific classification
- Kingdom: Animalia
- Phylum: Mollusca
- Class: Gastropoda
- Subclass: Caenogastropoda
- Order: Littorinimorpha
- Superfamily: Stromboidea
- Family: Strombidae
- Genus: Gibberulus; Jousseaume, 1888

Type species
- Strombus gibberulus Linnaeus, 1758

Synonyms
- Strombus (Gibberulus) Jousseaume, 1888

= Gibberulus =

Genus of gastropods

Gibberulus is a genus of sea snails, marine gastropod mollusks in the family Strombidae, the true conchs.

== Species ==
Species within the genus Gibberulus include:

- Gibberulus albus (Mörch, 1850)
- Gibberulus gibberulus (Linnaeus, 1758)

Species brought into synonymy

- Gibberulus gibbosus (Röding, 1798): synonym of Gibberulus gibberulus gibbosus (Röding, 1798)
