= Euprotomus aurora =

Scientific classification
- Kingdom: Animalia
- Phylum: Mollusca
- Class: Gastropoda
- Subclass: Caenogastropoda
- Order: Littorinimorpha
- Family: Strombidae
- Genus: Euprotomus
- Species: E. aurora

Binomial name
- Euprotomus aurora Kronenberg, 2002

Species of gastropod

Euprotomus aurora is a species of sea snail, a marine gastropod mollusc in the family Strombidae, the true conchs. It is found in the Indian Ocean. This species has long been confused with the similar Euprotomus aurisdianae, which is a West Pacific species.

== Distribution ==
This species is found in the Indian Ocean, from the Red Sea and East African coast to India and Sri Lanka, possibly as far east as northwestern Sumatra, Indonesia, and among islands of the Indian Ocean such as Mauritius, Réunion, and the Andaman Islands. The type locality is in the Seychelles.
