= Berlin Society of Friends of Natural Science =

The Berlin Society of Friends of Natural Science, (Gesellschaft Naturforschender Freunde zu Berlin, in German) (GNF) is a scientific society, one of the most important such societies of the late 18th century. After the Danziger Naturforschenden Gesellschaft, it is the oldest private natural society in Germany. It was founded in 1773 by F.H.W. Martini, and originally was based around 12 experts in the natural sciences who visited each other's collections and built up a collection and library for the society. The society also published a journal, in which great care was taken to publish accurate illustrations.

The society exists still, with about 140 members. After a decade of inactivity following the Second World War, it has since been associated with the Free University of Berlin.

== Early Members ==
- Friedrich Heinrich Wilhelm Martini (1729-1778)
- Johann Gottlieb Gleditsch (1714-1786)
- Marcus Eliesar Bloch (1723-1799)
- Martin Heinrich Klaproth (1743-1817)
- Dietrich Ludwig Gustav Karsten (1768-1810)
- Adelbert von Chamisso (1781-1838)
- Alexander von Humboldt (1769-1859)
- Otto Friedrich Müller (1730-1784)
- Carl Eduard von Martens (1831-1904)
- Hinrich Lichtenstein (1780-1857)
- Christian Samuel Weiss (1780-1856)
- Hermann Steudner (1832-1863)
