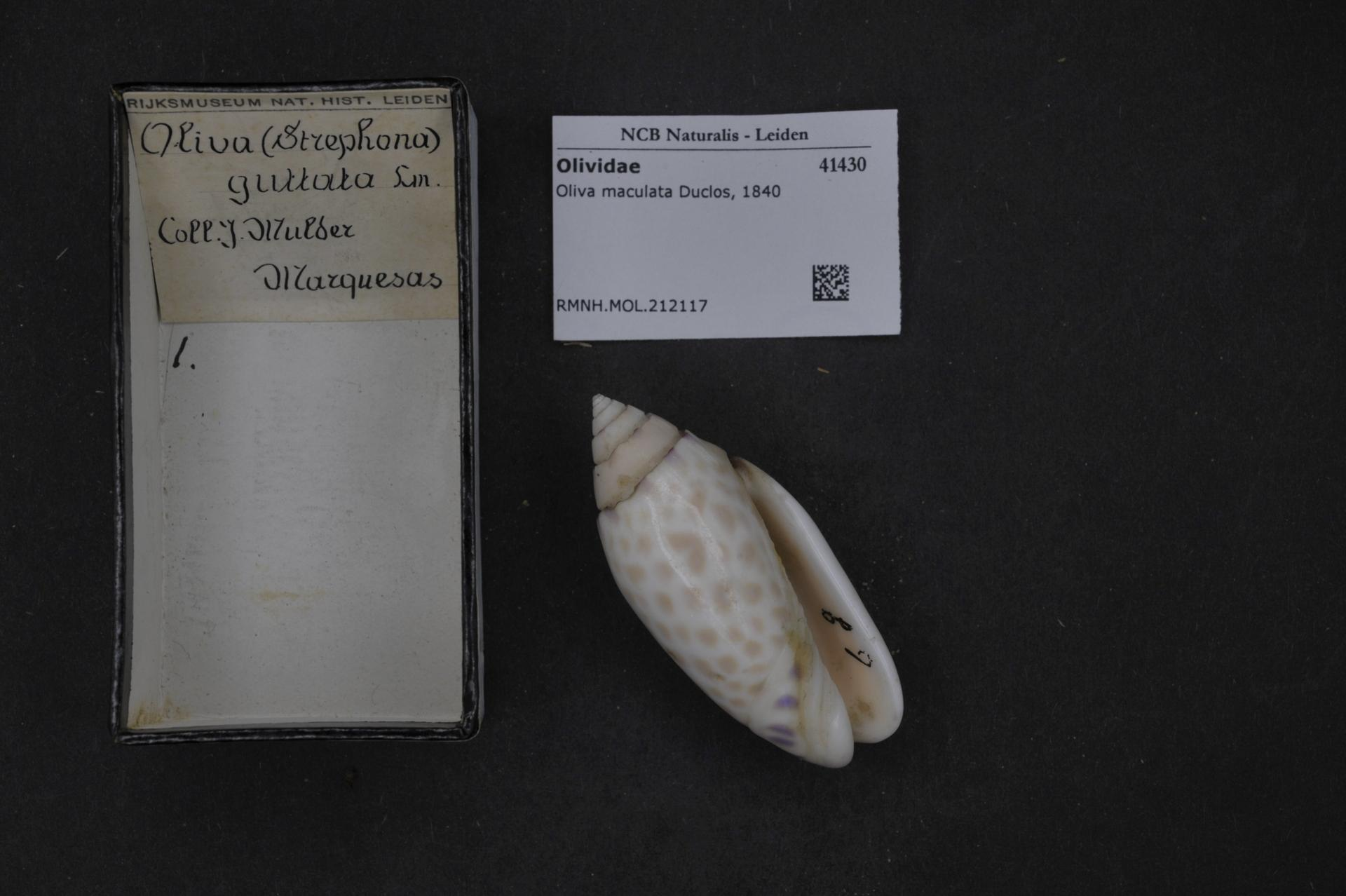

Scientific classification
- Kingdom: Animalia
- Phylum: Mollusca
- Class: Gastropoda
- Subclass: Caenogastropoda
- Order: Neogastropoda
- Family: Olividae
- Genus: Oliva
- Species: O. amethystina
- Subspecies: O. a. guttata

Trinomial name
- Oliva amethystina guttata Lamarck, 1811

Synonyms
- Oliva guttata Lamarck, 1811

= Oliva amethystina guttata =

Subspecies of gastropod

Oliva amethystina guttata is a subspecies of Oliva amethystine, a sea snail, a marine gastropod mollusk in the family Olividae, the olives.
