= Dietrich Ludwig Gustav Karsten =

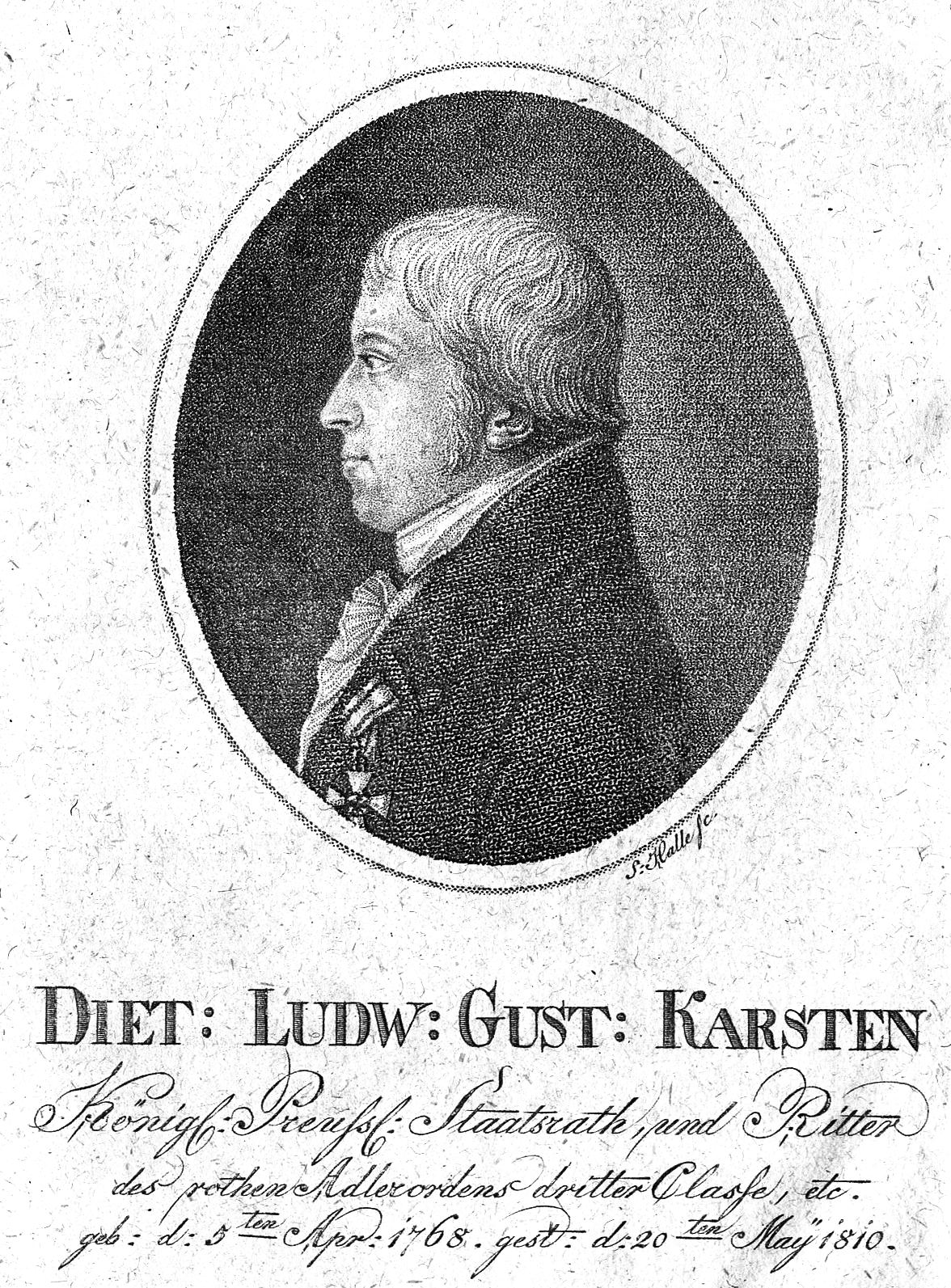
- Born: April 5, 1768
- Died: May 20, 1810 (aged 42)
- Occupation: Mineralogist

Dietrich Ludwig Gustav Karsten (5 April 1768 – 20 May 1810) was a German mineralogist. Among the most notable of Karsten's writings is a mineralogy book published in 1789 when he was only 21 years old. In later years Karsten held senior government positions in mining and mineralogy in the Kingdom of Prussia at Berlin.

Karsten was born in Bützow, Mecklenburg. His father was a mathematics professor (namely Wenceslaus Johann Gustav Karsten). The son as a teenager studied for four years at the Mining Academy of Freiberg, 1782–1786. A teacher at the Freiberg Mining Academy in those years was Abraham Gottlob Werner, who had recently developed an improved system for classifying minerals and rocks. An earlier student of Werner's, Nathanael Gottfried Leske, had collected a large set of mineral specimens in cooperation with Werner in the 1770s and 1780s. In 1788 Karsten organized and described Leske's collection using Werner's methodology and classification categories. This was published as a 600-page book in German in 1789 entitled "Leske's mineral collection systematically arranged and described". It incorporates information from an unpublished 1780s text of Werner, and it is the first book based on Werner's system. Werner's system was influential in mineralogy throughout Europe in late 18th and early 19th century, and Karsten was one of its leading proponents.

Karsten in the 1790s and 1800s continued working on improving the classification of minerals, and published a number of reports on the subject. He died suddenly at age 42 in Berlin.
