= Johann Hieronymus Chemnitz =

German clergyman

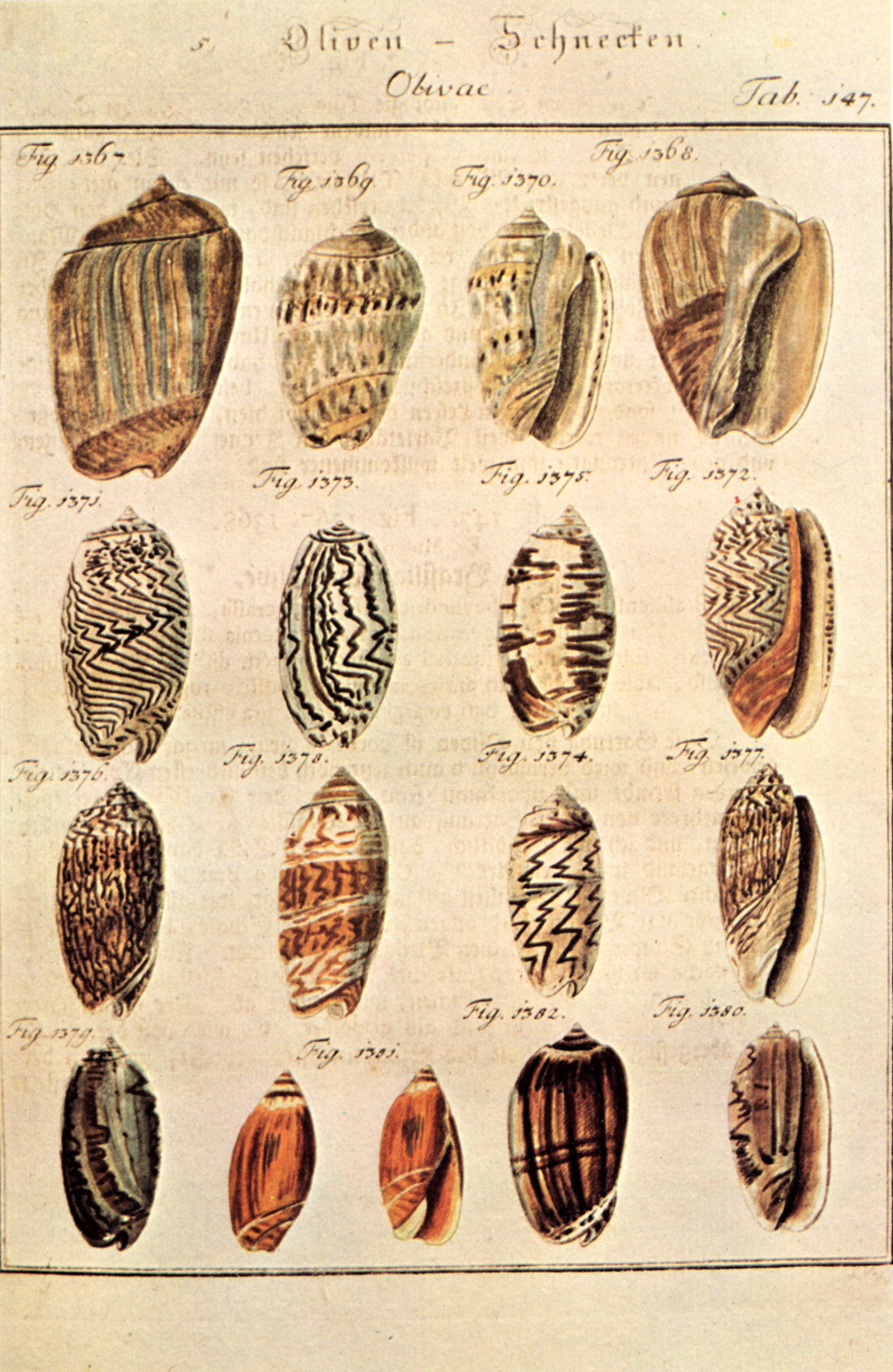
Plate representing Olividae from Neues systematisches Conchylien-Cabinet

Johann Hieronymus Chemnitz (10 October 1730 – 12 October 1800) was a German clergyman and conchologist from Magdeburg. From 1759 to 1768 he was Chaplain of the Danish Embassy in Vienna, then garrison Chaplain in Helsingør and Copenhagen.

Johann Chemnitz continued the work of Friedrich Wilhelm Martini (1729–1778), Neues systematisches Conchylien-Cabinet. He added to the three volumes previously published eight new volumes in 1779 and 1795. Although neither of the two authors use the binomial system, they are regarded as the authors of many species which were first described in this work. Chemnitz used many specimens from the cabinet of curiosities of the king of Denmark whose conservator was Lorenz Spengler (1720–1807). Chemnitz began with a collection of half shells before collecting whole shells. His patron was Christian Hee Hwass (1731–1803). The fifth volume describes and portrays many shells from New Zealand and some from Australia collected during Cook's voyages into the Pacific.

Conchylien-Cabinet von Martini und Chemnitz is an enormous work published from 1837 up to 1920 with nearly hundred sections, including some 4000 plates. The original work was continued by Heinrich Carl Küster and then Wilhelm Kobelt and Heinrich Conrad Weinkauff.

Chemnitz was a promoter of a form of natural theology known as testaceotheology or the use of molluscs for preaching.

He died in Copenhagen in 1800.
