= Friedrich Heinrich Wilhelm Martini =

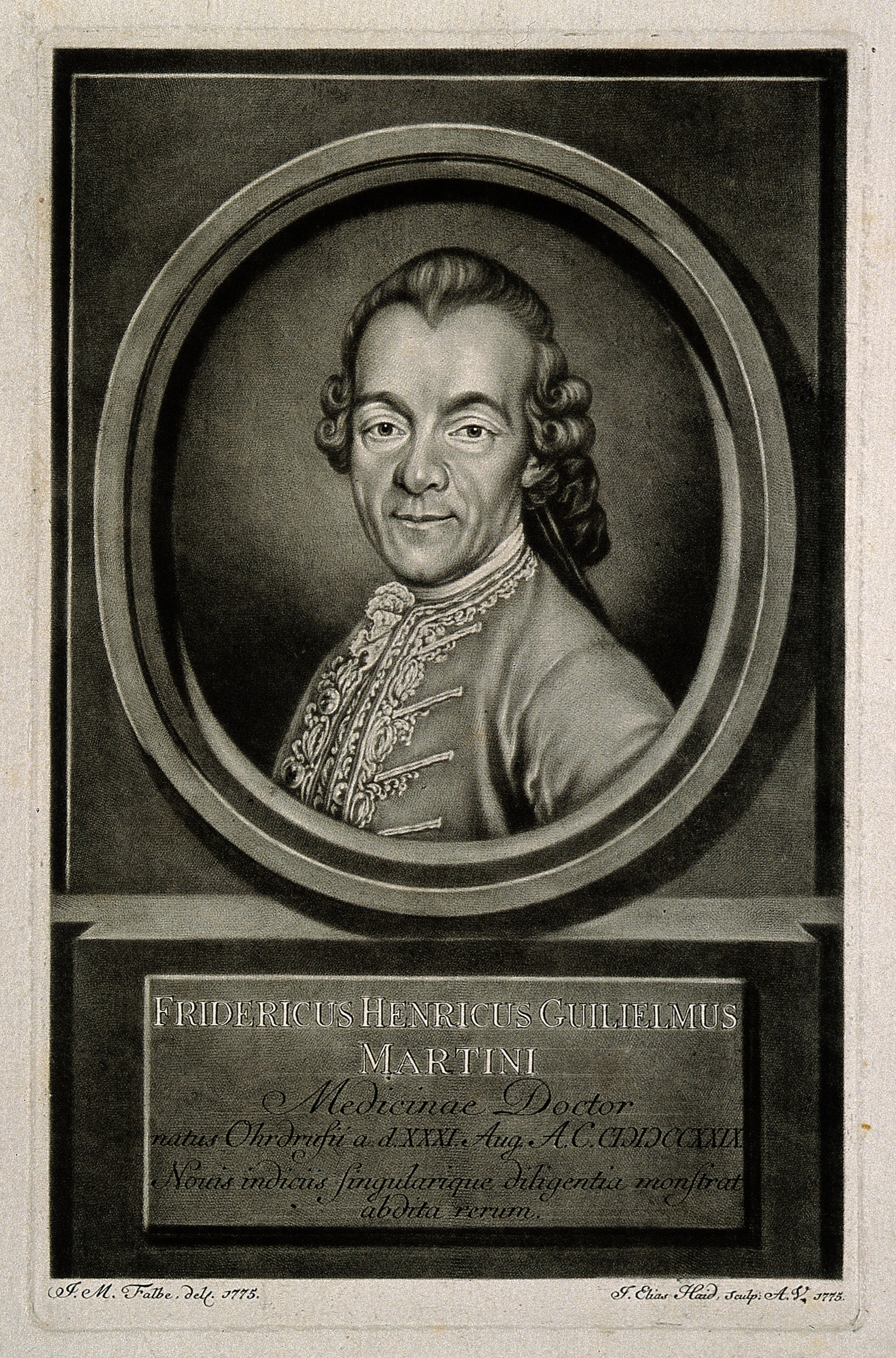
Mezzotint by J.E. Haid

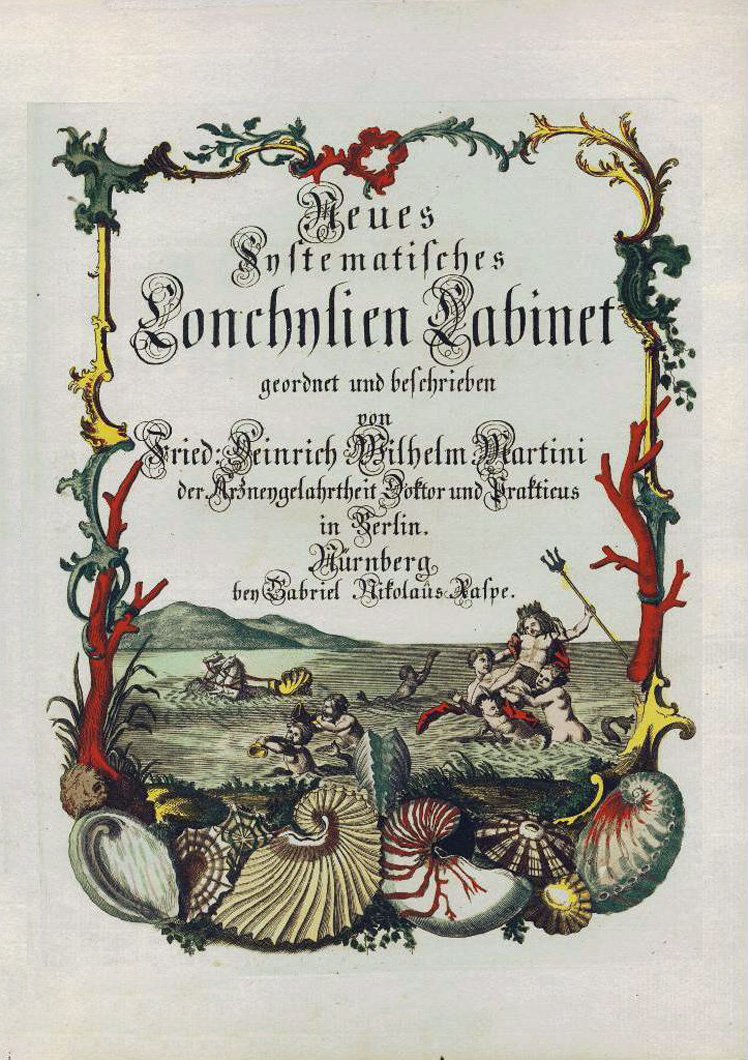
Frontispiece of the Neues systematisches Conchylien-Cabinet.

Friedrich Heinrich Wilhelm Martini (31 August 1729, Ohrdruf – 27 June 1778, Berlin) was a German physician, translator and conchologist.

Martini practised medicine in Berlin. In 1769, he began the colour-illustrated shell book Neues systematisches Conchylien-Cabinet, published by Gabriel Nikolaus Raspe at Nürnberg. He died following the publication of the third volume, after which the series was continued by Johann Hieronymus Chemnitz (1730–1800), who added eight volumes between 1779 and 1795. Because these volumes did not use the binomial system, the species names introduced are not considered valid. However, the specimens illustrated often became type specimens, because subsequently others referred to them when publishing valid descriptions. His shell collection was sold after his death but is now lost, probably deliberately disposed of in the 1970s.

In 1773, Martini founded the Berlinische Gesellschaft Naturforschender Freunde, consisting of a group of natural historians who visited each other's collections and built up a collection for the society. The society still exists today.
