= Peter Friedrich Röding =

German malacologist

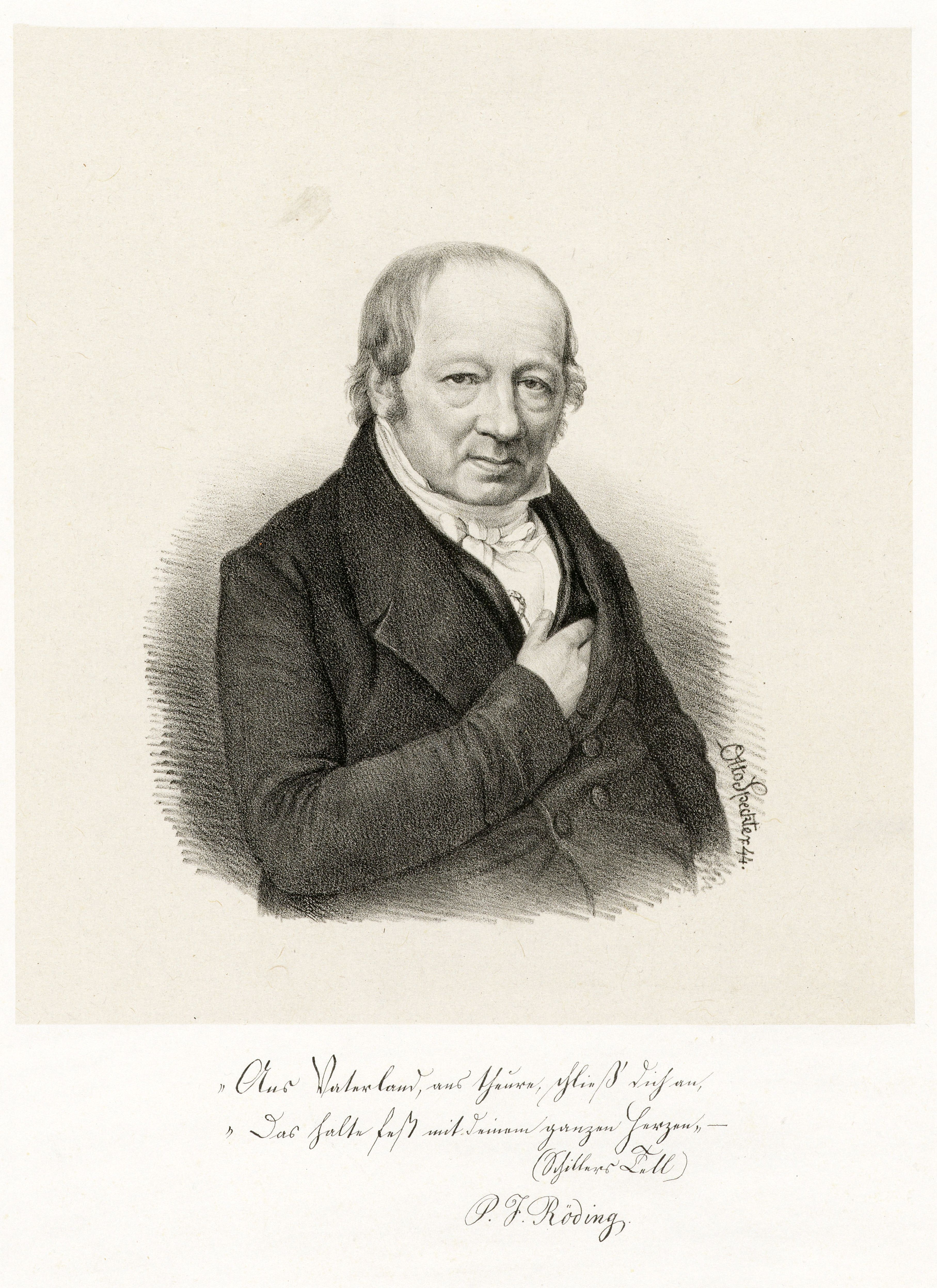
- Born: Peter Friedrich Röding; 17 June 1767
- Died: 8 June 1846 (aged 78)
- Scientific career
- Fields: Malacology

Peter Friedrich Röding (17 June 1767 – 8 June 1846) was a German malacologist who lived in Hamburg. Very little is known about this naturalist.

Many of Röding's descriptions (often simply a German rendition of the Latin binomial name) are of species which were first named by earlier authors such as Johann Hieronymus Chemnitz, Friedrich Wilhelm Martini and Martin Lister. Röding's references to pre-existing descriptions and figures make these names also valid, since they are unequivocally recognizable, and were (after Röding) subsequently adopted by many later authors.

== Museum Boltenianum ==
He was the principal author of a 1798 catalogue of an important mollusc collection. The catalogue was entitled Museum Boltenianum sive catalogus cimeliorum e tribus regnis naturæ quæ olim collegerat Joa. Fried Bolten, M. D. p. d. per XL. annos proto physicus Hamburgensis. Pars secunda continens conchylia sive testacea univalvia, bivalvia & multivalvia and was published in Hamburg. This was in fact a sale catalogue, and it was ignored as a taxonomic work until William Healey Dall recognized that it introduced new valid taxa, though with long names and short descriptions. Thus Röding is credited with naming many taxa.

Museum Boltenianum sive Catalogus…, the sale catalogue, is a rare book. Genera published in the anonymously authored work "Museum Boltenianum sive catalogus cimeliorum…" published in 1798 were for a long time ascribed to Joachim Friedrich Bolten, but are now considered to have been authored by Röding according to a ruling by the ICZN in 1956.
