= Singapore dollar =

Currency of Singapore

Dolar Singapura (Malay) 新加坡元 (Chinese) சிங்கப்பூர் வெள்ளி (Tamil)
- Singapore 10,000 dollar banknote

ISO 4217
- Code: SGD (numeric: 702)
- Subunit: 0.01

Units of account
- Base unit: dollar
- Plural: dollars (in English)
- Symbol: $
- Nickname: sing-dollar, sing
- Subunit
- 1/100: cent
- Plural
- cent: cents (in English)
- Symbol
- cent: ¢

Denominations
- Banknotes
- Freq. used: $2, $5, $10, $50, $100
- Rarely used: $1, $20; $25, $500, $1,000, $10,000 (discontinued, still legal tender), $10 (Commemorative), $20 (Commemorative), $25 (Commemorative), $50 (Commemorative)
- Coins
- Freq. used: 5c, 10c, 20c, 50c, $1
- Rarely used: 1c (discontinued in 2002, still legal tender, although may not be allowed to be used in some places)

Demographics
- Date of introduction: 12 June 1967; 59 years ago
- Replaced: Malaya and British Borneo dollar
- User(s): Singapore; Brunei

Issuance
- Monetary authority: Monetary Authority of Singapore
- Website: www.mas.gov.sg
- Mint: Singapore Mint
- Website: www.singaporemint.com

Valuation
- Inflation: 0.36% at 2024
- Pegged by: Brunei dollar at par

Singapore dollar

Chinese name
- Chinese: 新加坡元
Transcriptions
Standard Mandarin
- Hanyu Pinyin: Xīnjiāpō Yuán
- Wade–Giles: Hsin^{1}-chia^{1}-po^{1} yüan^{3}
- IPA: [ɕín tɕjá pʰwó ɥɛ̌n]

Malay name
- Malay: Dolar/Ringgit Singapura

Tamil name
- Tamil: சிங்கப்பூர் வெள்ளி Ciṅkappūr Veḷḷi

The Singapore dollar (sign: $; code: SGD) is the official currency of the Republic of Singapore. Each dollar is divided into 100 cents (Malay: sen, Chinese: 分; pinyin: fēn, Tamil: காசு, romanized: kācu). It is normally abbreviated with the dollar sign $, or S$ to distinguish it from other dollar-denominated currencies. The Monetary Authority of Singapore (MAS) issues the banknotes and coins of the Singapore dollar.

As of 2024, the Singapore dollar is the 13th most traded currency in the world. Apart from its use in Singapore, the Singapore dollar is also accepted as customary tender in Brunei according to the Currency Interchangeability Agreement between the Monetary Authority of Singapore and the Autoriti Monetari Brunei Darussalam (Monetary Authority of Brunei Darussalam). Likewise, the Brunei dollar is also customarily accepted in Singapore.

== History ==
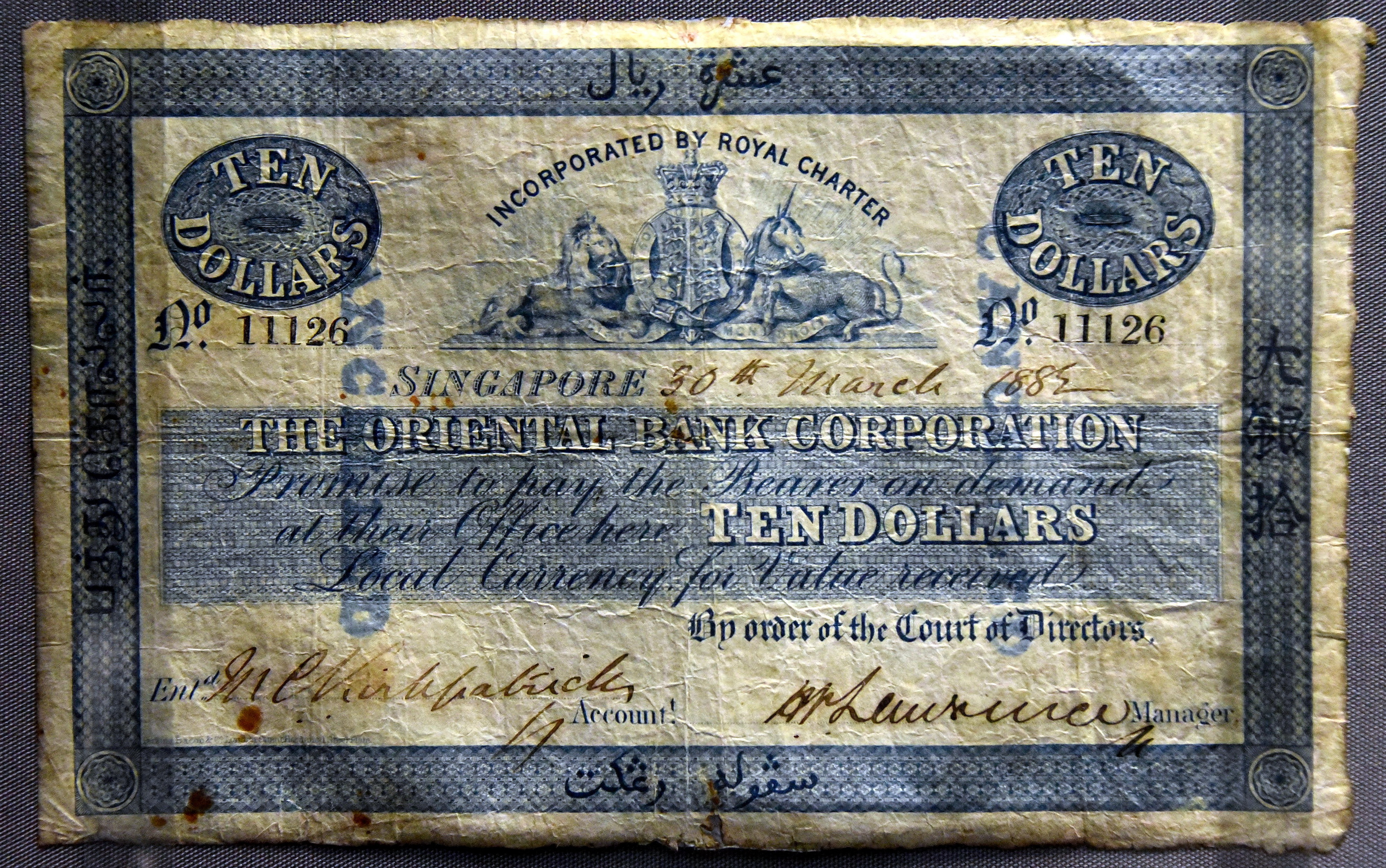
10 dollar note, Oriental Bank Corporation, Singapore, 1885. On display at the British Museum in London

The Spanish-American silver dollar brought over by the Manila galleons was in wide circulation in Asia and the Americas from the 16th to 19th centuries. From 1845 to 1945 the Straits Settlements (of which Singapore used to be part) issued its local equivalent, the Straits dollar. This was replaced by the Malayan dollar, and, from 1953, the Malaya and British Borneo dollar, which were issued by the Board of Commissioners of Currency, Malaya and British Borneo.

Singapore continued to use the common currency upon joining Malaysia in 1963 and after Singapore's independence from Malaysia in 1965, but the formal monetary union between Malaysia, Singapore and Brunei stopped in 1967, and Singapore established the Board of Commissioners of Currency, Singapore (BCCS), on 7 April 1967 and issued its first coins and notes. Nevertheless, the Singapore dollar was exchangeable at par with the Malaysian ringgit until 8 May 1973 under the Interchangeability Agreement, and interchangeability with the Brunei dollar is still maintained.

Initially, the Singapore dollar was pegged to the pound sterling at a rate of two shillings and four pence to the dollar, or £1 = S$60/7 or S$8.57; in turn, £1 = US$2.80 from 1949 to 1967 so that US$1 = S$3.06. This peg to sterling was broken in 1967 when the pound was devalued to US$2.40 but the peg to the U.S. dollar of US$1 = S$3.06 was retained. This peg remained for a short time after the Nixon Shock of the early 1970s. As Singapore's economy grew and its trade links diversified to many other countries and regions, Singapore moved towards pegging its currency against a fixed and undisclosed trade-weighted basket of currencies from 1973 to 1985.

Before 1970, the various monetary functions associated with a central bank were performed by several government departments and agencies. As Singapore progressed, the demands of an increasingly complex banking and monetary environment necessitated streamlining the functions to facilitate the development of a more dynamic and coherent policy on monetary matters. Therefore, the Parliament of Singapore passed the Monetary Authority of Singapore Act in 1970, leading to the formation of MAS on 1 January 1971. The MAS Act gave the MAS the authority to regulate all elements of monetary, banking, and financial aspects of Singapore.

From 1985 onwards, Singapore adopted a more market-oriented exchange regime, classified as a Monitoring Band, in which the Singapore dollar is allowed to float (within an undisclosed bandwidth of a central parity) but closely monitored by the Monetary Authority of Singapore (MAS) against a concealed basket of currencies of Singapore's major trading partners and competitors. This, in theory, allows the Singaporean government to have more control over imported inflation and to ensure that Singapore's exports remain competitive.

On 1 October 2002, the Board of Commissioners of Currency, Singapore (BCCS) merged with the Monetary Authority of Singapore (MAS), which took over the responsibility of banknote issuance.

== Currency in circulation ==
As of 2024, the total currency in circulation was S$66.553 billion. All issued Singapore currency in circulation (notes and coins) is fully backed by external assets in its Currency Fund to maintain public confidence. Such external assets consist of all or any of the following:

- (a) gold and silver in any form;
- (b) foreign exchange in the form of demand or time deposits; bank balances and money at call; Treasury Bills; notes or coins;
- (c) securities of or guaranteed by foreign governments or international financial institutions;
- (d) equities;
- (e) corporate bonds;
- (f) currency and financial futures;
- (g) any other asset which the Authority, with the approval of the President of Singapore, considers suitable for inclusion.

In 2017, the government, in the second reading of the Monetary Authority of Singapore (Amendment) Bill 2017, announced that the Currency Fund will be merged with other funds of the MAS, because the currency in circulation is effectively backed by the full financial strength and assets of MAS, which is much larger than the Currency Fund. As at 31 March 2017, MAS's assets (S$395 billion) were more than seven times larger than the assets of the Currency Fund (S$55 billion). The proposed amendment will merge the Currency Fund with the other funds of MAS and streamline MAS's operations. The Government has said that its support for the currency in circulation, as set out in the Currency Act, remains unchanged.

Singapore's foreign reserves officially stood at over US$288.2 billion, as of July 2022 according to the MAS.

== Coins ==
=== Marine series 1967 ===
In 1967, the first series of coins was introduced in denominations of 1, 5, 10, 20 and 50 cents and 1 dollar. These coins depicted wildlife and other images relating to the island nation and were designed by Stuart Devlin, the same artist credited for the 1966 designs on Australia's decimal coin series. The sizes were the same as those used for the Malaysian ringgit and based directly on the old coinage of the former Malaya and British Borneo dollar. The 1-cent coin was bronze while the other denominations were copper-nickel. Later, in 1976, the 1-cent coin was changed to copper-clad steel. The production of the first series was phased out by 1985.

First Series (Marine Series) (1967–1985)
Value	Technical parameters				Description			Date of issue
Value	Diameter	Thickness	Mass	Composition	Edge	Obverse	Reverse	Date of issue
1 cent	17.78 mm	1.118 mm	1.940 g	Bronze	Plain	A high-rise public housing block with a fountain in front and clouds in the background	Value and Year	12 June 1967
1 cent	17.78 mm	1.118 mm	1.744 g	Copper-clad steel	Plain	A high-rise public housing block with a fountain in front and clouds in the background	Value and Year	1976
5 cents	16.26 mm	1.02 mm	1.410 g	Cupro-nickel	Milled	A snake-bird sitting in its nest and preening its feathers.	Value and Year	12 June 1967
5 cents	16.26 mm	1.02 mm	1.260 g	Cupro-nickel clad steel	Milled	A snake-bird sitting in its nest and preening its feathers.	Value and Year	12 June 1967
5 cents (FAO)	21.23 mm	1.27 mm	1.240 g	Aluminium	Milled	A fish and the phrases "INCREASE PRODUCTION" and "MORE FOOD FROM THE SEA."	Value and Year	1971
10 cents	19.41 mm	1.40 mm	2.83 g	Cupro-nickel	Milled	A seahorse with a stylised piece of seaweed.	Value and Year	12 June 1967
20 cents	23.60 mm	1.78 mm	5.66 g	Cupro-nickel	Milled	A swordfish against a background symbolising water.	Value and Year	12 June 1967
50 cents	27.76 mm	2.03 mm	9.33 g	Cupro-nickel	Milled	A lionfish from tropical waters.	Value and Year	12 June 1967
$1	33.32 mm	2.39 mm	16.85 g	Cupro-nickel	Milled	A stylised Singapore lion symbol flanked by two stalks of paddy.	Value and Year	12 June 1967
For table standards, see the coin specification table.

=== Floral series 1985 ===
In 1985, the second series of coins were introduced in denominations of 1, 5, 10, 20 and 50 cents and 1 dollar. The reverse of these coins were designed by Christopher Ironside. The new series offered smaller coins depicting a floral theme. One-dollar banknotes were discontinued and gradually replaced with an aluminium-bronze coin. The 5-cent coin was also changed to aluminum-bronze while the 10, 20, and 50 cents remained copper-nickel. Limited numbers of commemorative bimetallic 5-dollar coins with scalloped edges were also periodically issued later during this series. This series is still in circulation. The 1 cent coin was taken out of circulation in 2002.

Second Series (Floral Series) (1985–2013)
Value	Technical parameters				Description			Date of issue
Value	Diameter	Thickness	Mass	Composition	Edge	Obverse	Reverse	Date of issue
1 cent	15.90 mm	1.10 mm	1.24 g	Copper-plated zinc	Plain	Coat of Arms, "Singapore" in 4 official languages	Value and Vanda 'Miss Joaquim'	28 September 1987
5 cents	16.75 mm	1.22 mm	1.56 g	Aluminium bronze	Reeded	Coat of Arms, "Singapore" in 4 official languages	Value and Monstera deliciosa	2 December 1985
10 cents	18.50 mm	1.38 mm	2.60 g	Cupronickel	Reeded	Coat of Arms, "Singapore" in 4 official languages	Value and Jasminum multiflorum	2 December 1985
20 cents	21.36 mm	1.72 mm	4.50 g	Cupronickel	Reeded	Coat of Arms, "Singapore" in 4 official languages	Value and Calliandra surinamensis	2 December 1985
50 cents	24.66 mm	2.06 mm	7.29 g	Cupronickel	Reeded	Coat of Arms, "Singapore" in 4 official languages	Value and Allamanda cathartica	2 December 1985
50 cents	24.66 mm	2.06 mm	7.29 g	Cupronickel	Inscribed "Republic of Singapore" and the lion symbol	Coat of Arms, "Singapore" in 4 official languages	Value and Allamanda cathartica	28 May 1990
$1	22.40 mm	2.40 mm	6.30 g	Aluminium bronze	Reeded with inscription: "Republic of Singapore" and the lion symbol	Coat of Arms, "Singapore" in 4 official languages	Value and Lochnera rosea	28 September 1987
For table standards, see the coin specification table.

=== Iconic series (2013) ===
On 21 February 2013, the Monetary Authority of Singapore announced a new series of coins in denominations of 5, 10, 20, 50 cents and 1 dollar, which went into circulation on 25 June 2013, featuring Singapore's national icons and landmarks. The coins are struck on a multi-ply plated-steel planchet used by the Royal Canadian Mint and comes with enhanced features to differentiate from fakes. The coins also feature new designs, the one-dollar, now a bi-metallic coin featuring the Merlion, the fifty cents coin featuring the Port of Singapore, the twenty-cent coin depicts Changi International Airport, the ten-cent coin featuring public housing and the five-cent coin featuring the Esplanade. The second and third series of Singaporean coins have medallic orientation.

Third series – Iconic series (2013–present)
Value	Technical parameters				Description			First issue
Value	Diameter (mm)	Thickness (mm)	Mass (g)	Composition	Edge	Obverse	Reverse	First issue
5 cents	16.75	1.22	1.70	Brass-plated steel	Plain	Coat of arms; lettering: SINGAPURA சிங்கப்பூர் 新加坡 SINGAPORE	Esplanade; value	25 June 2013
10 cents	18.50	1.38	2.36	Nickel-plated steel	Interrupted reeding	Coat of arms; lettering: SINGAPURA சிங்கப்பூர் 新加坡 SINGAPORE	Public housing; value	25 June 2013
20 cents	21.00	1.72	3.85	Nickel-plated steel	Reeded	Coat of arms; lettering: SINGAPURA சிங்கப்பூர் 新加坡 SINGAPORE	Changi Airport; value	25 June 2013
50 cents	23.00	2.45	6.56	Nickel-plated steel	Scalloped	Coat of arms; lettering: SINGAPURA சிங்கப்பூர் 新加坡 SINGAPORE	Port of Singapore; value	25 June 2013
1 dollar	24.65	2.50	7.62	Outer: Brass-plated steel	Reeded	Coat of arms; lettering: SINGAPURA சிங்கப்பூர் 新加坡 SINGAPORE	Merlion; value; Vanda Miss Joaquim laser engraving	25 June 2013
1 dollar	24.65	2.50	7.62	Inner: Nickel-plated steel	Reeded	Coat of arms; lettering: SINGAPURA சிங்கப்பூர் 新加坡 SINGAPORE	Merlion; value; Vanda Miss Joaquim laser engraving	25 June 2013
For table standards, see the coin specification table.

== Banknotes ==
=== Orchid series 1967 ===
The Orchid Series of currency notes is the earliest to be in for circulation in Singapore. Issued in the years 1967 to 1976, it has nine denominations: $1, $5, $10, $25, $50, $100, $500, $1,000, and $10,000.

Each note has an orchid design in the centre of the note's front, the orchid being the national flower of Singapore. A scene of Singapore is depicted on the back, which varies across denominations. Standard on each note, is the Coat of Arms, a lion head watermark, and the signature of the Minister for Finance and chairman of the BCCS, on the front of the note. As an added security feature, all notes have at least one vertically embedded security thread, while the $10,000 note has two.

1st Series – Orchid Series (1967–1976)
Image		Value	Dimensions	Main Colour	Description			Date of issue	Issue suspended	Date of withdrawal	Printer
Obverse	Reverse	Value	Dimensions	Main Colour	Obverse	Reverse	Watermark	Date of issue	Issue suspended	Date of withdrawal	Printer
		$1	121 mm × 64 mm	Dark blue	Vanda Janet Kaneali	Blocks of flats in a housing estate	Lion's head	12 June 1967	6 August 1976	Limited	BWC
		$5	127 mm × 71 mm	Green	Vanda T.M.A.	A busy scene on the Singapore River	Lion's head	12 June 1967	6 August 1976	Limited	BWC
		$10	133 mm × 79 mm	Red	Dendrobium Marjorie Ho "Tony Pek"	4 clasped hands on a background of a map of Singapore	Lion's head	12 June 1967	6 August 1976	Limited	TDLR
		$25	140 mm × 79 mm	Brown	Renanthopsis Aurora	Supreme Court Building	Lion's head	7 August 1972	6 August 1979	Limited	TDLR
		$50	146 mm × 87 mm	Blue	Vanda Rothscildiana "Teo Choo Hong"	Clifford Pier	Lion's head	12 June 1967	6 August 1976	Limited	TDLR
		$100	159 mm × 95 mm	Mid-blue and mauve	Cattleya	A peaceful scene along the Singapore Waterfront	Lion's head	12 June 1967	1 February 1977	Limited	BWC
		$500	160 mm × 96 mm	Green	Dendrobium Shangri-La	Government Office at Saint Andrew's Road	Lion's head	7 August 1972	1 February 1977	Limited	TDLR
		$1,000	159 mm × 95 mm	Mauve and dark grey	Dendrobium Kimiyo Kondo "Chay"	Victoria Theatre & Empress Place	Lion's head	12 June 1967	7 August 1978	Limited	TDLR
		$10,000	203 mm × 133 mm	Green	Aranda Majulah	The Istana	Lion's head	29 January 1973	1 February 1980	Limited	TDLR
For table standards, see the banknote specification table.

=== Bird series 1976 ===
The Bird Series of currency notes is the second set of notes to be issued for circulation in Singapore. Issued in the years 1976 to 1984, it has nine denominations, the same number as in the Orchid Series, albeit the $25 note was replaced by the $20 note.

Each note features a bird on the left side of the note's front, a theme selected to represent a young Singapore "ever ready to take flight to greater heights". Standard on each note, is the Coat of Arms, a lion head watermark, and the signature of the Minister for Finance and chairman of the BCCS, on the front of the note. As an added security feature, all notes have a vertically embedded security thread, while the $1,000 and $10,000 notes have two.

2nd Series – Bird Series (1976–1984)
Image		Value	Dimensions	Main Colour	Description			Date of issue	Issue suspended	Date of withdrawal
Obverse	Reverse	Value	Dimensions	Main Colour	Obverse	Reverse	Watermark	Date of issue	Issue suspended	Date of withdrawal
		$1	125 mm × 63 mm	Blue	Black-naped Tern	National Day Parade	Lion's head	6 August 1976	12 January 1987	Limited
		$5	133 mm × 66 mm	Green	Red-whiskered Bulbul	Cable cars and aerial view of the harbour	Lion's head	6 August 1976	21 August 1989	Limited
		$10	141 mm × 69 mm	Red	White-collared Kingfisher	Garden city with high rise public housing in background	Lion's head	6 August 1976	1 March 1988	Limited
		$20	149 mm × 72 mm	Brown	Yellow-breasted Sunbird	Singapore Changi International Airport with the Concorde in the foreground	Lion's head	6 August 1979	1 January 1991	Limited
		$50	157 mm × 75 mm	Blue	White-rumped Shama	School band on parade	Lion's head	6 August 1976	9 March 1987	Limited
		$100	165 mm × 78 mm	Blue	Blue-throated Bee-eater	Dancers of various ethnic groups	Lion's head	1 February 1977	1 August 1985	Limited
		$500	181 mm × 84 mm	Green	Black-naped Oriole	Oil Refinery	Lion's head	1 February 1977	1 March 1988	Limited
		$1,000	197 mm × 90 mm	Purple	Brahminy Kite	Container terminal	Lion's head	7 August 1978	22 October 1984	Limited
		$10,000	203 mm × 133 mm	Green	White-bellied sea-eagle	2 scenes of the Singapore River	Lion's head	1 February 1980	21 August 1989	Limited
For table standards, see the banknote specification table.

=== Ship series (1984–1991) ===
The Ship Series of currency notes is the third set of notes to be issued for circulation in Singapore. Issued in the years 1984 to 1999, it retains the number of denominations as was in the previous two series of notes, but switches the $20 note for the $2 one.

A maritime theme to reflect Singapore's maritime heritage was adopted, and progressively shows across the various denominations, the different kinds of ships which have plied Singapore's waters as the country developed. These vignettes are located on the front of the note. On the back, various scenes depicting Singapore's achievements are shown, as well as an orchid, to symbolise the country's national flower.

Standard on each note, is the Coat of Arms, a lion head watermark, and the signature of the Minister for Finance and chairman of the BCCS, on the front of the note. As an added security feature, all notes have a vertically embedded security thread.

Third series – Ship series (1984–1999)
Image		Value	Dimensions (mm)	Main colour	Description		Issued from	Issue suspended
Obverse	Reverse	Value	Dimensions (mm)	Main colour	Obverse	Reverse	Issued from	Issue suspended
		$1	125 × 63	Blue	Sha Chuan (junk ship)	Sentosa Satellite Earth Station	12 January 1987	9 September 1999
		$2	133 × 63	Red	Tongkang (barge vessel)	Chingay procession	28 January 1991	9 September 1999
		$2	133 × 63	Purple	Tongkang (barge vessel)	Chingay procession	16 December 1991	9 September 1999
		$5	133 x 66	Green	Twakow (lighter vessel)	PSA container terminal	21 August 1989	9 September 1999
		$10	141 × 69	Red	Palari (barter trading vessel)	Public housing	1 March 1988	9 September 1999
		$50	156 × 74	Navy blue	Perak (coaster vessel)	Benjamin Sheares Bridge	9 March 1987	9 September 1999
		$100	165 × 78	Brown	Chusan (passenger liner)	Changi International Airport; Singapore Airlines Boeing 747	1 August 1985	9 September 1999
		$500	175 × 83	Lime green	Neptune Sardonyx (general cargo vessel)	Armed Forces and Civil Defence Force members	1 March 1988	9 September 1999
		$1,000	185 × 88	Purple	Neptune Garnet (container ship)	Shipyard	22 October 1984	9 September 1999
		$10,000	195 × 93	Red	Neptune Canopus (general bulk carrier)	National Day parade (1987)	21 August 1989	9 September 1999
For table standards, see the banknote specification table.

=== Portrait series (1999) ===
The current Portrait series was introduced in 1999, with the one- and 500-dollar denominations omitted. These notes feature the face of Yusof bin Ishak, the first president of the Republic of Singapore, on the obverse, and the reverse depicts a feature of civic virtue. There are both paper and polymer notes in circulation. The designs of the polymer notes are very similar to the corresponding paper note except for the slightly slippery feel and a small transparent window design in the corner of the banknote. Polymer notes are progressively replacing the paper banknotes in circulation. The notes also have Braille patterns at the top right-hand corner of the front design.

Fourth series – Portrait series (1999–present)
Image		Value	Dimensions (mm)	Substrate	Main colour	Description		Issued from	Issue suspended
Obverse	Reverse	Value	Dimensions (mm)	Substrate	Main colour	Obverse	Reverse	Issued from	Issue suspended
		$2	126 × 63	Paper	Violet	Yusof bin Ishak; Money cowrie	Education	9 September 1999	12 January 2006
		$2	126 × 63	Polymer	Violet	Yusof bin Ishak; Money cowrie	Education	12 January 2006	Current
		$5	133 × 66	Paper	Green	Yusof bin Ishak; Gold ring cowrie	Garden City	9 September 1999	18 May 2007
		$5	133 × 66	Polymer	Green	Yusof bin Ishak; Gold ring cowrie	Garden City	18 May 2007	Current
		$10	141 × 69	Paper	Red	Yusof bin Ishak; Wandering cowrie	Sports	9 September 1999	4 May 2004
		$10	141 × 69	Polymer	Red	Yusof bin Ishak; Wandering cowrie	Sports	4 May 2004	Current
		$50	156 × 74	Paper	Blue	Yusof bin Ishak; Cylindrical cowrie	Arts	9 September 1999	Current
		$100	162 × 77	Paper	Orange	Yusof bin Ishak; Swallow cowrie	Youth	9 September 1999	Current
		$1,000	170 × 83	Paper	Purple	Yusof bin Ishak; Beautiful cowrie	Government	9 September 1999	1 January 2021
		$10,000	180 × 90	Paper	Brown	Yusof bin Ishak; Onyx cowrie	Economics	9 September 1999	1 October 2014
For table standards, see the banknote specification table.

The S$10,000 and B$10,000 note are the world's most valuable banknotes (that are officially in circulation). As of August 2011, it is worth over seven times as much as the next most valuable, the 1,000-Swiss franc note. On 2 July 2014, the Monetary Authority of Singapore announced that it would stop printing $10,000 notes starting from 1 October 2014 to reduce the risk of money laundering, with all banks instructed to exchange the notes with MAS and not recirculate them. This is a trend in many countries like European Central Bank's discontinuation of the 500-euro banknote in 2016 and the Monetary Authority of Brunei Darussalam's announcement to stop the production and issuance of the B$10,000 (the largest banknote) in 2020 amid the COVID-19 pandemic. MAS would also stop producing the S$1,000 banknote as well from 1 January 2021 onwards, but banks would be allowed to recirculate existing notes with customers. The MAS said that the higher denomination notes (beyond $100) will continue to remain legal tender.

=== Commemorative banknotes ===
Commemorative banknotes are also released, usually in limited quantities. The first commemorative banknote was released on 24 July 1990 to celebrate the 25th anniversary of Singapore's independence. Of the 5.1 million $50 polymer banknotes issued, 300,000 came with an overprint of the anniversary date "9 August 1990". This $50 note was the first commemorative note issued by the BCCS and was also the first polymer banknote in the history of Singapore's currency. In addition, the $50 note was the first note designed in Singapore by a Singapore artist.

On 8 December 1999, to celebrate the coming 2000 millennium, three million $2 millennium notes were circulated. The note is similar to the $2 portrait series, except that the prefix of the serial number is replaced with a Millennium 2000 logo. These millennium notes are printed on paper as polymer notes had not yet been introduced at the time.

On 27 June 2007, to commemorate 40 years of currency agreement with Brunei, a commemorative S$20 note was launched; the back is identical to the Bruneian $20 note launched simultaneously. A circulation version of the $20 note can be exchanged at banks in Singapore beginning 16 July 2007, limited to two pieces per transaction.

On 18 August 2015, to commemorate Singapore's 50 years of nation-building, the Monetary Authority of Singapore launched a set of six commemorative notes. These commemorative notes comprise five S$10 polymer notes and a S$50 note. The note design's draw inspiration from significant milestones and achievements in Singapore's history, the multiracialism that defines the nation and the values and aspirations that underpin Singapore's progress. The front of both the $50 and $10 notes feature a portrait of Yusof Ishak, Singapore's first president, as in the current Portrait series notes. The $50 note highlights Singapore's history, transformation and future. It shows the late Prime Minister of Singapore, Lee Kuan Yew, shouting "Merdeka!"—the rallying cry of Singapore's independence struggle. The note makes distinctive use of the colour gold, reflecting Singapore's Golden Jubilee. The five $10 notes have a common front design and varying back designs depicting the theme 'Vibrant Nation, Endearing Home'. Each note reflects a value or aspiration that defines the theme: 'Caring Community, Active Citizenry', 'Opportunities for All', 'Safe and Secure', 'Strong Families' and '...regardless of race, language or religion...'.

In 2017, to commemorate the 50th anniversary of its Currency Interchangeability Agreement between Brunei and Singapore, both the Monetary Authority of Brunei Darussalam and the Monetary Authority of Singapore issued $50 polymer banknotes to commemorate that event.

On 5 June 2019, a $20 note commemorating the Singapore Bicentennial was issued.

Singapore commemorative banknotes
Value	Dimensions	Main Colour	Occasion	Description		Date of issue	Material	Ref.
Value	Dimensions	Main Colour	Occasion	Obverse	Reverse	Date of issue	Material	Ref.
$50	156 × 74 mm	Red	25th Anniversary of the Independence of Singapore	Optically variable device shows President Yusof bin Ishak, Singapore Harbour in 1861, four blossoms of the "Vanda Miss Joaquim" orchid, Tanjong Pagar container port and some prominent office buildings	1st Parliament of Singapore held on 8 December 1965 and group of multi-racial Singaporeans in jubilant celebration	24 July 1990	Polymer	
$25	141 × 79 mm	Brown	25th Anniversary of the Monetary Authority of Singapore	Monetary Authority of Singapore Building set against a view of Singapore's financial district and scene of the SIMEX trading floor	Singapore's financial sector skyline	10 May 1996	Paper	
$20	149 × 72 mm	Orange	40 Years of the Currency Interchangeability Agreement	President Yusof bin Ishak and the "Dendrobium Puan Noor Aishah" orchid	The Esplanade, skyline of Singapore's financial district and the Omar Ali Saifuddien Mosque with the Royal Barge and the water village shown	27 June 2007	Polymer	
$50	156 × 74 mm	Gold	SG50: Celebrating Singapore's 50 years of nation-building	President Yusof bin Ishak, Prime Minister Lee Kuan Yew and a group of children of different races and gender	First National Day Parade 1966 and the Punggol New Town	11 August 2015	Polymer	
$10	141 × 69 mm	Red	SG50: Celebrating Singapore's 50 years of nation-building	President Yusof bin Ishak and the "Vanda Miss Joaquim" orchid	"…regardless of race, language or religion…"	11 August 2015	Polymer	
$10	141 × 69 mm	Red	SG50: Celebrating Singapore's 50 years of nation-building	President Yusof bin Ishak and the "Vanda Miss Joaquim" orchid	"Opportunities for All"	11 August 2015	Polymer	
$10	141 × 69 mm	Red	SG50: Celebrating Singapore's 50 years of nation-building	President Yusof bin Ishak and the "Vanda Miss Joaquim" orchid	"Safe and Secure"	11 August 2015	Polymer	
$10	141 × 69 mm	Red	SG50: Celebrating Singapore's 50 years of nation-building	President Yusof bin Ishak and the "Vanda Miss Joaquim" orchid	"Strong Families"	11 August 2015	Polymer	
$10	141 × 69 mm	Red	SG50: Celebrating Singapore's 50 years of nation-building	President Yusof bin Ishak and the "Vanda Miss Joaquim" orchid	"Caring Community, Active Citizenry"	11 August 2015	Polymer	
$50	158 × 75 mm	Gold	50 Years of the Currency Interchangeability Agreement	President Yusof bin Ishak, the "Vanda Miss Joaquim" orchid, the "Simpur" flower and the window security feature showing Brunei Darussalam's Istana Nurul Iman and Singapore's Istana	Military personnel from the Royal Brunei Armed Forces and the Singapore Armed Forces, students from both countries, Brunei Darussalam's Ulu Temburong National Park and Singapore Botanic Gardens	5 July 2017	Polymer	
$20	162 × 77 mm	Beige-Peach	Singapore Bicentennial	President Yusof bin Ishak, National Gallery Singapore (former Supreme Court and City Hall)	Eight pioneering individuals, namely Munshi Abdullah, Henry Nicholas Ridley, Tan Kah Kee, P. Govindasamy Pillai, Teresa Hsu Chih, Alice Pennefather, Adnan Saidi and Ruth Wong Hie King, portrayed against a backdrop of the Singapore River	5 June 2019	Polymer	
These images are to scale at 0.7 pixel per millimetre (18 pixel per inch). For table standards, see the banknote specification table.

== Exchange rates ==
=== Current exchange rates ===
Current SGD exchange rates
From Google Finance:	AUD CAD CHF CNY EUR GBP HKD JPY USD IDR MYR
From Yahoo! Finance:	AUD CAD CHF CNY EUR GBP HKD JPY USD IDR MYR
From XE.com:	AUD CAD CHF CNY EUR GBP HKD JPY USD IDR MYR
From OANDA:	AUD CAD CHF CNY EUR GBP HKD JPY USD IDR MYR

Most traded currencies by value Currency distribution of global foreign exchange market turnover
Currency	ISO 4217 code	Proportion of daily volume		Change (2022–2025)
Currency	ISO 4217 code	April 2022	April 2025	Change (2022–2025)
United States dollar	USD	88.4%	89.2%	▲0.8pp
Euro	EUR	30.6%	28.9%	▼1.7pp
Japanese yen	JPY	16.7%	16.8%	▲0.1pp
Pound sterling	GBP	12.9%	10.2%	▼2.7pp
Renminbi	CNY	7.0%	8.5%	▲1.5pp
Swiss franc	CHF	5.2%	6.4%	▲1.2pp
Australian dollar	AUD	6.4%	6.1%	▼0.3pp
Canadian dollar	CAD	6.2%	5.8%	▼0.4pp
Hong Kong dollar	HKD	2.6%	3.8%	▲1.2pp
Singapore dollar	SGD	2.4%	2.4%	Steady
Indian rupee	INR	1.6%	1.9%	▲0.3pp
South Korean won	KRW	1.8%	1.8%	Steady
Swedish krona	SEK	2.2%	1.6%	▼0.6pp
Mexican peso	MXN	1.5%	1.6%	▲0.1pp
New Zealand dollar	NZD	1.7%	1.5%	▼0.2pp
Norwegian krone	NOK	1.7%	1.3%	▼0.4pp
New Taiwan dollar	TWD	1.1%	1.2%	▲0.1pp
Brazilian real	BRL	0.9%	0.9%	Steady
South African rand	ZAR	1.0%	0.8%	▼0.2pp
Polish złoty	PLN	0.7%	0.8%	▲0.1pp
Danish krone	DKK	0.7%	0.7%	Steady
Indonesian rupiah	IDR	0.4%	0.7%	▲0.3pp
Turkish lira	TRY	0.4%	0.5%	▲0.1pp
Thai baht	THB	0.4%	0.5%	▲0.1pp
Israeli new shekel	ILS	0.4%	0.4%	Steady
Hungarian forint	HUF	0.3%	0.4%	▲0.1pp
Czech koruna	CZK	0.4%	0.4%	Steady
Chilean peso	CLP	0.3%	0.3%	Steady
Philippine peso	PHP	0.2%	0.2%	Steady
Colombian peso	COP	0.2%	0.2%	Steady
Malaysian ringgit	MYR	0.2%	0.2%	Steady
UAE dirham	AED	0.4%	0.1%	▼0.3pp
Saudi riyal	SAR	0.2%	0.1%	▼0.1pp
Romanian leu	RON	0.1%	0.1%	Steady
Peruvian sol	PEN	0.1%	0.1%	Steady
Other currencies		2.6%	3.4%	▲0.8pp
Total (Note: The total sum is 200% because each currency trade is counted twice: once for the currency being bought and once for the currency being sold. The percentages above represent the proportion of all trades involving a given currency, regardless of which side of the transaction it is on.)		200.0%	200.0%	

=== Exchange rates charts ===
JPY/SGD exchange rate since 2013

SGD/EUR exchange rate since 2013

== See also ==
- Economy of Singapore

== Notes ==
Preceded by: Malaya and British Borneo dollar Reason: Independence; Ratio: at par	Currency of Singapore, Brunei; 1967 – Concurrent with: Brunei dollar	Succeeded by: Current
