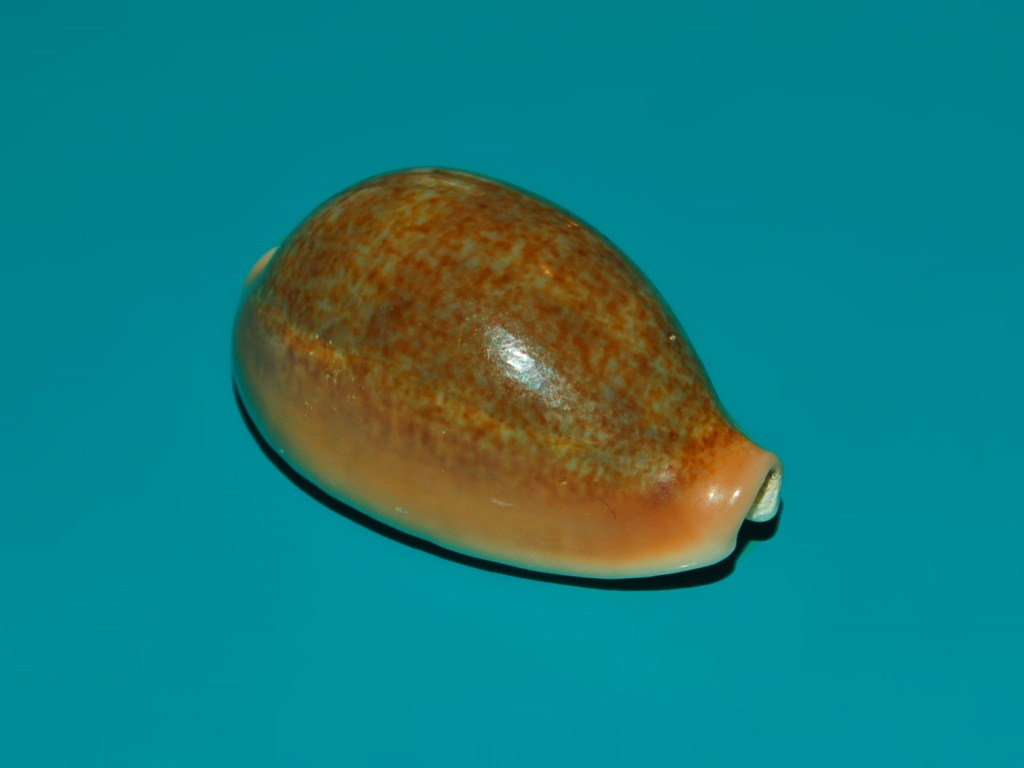
- A shell of Erronea ovum from Solomon Islands, anterior end towards the right

Scientific classification
- Kingdom: Animalia
- Phylum: Mollusca
- Class: Gastropoda
- Subclass: Caenogastropoda
- Order: Littorinimorpha
- Family: Cypraeidae
- Genus: Erronea
- Species: E. ovum

Binomial name
- Erronea ovum Gmelin 1791

Synonyms
- Cypraea ovum Gmelin 1791; Erronea ovum ovum (Gmelin, 1791)· accepted, alternate representation

= Erronea ovum =

Species of gastropod

Erronea ovum, common name the egg cowry, is a species of sea snail, a cowry, a marine gastropod mollusk in the family Cypraeidae, the cowries.

== Description ==
The shells of these quite common cowries reach on average 22–26 millimetres (0.87–1.02 in) of length, with a minimum size of 16 millimetres (0.63 in) and a maximum size of 41 millimetres (1.6 in). The dorsum surface of Erronea ovum is smooth, shiny and generally dark brown, dark olive green or greyish, often with a darker wide trasversal band. They are egg-shaped (hence the Latin name ovum, meaning egg). The base and the margins are usually white or pale brown, with yellowish teeth, but in Erronea ovum chrysostoma the teeth are pink-orange. In the living cowries mantle is greyish, with long tree-shaped sensorial papillae.

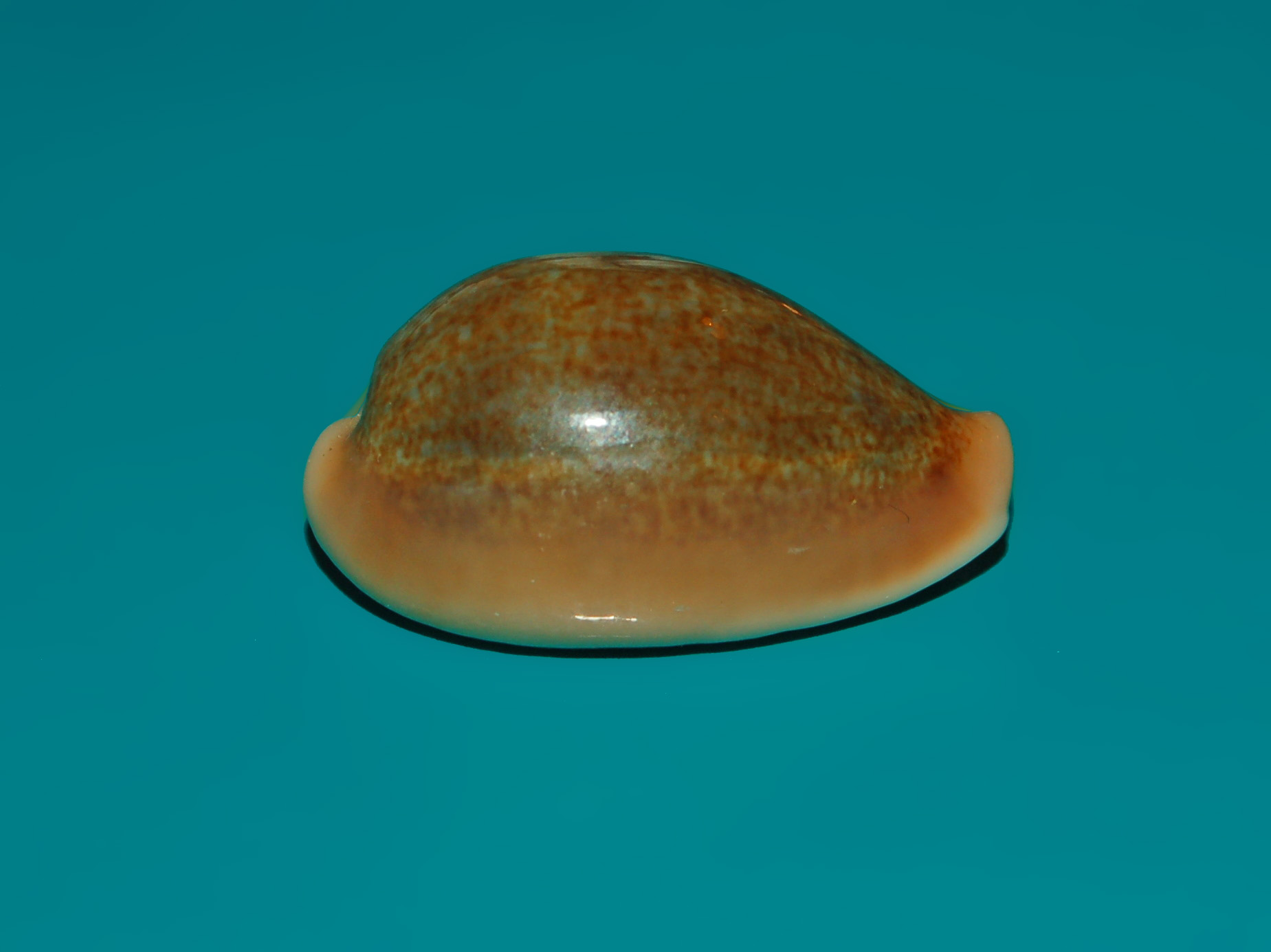
A lateral view of a shell of Erronea ovum from the Solomon Islands, anterior end towards the right

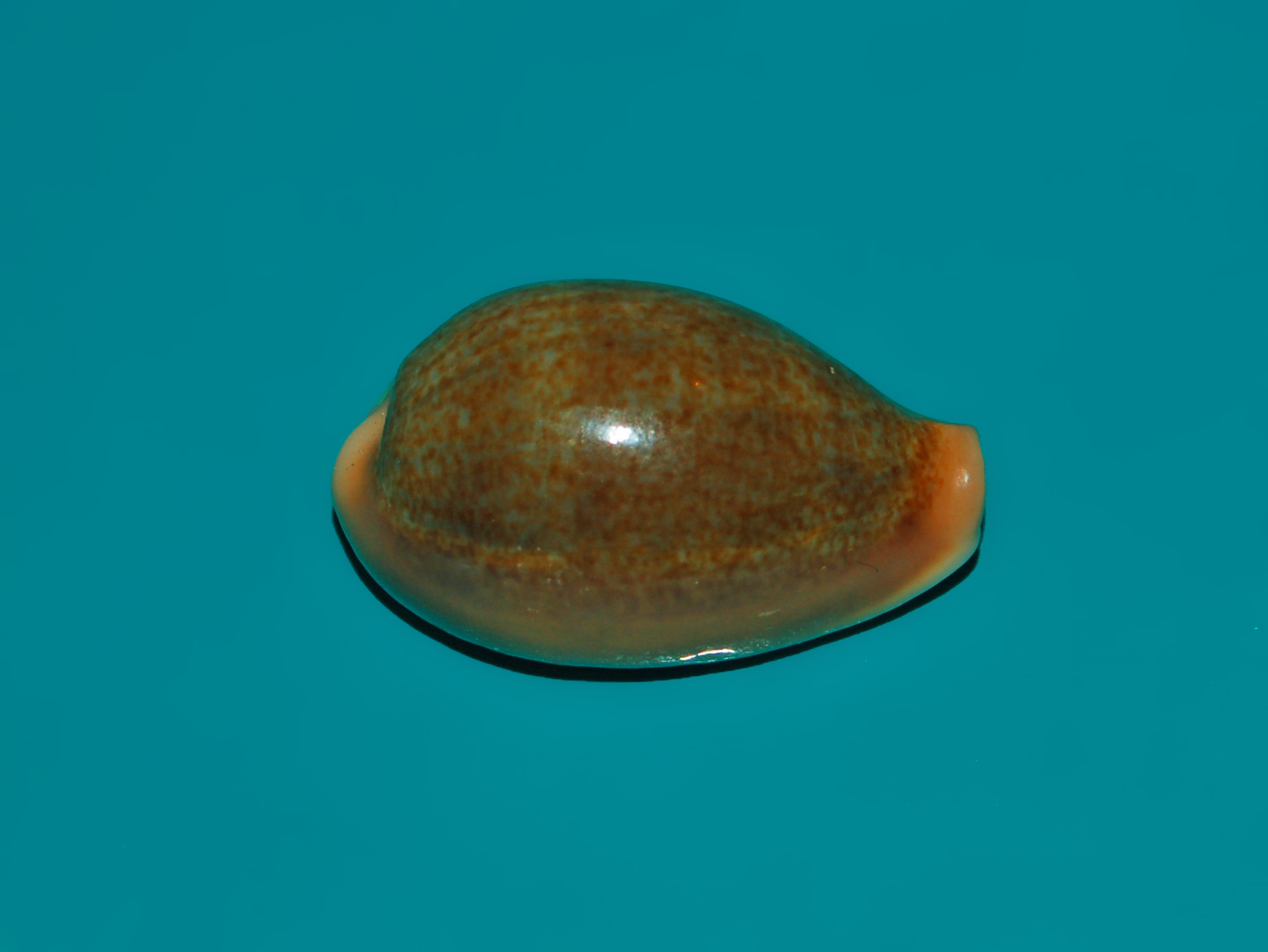
A dorsal view of shells of Erronea ovum from the Solomon Islands, anterior end towards the right

== Distribution ==
This species occurs from Southeast Asia to the Southwest Pacific, along the coasts of Japan, East China, Thailand, Indonesia, Malaysia, Papua-New Guinea, western Australia, Philippines, Palau Islands, Solomon Islands, Micronesia and New Caledonia.

== Habitat ==
Erronea ovum lives in the tropical and subtropical zone, in shallow intertidal water up to 3–10 metres (9.8–32.8 ft) of depth, mainly on coral reefs.

== Subspecies ==
- Erronea ovum chrysostoma (F.A. Schilder, 1927)
- Erronea ovum erici Lorenz, Bridges & Chiapponi, 2011
- Erronea ovum ovum (Gmelin, 1791) : synonym of Erronea ovum (Gmelin, 1791)
- Erronea ovum palauensis (F.A. Schilder & M. Schilder, 1938)
