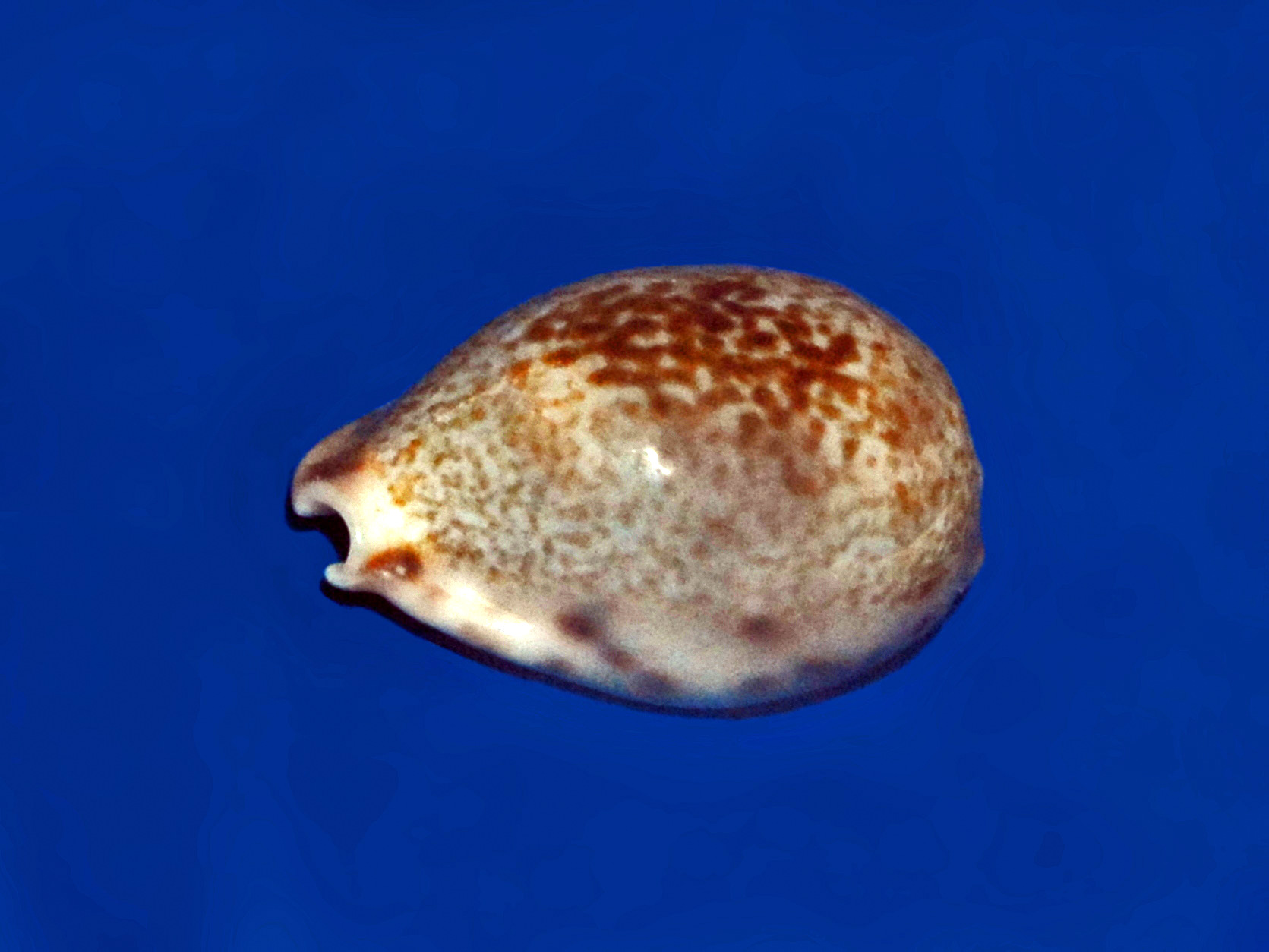
- Shell of Erronea pallida from India at the Museo Civico di Storia Naturale di Milano

Scientific classification
- Kingdom: Animalia
- Phylum: Mollusca
- Class: Gastropoda
- Subclass: Caenogastropoda
- Order: Littorinimorpha
- Family: Cypraeidae
- Genus: Erronea
- Species: E. pallida

Binomial name
- Erronea pallida (Gray, 1824)

Synonyms
- Cypraea pallida Gray, 1824; Erronea gilva Sulliotti, G.R., 1924

= Erronea pallida =

Species of gastropod

Erronea pallida, common name pale cowry, is a species of sea snail, a cowry, a marine gastropod mollusk in the family Cypraeidae, the cowries.

== Description ==
The shell size varies between 13 mm and 34 mm. The dorsum surface is usually pale brown or greyish, with a darker brown area in the middle, while the base is whitish. It can be found under rocks in turbid or muddy waters at intertidal depth.

== Distribution ==
This species is distributed along the Gulf of Oman, the Philippines and in the Indian Ocean along Kenya.
