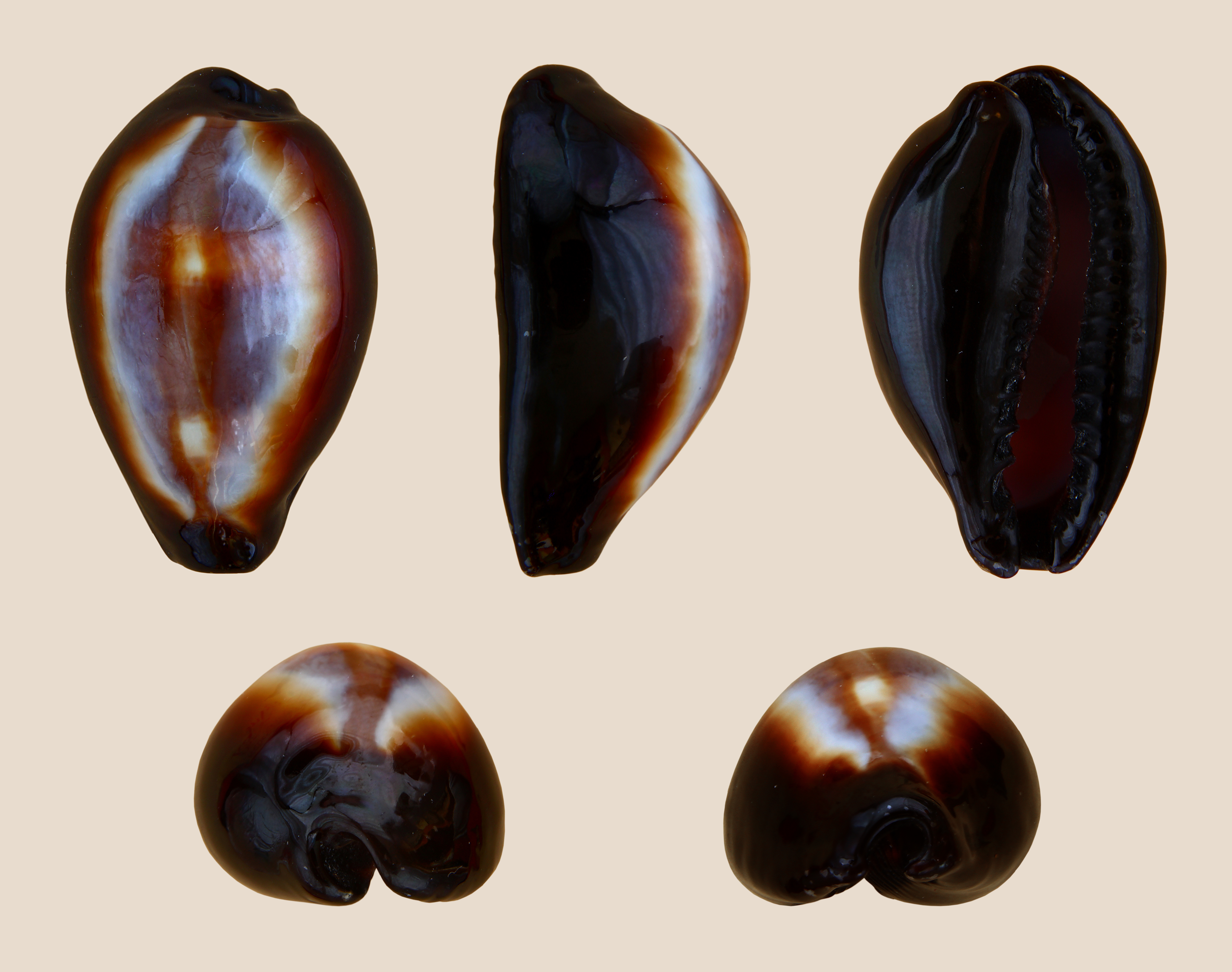
- Five views of a shell of Erronea onyx
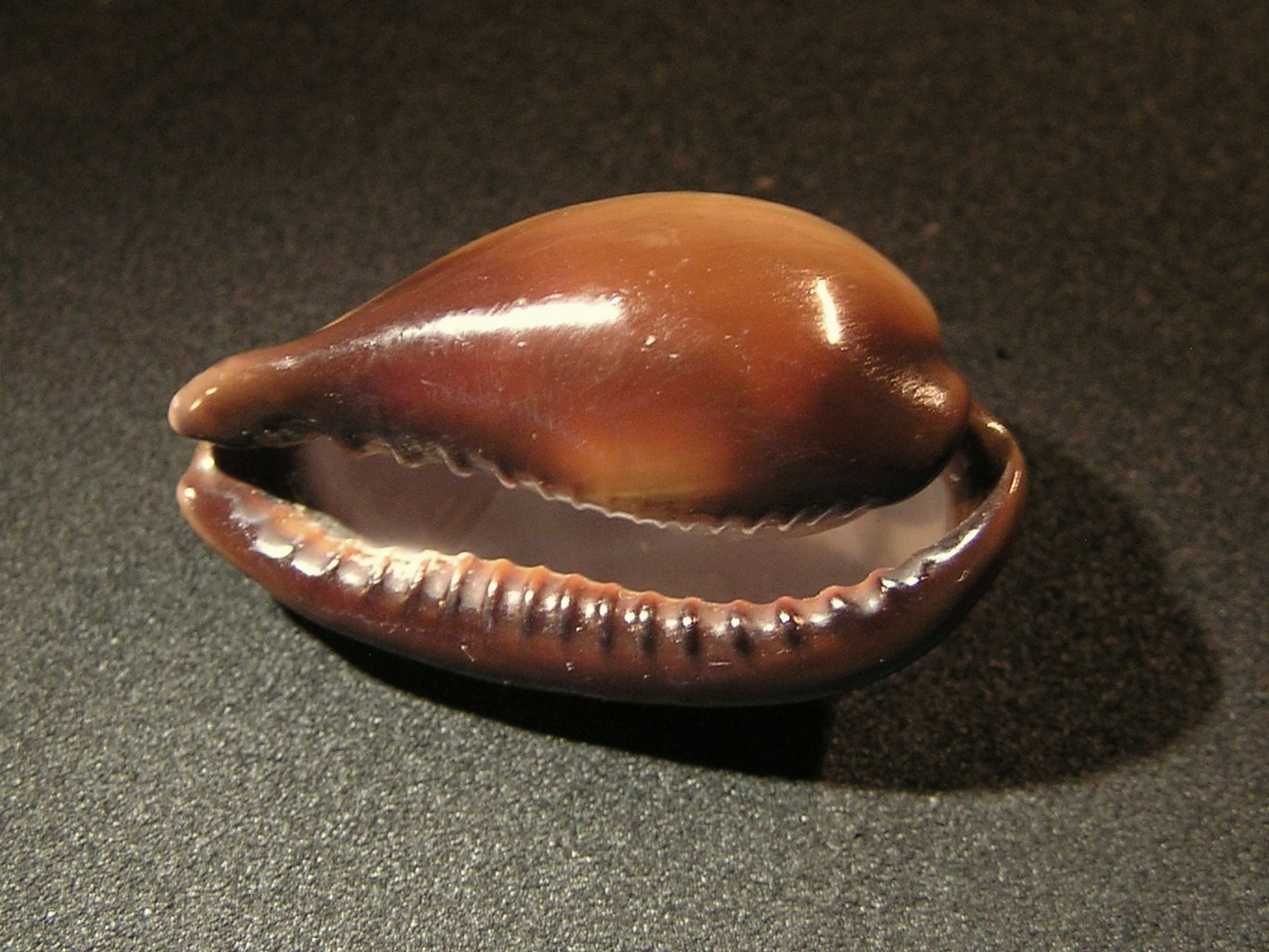
- Apertural view of a shell of Erronea succincta persica

Scientific classification
- Kingdom: Animalia
- Phylum: Mollusca
- Class: Gastropoda
- Subclass: Caenogastropoda
- Order: Littorinimorpha
- Superfamily: Cypraeoidea
- Family: Cypraeidae
- Genus: Erronea; Linnaeus, 1758

Type species
- Cypraea errones Linnaeus, 1758

Synonyms
- Adusta Jousseaume, 1884; Aricia (Erronea) Troschel, 1863 (original rank); Erronea (Adusta) Jousseaume, 1884; Erronea (Gratiadusta) Iredale, 1930; Erronea (Ipserronea) Iredale, 1935; Gratiadusta Iredale, 1930; Ipserronea Iredale, 1935; Palangerosa Iredale, 1930; Palmadusta (Gratiadusta) Iredale, 1930

= Erronea =

Genus of gastropods

Erronea is a genus of sea snails, marine gastropod mollusks in the family Cypraeidae, the cowries.

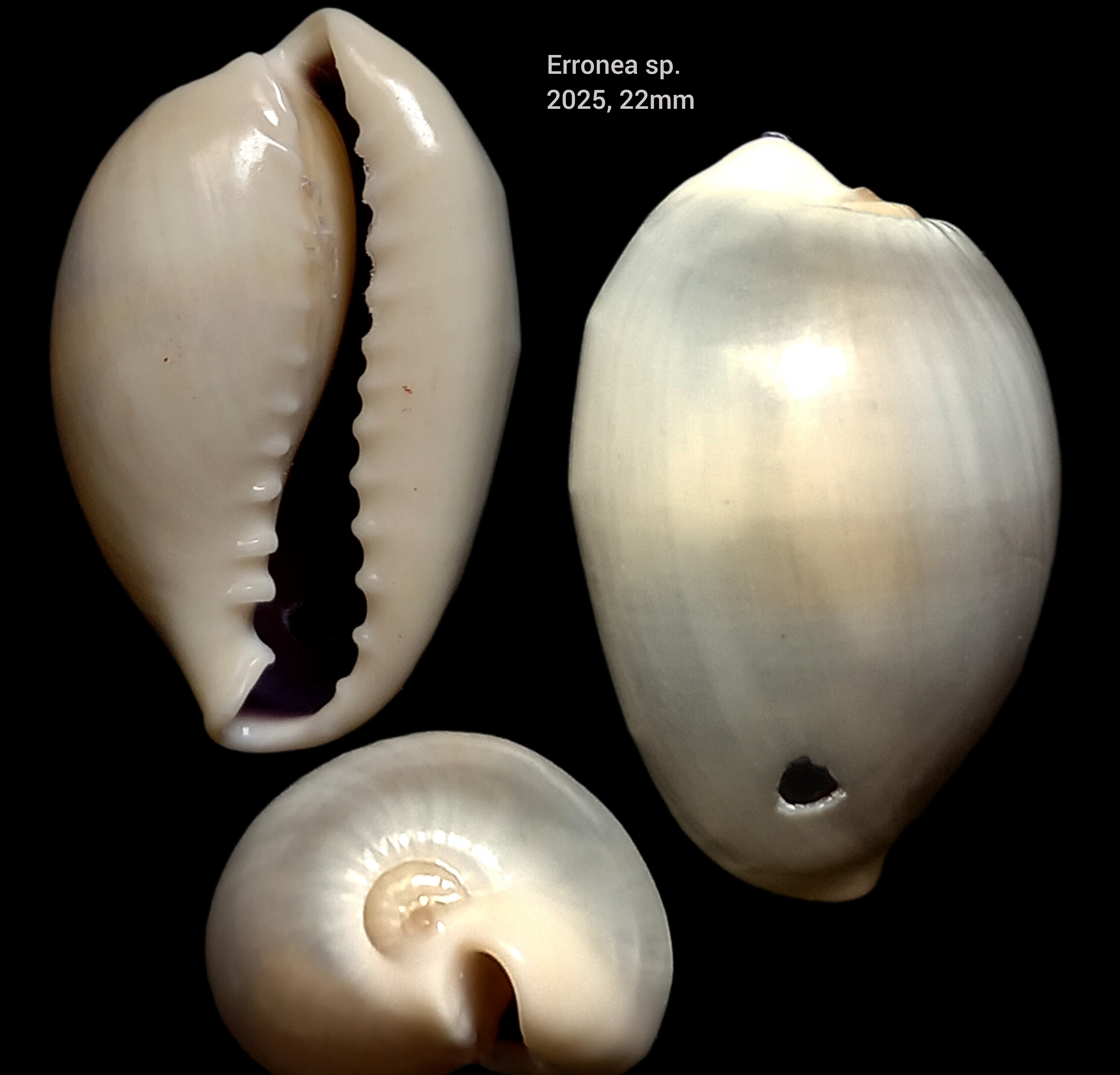
Erronea sp

== Species ==
Species within the genus Erronea include:

- Erronea adusta (Lamarck, 1810)
- Erronea angioyorum Biraghi, 1978
- Erronea caurica (Linnaeus, 1758)
- Erronea cylindrica (Born, 1778)
- Erronea errones (Linnaeus, 1758)
- Erronea fernandoi Cate, 1969
- Erronea garyi Petuch, Berschauer & D. B. Waller, 2019
- Erronea melanesiae F. A. Schilder, 1937
- Erronea nymphae (Jay, 1850)
- Erronea onyx (Linnaeus, 1758)
- Erronea ovum (Gmelin, 1791)
- Erronea pallida (Gray, 1824)
- Erronea pyriformis (Gray, 1824)
- Erronea rabaulensis Schilder, 1964
- Erronea subviridis (Reeve, 1835)
- Erronea vredenburgi Schilder, 1927
- Erronea xanthodon (Gray in Sowerby I, 1832)

Species brought into synonymy

- Erronea angustata (Gmelin, 1791): synonym of Notocypraea angustata (Gmelin, 1791)
- Erronea bealsi Mock, 1996: synonym of Paradusta hungerfordi bealsi (Mock, 1996) (original combination)
- Erronea bregeriana (Crosse, 1868): synonym of Contradusta bregeriana (Crosse, 1868)
- Erronea chinensis (Gmelin, 1791): synonym of Ovatipsa chinensis (Gmelin, 1791)
- Erronea coloba (Melvill, 1888): synonym of Ovatipsa coloba (Melvill, 1888)
- Erronea donghaiensis Ma, 1997: synonym of Paradusta hungerfordi hungerfordi (G. B. Sowerby III, 1888)
- Erronea hungerfordi (Sowerby III, 1888): synonym of Paradusta hungerfordi (G. B. Sowerby III, 1888)
- Erronea japonica Schilder, 1931: synonym of Purpuradusta gracilis notata (Gill, 1858) (synonym)
- Erronea langfordi Kuroda, 1938: synonym of Austrasiatica langfordi (Kuroda, 1938) (original combination)
- Erronea listeri (Gray, 1824): synonym of Melicerona listeri (Gray, 1824)
- Erronea pulchella (Swainson, 1823): synonym of Ficadusta pulchella (Swainson, 1823)
- Erronea succincta (Linnaeus, 1758): synonym of Erronea onyx (Linnaeus, 1758)
- Erronea teramachii Kuroda, 1938: synonym of Nesiocypraea teramachii (Kuroda, 1938) (original combination)
- Erronea walkeri (Sowerby I, 1832): synonym of Contradusta walkeri (G. B. Sowerby I, 1832)
- Erronea weaveri Walls, 1980: synonym of Ficadusta barclayi (Reeve, 1857)

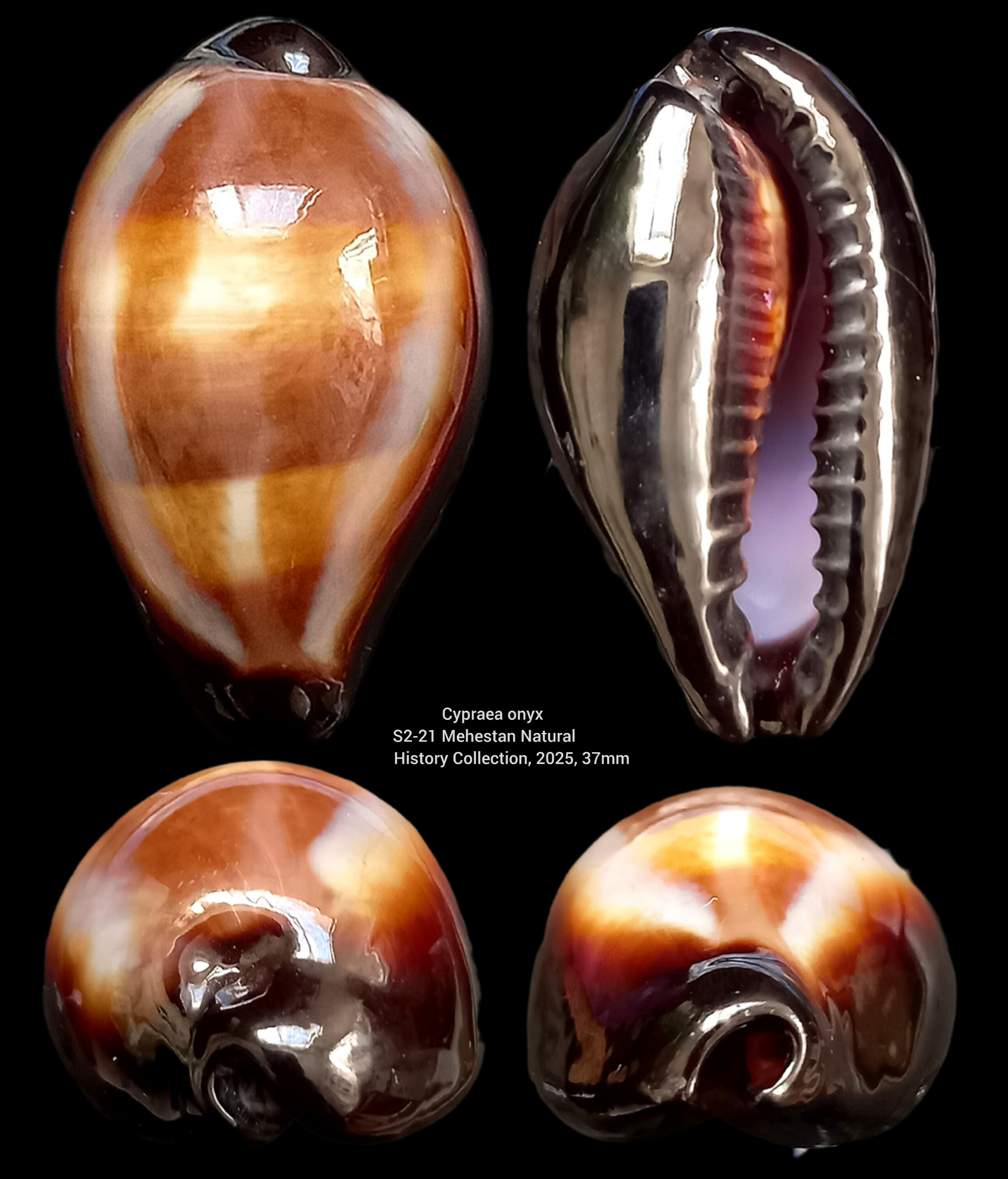
Erronea onyx S2-21 37mm
