= Brunei–Singapore Currency Interchangeability Agreement =

Currency Interchangeability Agreement between Brunei and Singapore

Currency Interchangeability Agreement
- Brunei (in green) and Singapore (in orange) on the world map
- Effective: 12 June 1967; 58 years ago (original); 8 May 1973; 52 years ago (current) (Note: Malaysia withdrew from the agreement on this date.)
- Parties: Brunei; Singapore

The Brunei–Singapore Currency Interchangeability Agreement, formally known as the Currency Interchangeability Agreement, is a bilateral arrangement between Brunei and Singapore that permits the Brunei Dollar and the Singapore Dollar to be exchanged at par value and without any transaction charges. Initially established in 1967 as a trilateral agreement inclusive of Malaysia, the pact facilitated seamless monetary interchangeability among the three nations. However, Malaysia unilaterally withdrew from the agreement in 1973, leaving Brunei and Singapore to uphold the arrangement independently.

Under the terms of the agreement, the Brunei Darussalam Central Bank (BDCB) and the Monetary Authority of Singapore (MAS) are obliged to accept and exchange the other party's issued notes and coins at face value and without fees. This obligation applies solely to the central monetary authorities; commercial entities are not legally compelled to accept the counterpart currency and are thus within their rights to decline it, as the foreign currency is recognised in both jurisdictions only as "customary tender" rather than legal tender. Nonetheless, such refusals are relatively uncommon particularly among larger businesses and institutions where transactions and financial interconnectivity are more routine.

== History ==
In January 1952, the Board of Commissioners of Currency of Malaya and British Borneo was established to act as the sole currency issuing authority for the Federation of Malaya, Singapore, Brunei, North Borneo, and Sarawak. It issued the Malaya and British Borneo dollar for these countries to share and use.

On 31 August 1957, the Federation of Malaya gained independence from Britain, which later Singapore, North Borneo, and Sarawak were allowed to join the federation to form Malaysia in 1963. Malaysia and Brunei continued to use the Malaya and British Borneo dollar still issued by the Board of Commissioners of Currency of Malaya and British Borneo. Singapore was later expelled from union in 1965, with the now independent country continuing to use the same dollar it had been using.

On 12 December 1964, Malaysia decided that it would issue its own currency through Bank Negara Malaysia from 12 December 1966 onwards, meaning that it would withdraw itself from the Board of Commissioners of Currency of Malaya and British Borneo. Malaysia later invited Brunei to accept its currency, which was rejected.

On 12 June 1967, the three countries, Brunei, Malaysia, and Singapore came to agreement of the Currency Interchangeability Agreement, which Brunei and Singapore agreed upon establishing their own currency boards and issue their own currencies, effectively abolishing the Board of Commissioners of Currency of Malaya and British Borneo. A system of free interchangeability of their respective currencies was also agreed upon, which the banks in each country were obliged to accept, at par and without charge, the notes and coins of the other countries. The three countries also agreed to repatriate the currencies of each other's and to receive at par the equivalent in sterling or some other currency agreed upon.

On 8 May 1973, the free interchangeability arrangement between Malaysia and Singapore was terminated by Malaysia unilaterally, with the decision supported by the devaluation of the US dollar against gold and the collapse of the Bretton Woods system of fixed exchange rates, to be later known as the Nixon shock. Brunei later decided to continue with the arrangement with Singapore and terminate its arrangement with Malaysia.

In 2007, the 40th anniversary of the agreement was celebrated by the two countries, with both countries jointly issuing a set of two $20 commemorative polymer notes. The set consisted of one Singapore $20 note and one Brunei Darussalam $20 note, with both notes having matching serial numbers. The 50th anniversary was similarly celebrated in 2017, except with $50 notes being issued.

== Effects ==
Besides from the bilateral trade, investment and tourism that was encouraged between the two countries under the Currency Interchangeability Agreement, strong political cooperation was also fostered.

== See also ==
- Singapore Dollar
- Brunei Dollar
- Malaysian Ringgit
