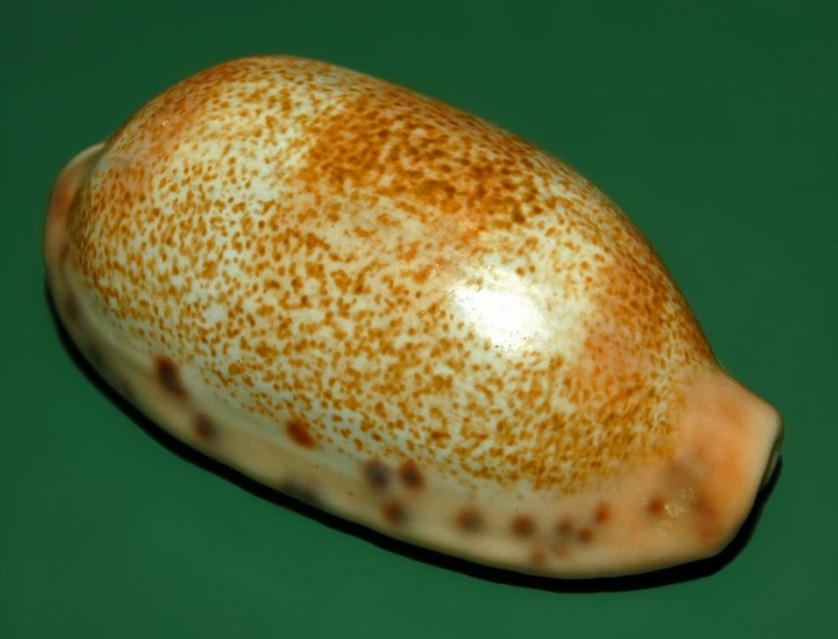
- Erronea caurica, dorsal view

Scientific classification
- Kingdom: Animalia
- Phylum: Mollusca
- Class: Gastropoda
- Subclass: Caenogastropoda
- Order: Littorinimorpha
- Family: Cypraeidae
- Genus: Erronea
- Species: E. caurica

Binomial name
- Erronea caurica (Linnaeus, 1758)

Synonyms
- Cypraea caurica Linnaeus, 1758; Cypraea derosa Gmelin, 1791; Cypraea lurica (misspelling); Erronea caurica corrosa (Gronovius, 1781) (unavailable name); Ovatipsa caurica (Linnaeus, 1758)

= Erronea caurica =

Species of gastropod

Erronea caurica, common name the thick-edged cowry, is a species of sea snail, a cowry, a marine gastropod mollusk in the family Cypraeidae, the cowries.

== Subspecies ==
The following subspecies are recognized :

- Erronea caurica algida Bozzetti, 2018
- Erronea caurica blaesa Iredale, 1939
- Erronea caurica caurica (Linnaeus, 1758)
- Erronea caurica chrismeyeri Lorenz, 2017
- Erronea caurica dracaena (Born, 1778)
- Erronea caurica elongata (Perry, 1811)
- Erronea caurica insolita Bozzetti, 2017
- Erronea caurica mayottensis Vachon & Verneau, 2017 (synonym of Erronea caurica quinquefasciata (Röding, 1798))
- Erronea caurica nabeqensis Heiman & Mienis, 2000
- Erronea caurica quinquefasciata (Röding, 1798)
- Erronea caurica samoensis Lorenz, 2002
- Erronea caurica thachi F. Huber, 2020

== Description ==
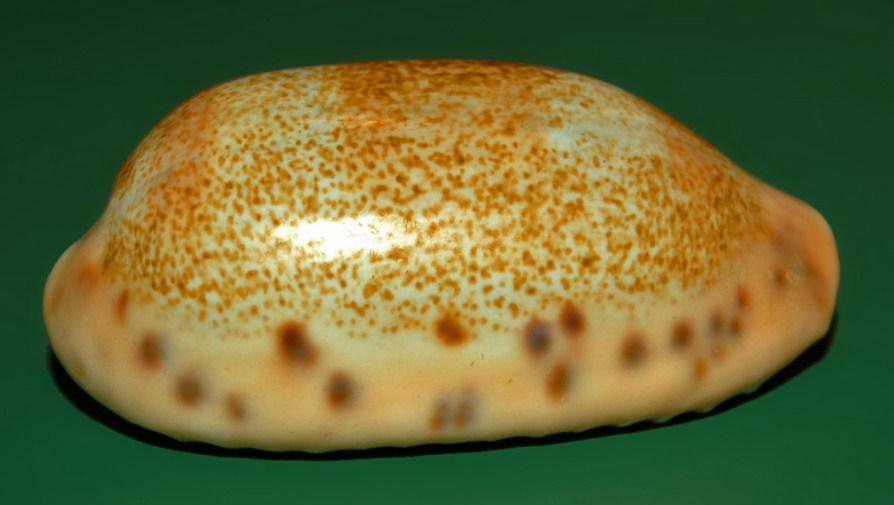
Erronea caurica, side view

These cowries reach 35–55 millimetres (1.4–2.2 in) of length. Their shape is elongated and the basic color is light brown or yellowish, with a pinkish underside and brown spots on the edge.

== Distribution ==
The species and its subspecies are distributed in the Red Sea and in the Indian Ocean along Aldabra, Chagos, the Comores, East Africa, Kenya, Madagascar, the Mascarene Basin, Mauritius, Mozambique, Réunion, the Seychelles, Somalia and Tanzania.
