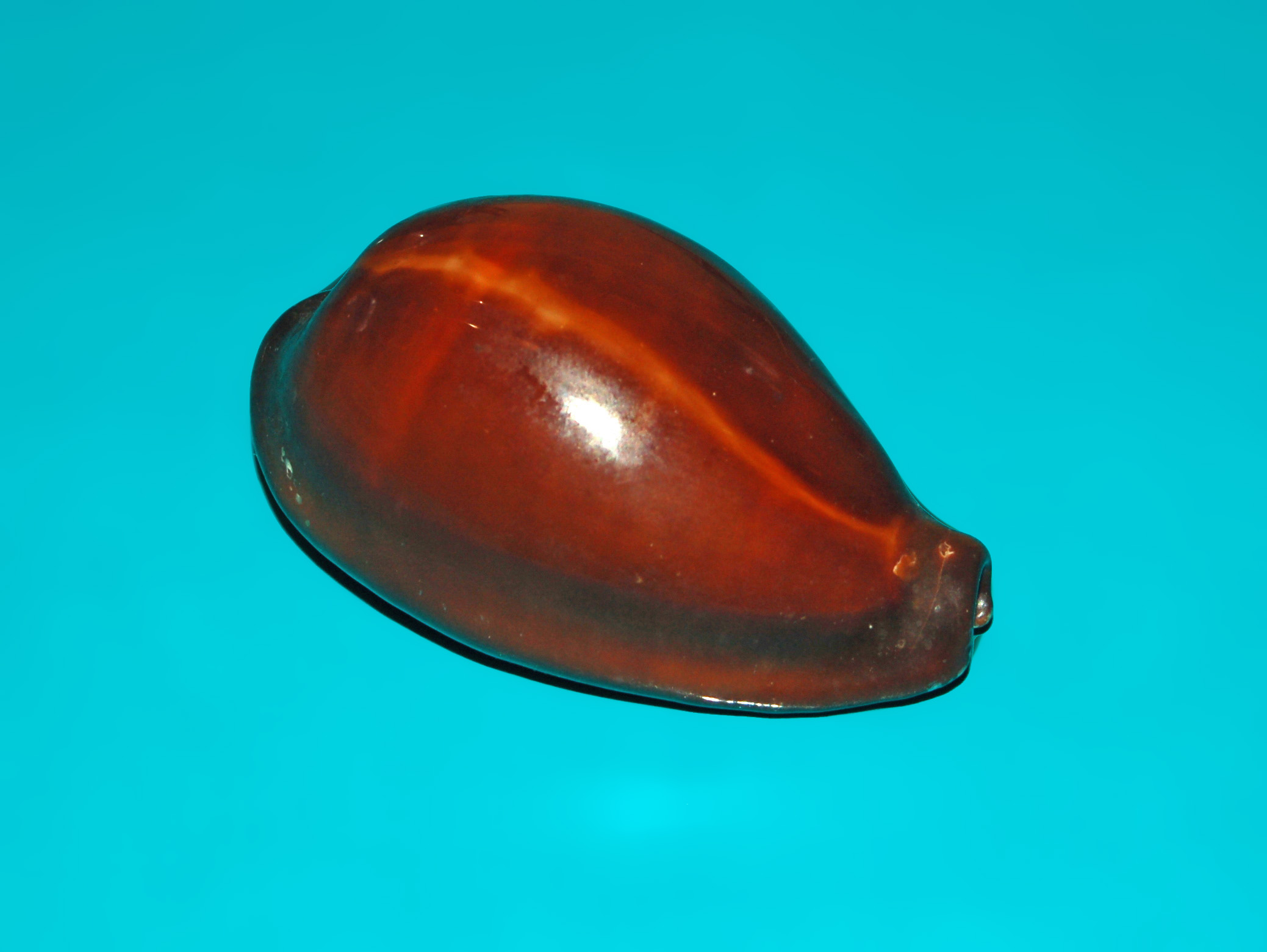
- A shell of Erronea adusta succinta from Zanzibar, anterior end towards the right

Scientific classification
- Kingdom: Animalia
- Phylum: Mollusca
- Class: Gastropoda
- Subclass: Caenogastropoda
- Order: Littorinimorpha
- Family: Cypraeidae
- Genus: Erronea
- Species: E. adusta

Binomial name
- Erronea adusta (Lamarck, 1810)

Synonyms
- Erronea onyx adusta, Lamarck, 1810; Cypraea adusta, Lamarck, 1810; Erronea succincta adusta, (Lamarck, 1810)

= Erronea adusta =

Species of gastropod

Erronea adusta, common name the chocolate beauty or tanned/dark onyx cowry, is a species of sea snail, a cowry, a marine gastropod mollusk in the family Cypraeidae, the cowries. This species was formerly regarded as a subspecies of the onyx cowry (Erronea onyx).

== Description ==
The shells of these cowries reach on average 23–58 millimetres (0.91–2.28 in) in length. The dorsum surface of Erronea adusta is smooth, shiny and generally dark brown. The base is also dark brown, usually with orange teeth. The interior of the shell is pale purple.

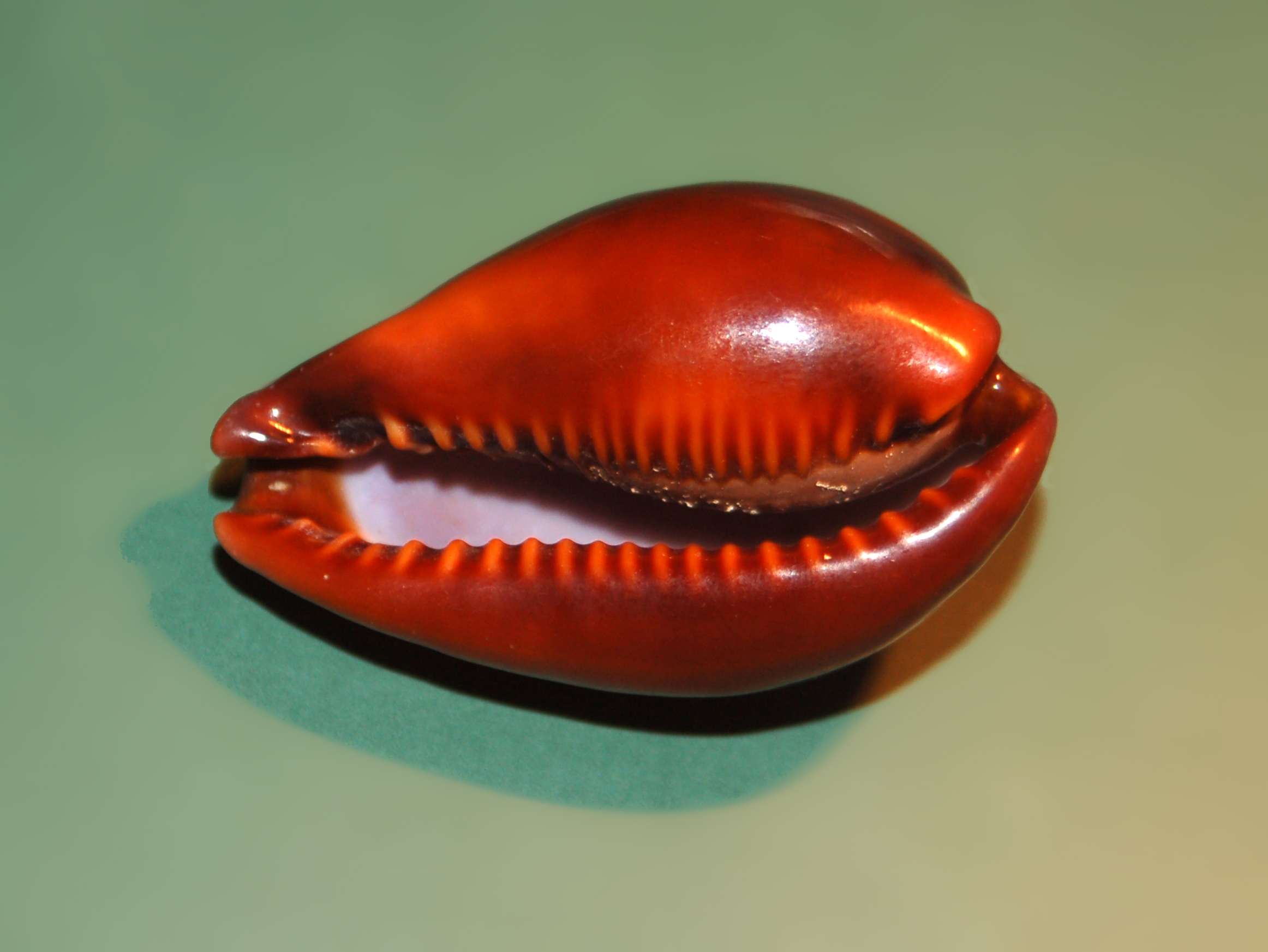
A shell of Erronea adusta succinta from Zanzibar, ventral view, anterior end towards the left

== Distribution ==
This species occurs in the Indian Ocean along East Africa (mainly Kenya, Mascarene, Mauritius and Tanzania).

== Habitat ==
In shallow subtidal water, Erronea adusta lives in the tropical and subtropical zones.
