= Erronea pyriformis =

- A shell of Erronea pyriformis from the Philippines

Scientific classification
- Kingdom: Animalia
- Phylum: Mollusca
- Class: Gastropoda
- Subclass: Caenogastropoda
- Order: Littorinimorpha
- Family: Cypraeidae
- Genus: Erronea
- Species: E. pyriformis

Binomial name
- Erronea pyriformis (Gray, 1824)

Synonyms
- Cypraea pyriformis Gray, 1824

Species of gastropod

Erronea pyriformis, common name the pear-shaped cowrie, is a species of sea snail, a cowry, a marine gastropod mollusk in the family Cypraeidae, the cowries.

== Description ==
The shells of these quite uncommon cowries reach on average 20–25 millimetres (0.79–0.98 in) of length, with a minimum size of 16 millimetres (0.63 in) and a maximum size of 34 millimetres (1.3 in). They are pear-shaped, with a very variable pattern. The surface is smooth and shiny, their basic color is usually whitish or greenish, with many small brown and one or two transversal brown bands or brown patches. The base and the margins are whitish with some brown spots, while the columellar teeth are dark brown. Erronea pyriformis is quite similar to Contradusta pulchella, but the last has longer reddish-brown teeth. In the living cowries mantle and foot are well developed, with external antennae. The lateral flaps of the mantle may hide completely the shell surface and may be quickly retracted into the shell opening.

== Distribution ==
This species occurs from Western Pacific to Indian Ocean, in the sea along India, Sri Lanka, Philippines, Malaysia, Indonesia and Australia.

== Habitat ==
These cowries live in tropical intertidal waters usually up to 5–20 metres (16–66 ft) in depth, and are found under rocks or coral slabs and in caves.
