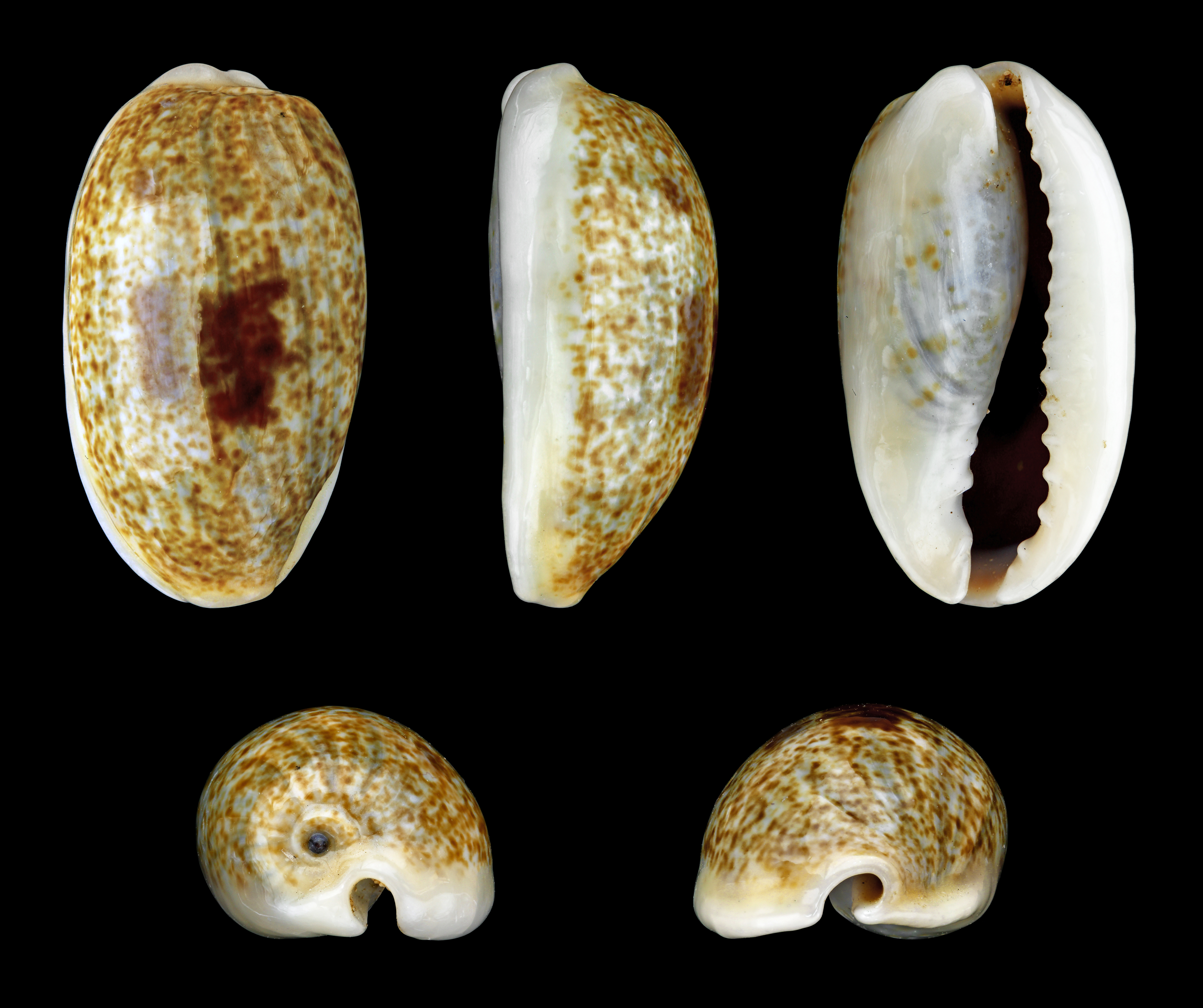

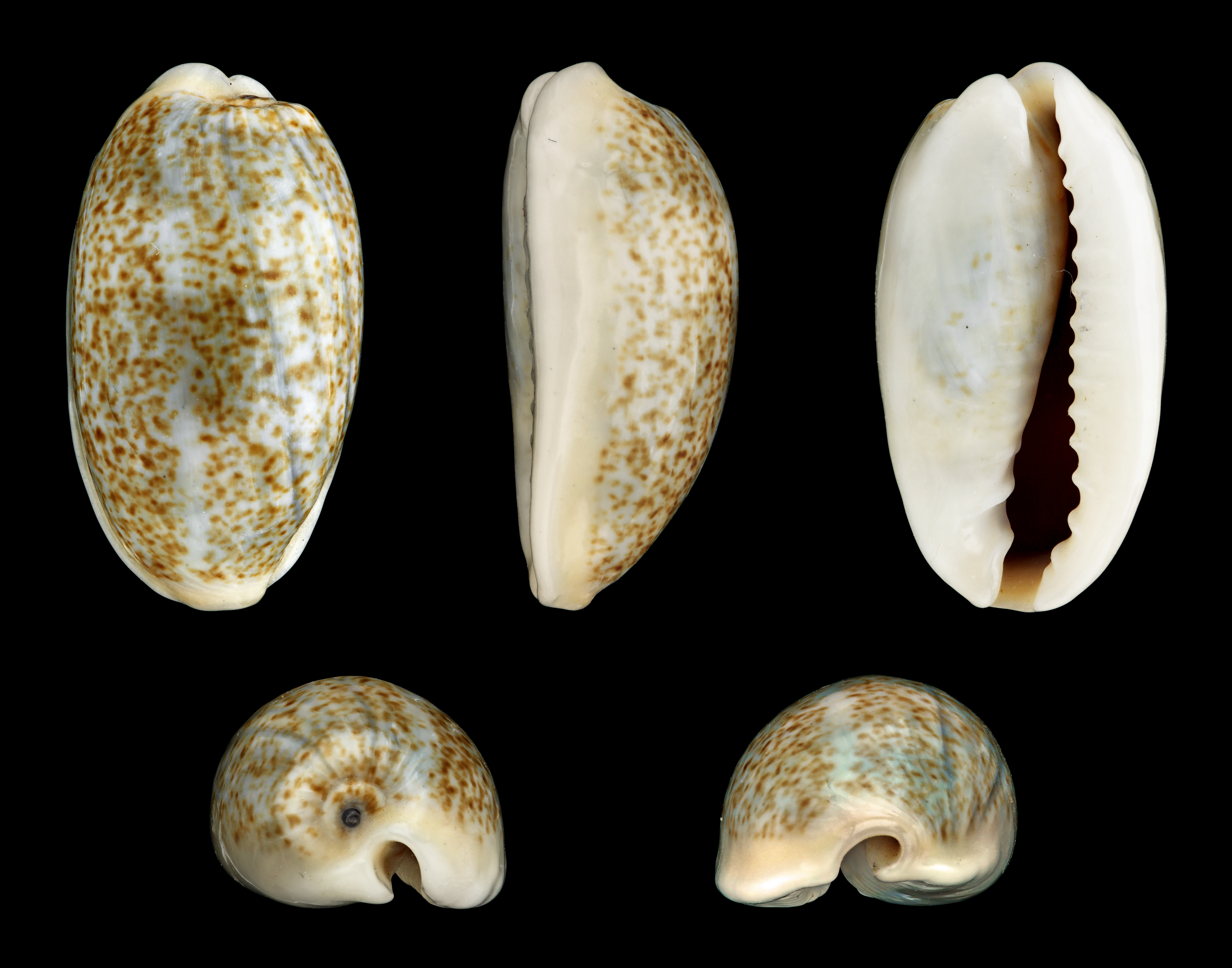
- Two shells of Erronea errones, with and without brown blotch

Scientific classification
- Kingdom: Animalia
- Phylum: Mollusca
- Class: Gastropoda
- Subclass: Caenogastropoda
- Order: Littorinimorpha
- Family: Cypraeidae
- Genus: Erronea
- Species: E. errones

Binomial name
- Erronea errones (Linnaeus, 1758)

= Erronea errones =

Species of gastropod

Erronea errones, the wandering cowry or erroneous cowry, is a species of sea snail, a cowry, a marine gastropod mollusk in the family Cypraeidae, the cowries.

== Description ==
These very common shells reach on average 20–28 millimetres (0.79–1.10 in) of length, with a maximum size of 45 millimetres (1.8 in) and a minimum size of 13 millimetres (0.51 in). The dorsum is usually pale brown or greenish, with very variable patterns of darker greenish trasversal bands or spots. The base and the teeth of the aperture are white. In the living cowries the papillose greenish mantle grants the camouflage.

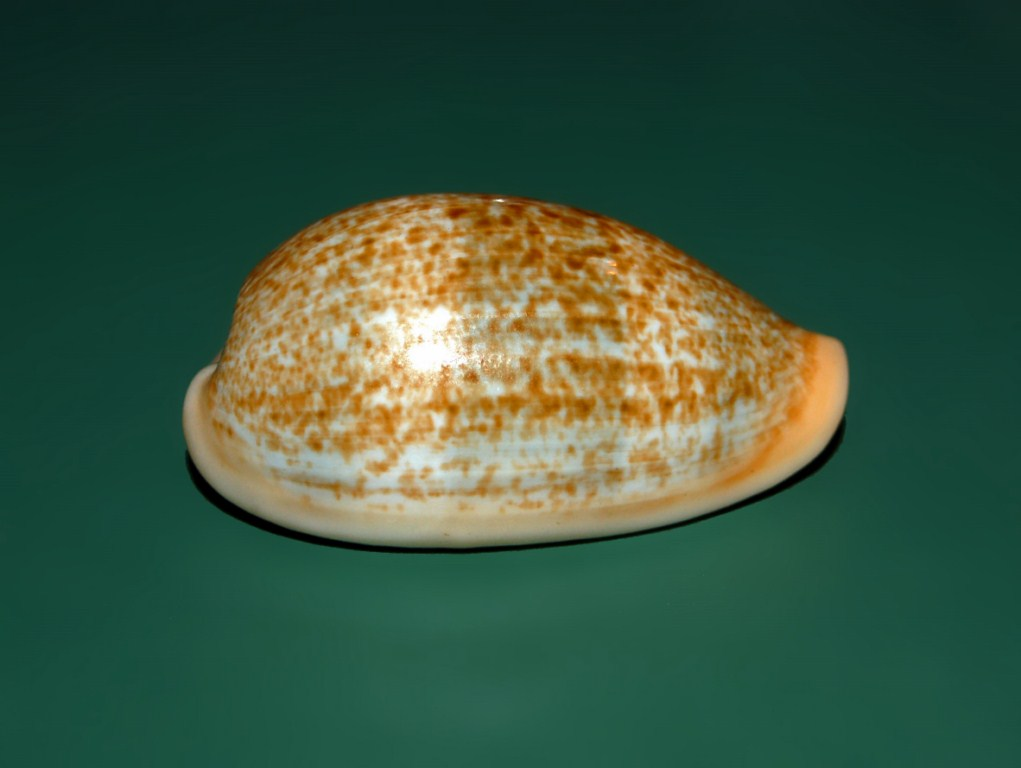
Erronea errones, side view, anterior end towards the right

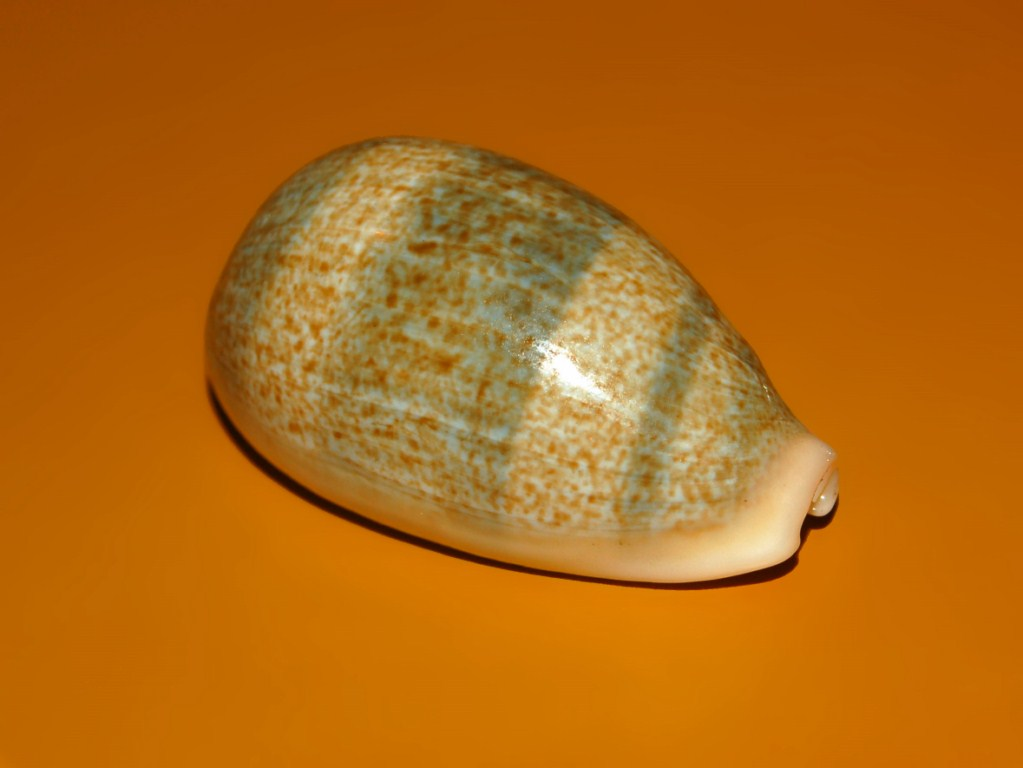
Erronea errones, anterior end towards the right

== Distribution ==
This species is distributed in the East Indian Ocean along South India, Andaman Islands, Madagascar and Tanzania, as well in West Pacific Ocean along Indonesia, Malaysia, Philippines, New Caledonia, Samoa and Australia.

== Habitat ==
These cowries live in shallow tropical waters at low tide, usually under rocks or stones, feeding on algae.

== Synonyms ==
- Cypraea errones, Linnaeus, 1758
- Cypraea oblonga, Gmelin, J.F., 1791
- Cypraea bimaculata, (Gray 1824)
- Cypraea coxi, (Brazier 1872)
- Cypraea pusilla, Gmelin, J.F., 1791
- Cypraea coerulescens, Schroter, J.S., 1804 : E Australia
- Cypraea ovum, Kiener, L.C., 1843
- Cypraea chrysophaea, Melvill, J.C., 1888
- Cypraea compressa, Dautzenberg, Ph., 1903
- Erronea nimiproba, Iredale, T., 1935
- Cypraea nimiserrans, Iredale, T., 1935
- Cypraea magerrones, Iredale, T., 1939 : E Australia
- Cypraea proba, Iredale, T., 1939 : W Australia
- Erronea kalavo, Steadman, W.R. & B.C. Cotton, 1943
- Erronea vivili, Steadman, W.R. & B.C. Cotton, 1943
- Palmadusta asellus fusca (f), Coen, G.S., 1949
- Erronea fusca, Coen, G.S., 1949
