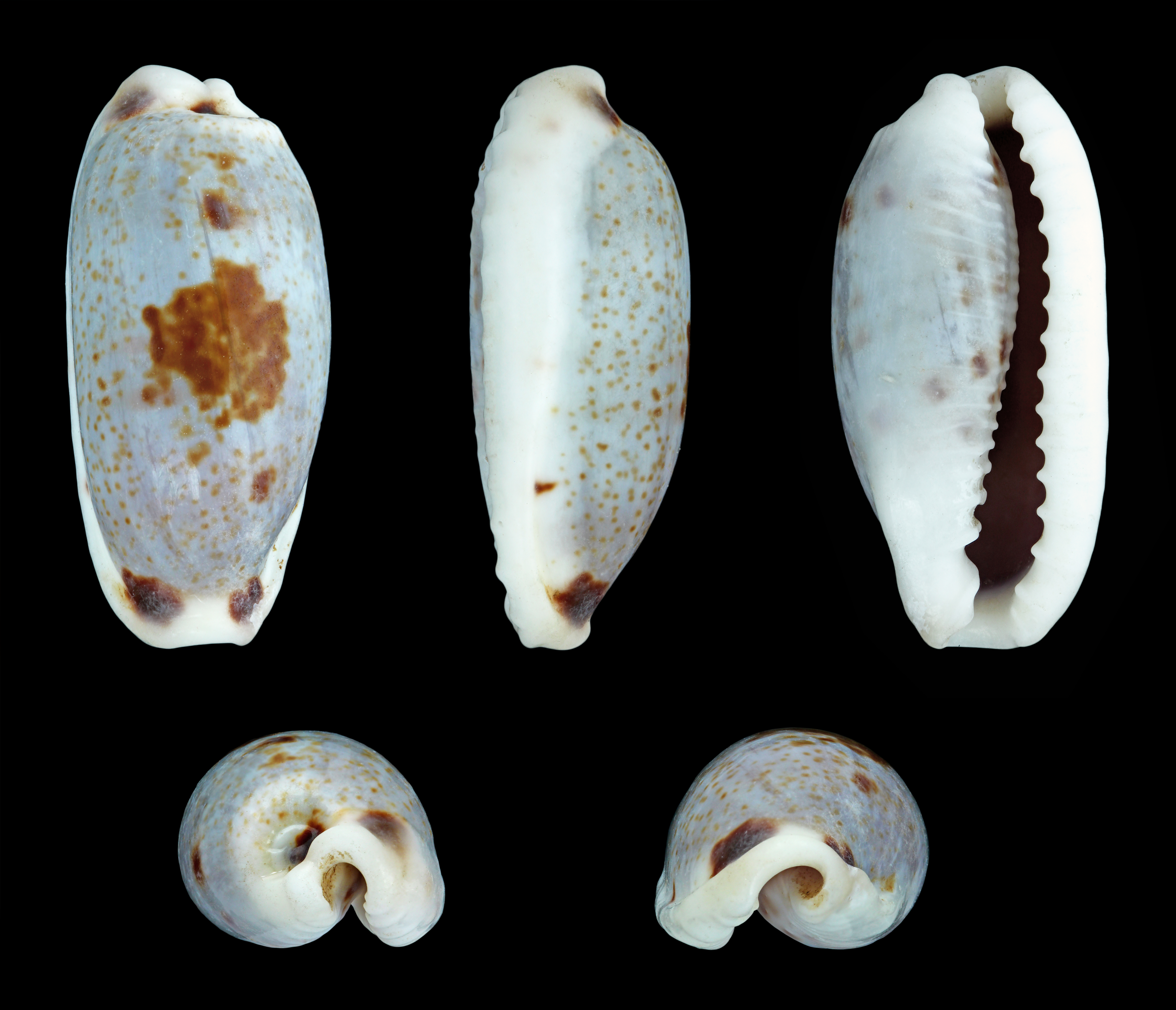

Scientific classification
- Kingdom: Animalia
- Phylum: Mollusca
- Class: Gastropoda
- Subclass: Caenogastropoda
- Order: Littorinimorpha
- Family: Cypraeidae
- Genus: Erronea
- Species: E. cylindrica

Binomial name
- Erronea cylindrica (Born, 1778)

Synonyms
- Cypraea cylindrica Born, 1778

= Erronea cylindrica =

Species of gastropod

Erronea cylindrica is a species of sea snail, a cowry, a marine gastropod mollusk in the family Cypraeidae, the cowries.

== Description ==
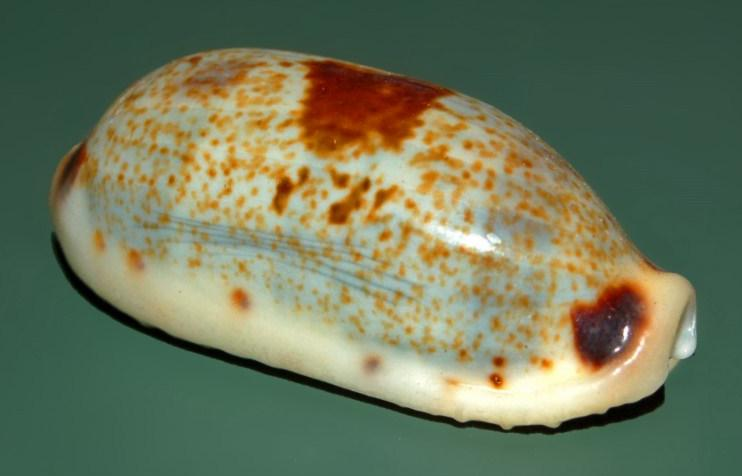
Erronea cylindrica, side view - Philippines

The shells reach 15–47 millimetres (0.59–1.85 in) of length. These cowries have a surface smooth and shiny. They are cylindrical, their basic coloration is pale brown or greenish, with irregular dark brown patches on the dorsum. The extremities are brown too. The lateral margins and the flat base are white.

== Habitat ==
They are living in warm tropical and subtropical waters, from intertidal zone to the deep reef, in coral reefs or sandy surfaces. Often they can be encountered in the low intertidal zone near the line of reef. As they fear light, during the day they are usually hidden beneath the reef rocks and coral caves. At dawn or dusk they feed, mainly on sponges, algae, small crustaceans and polyps of corals. Mantle and foot are well developed, with external antennae.

== Distribution ==
This species is found throughout the tropical Western and Central Pacific Ocean and in the Indian Ocean, in seas along Thailand, NW Australia, Philippines, New Zealand, New Caledonia, Guam and Madagascar.
