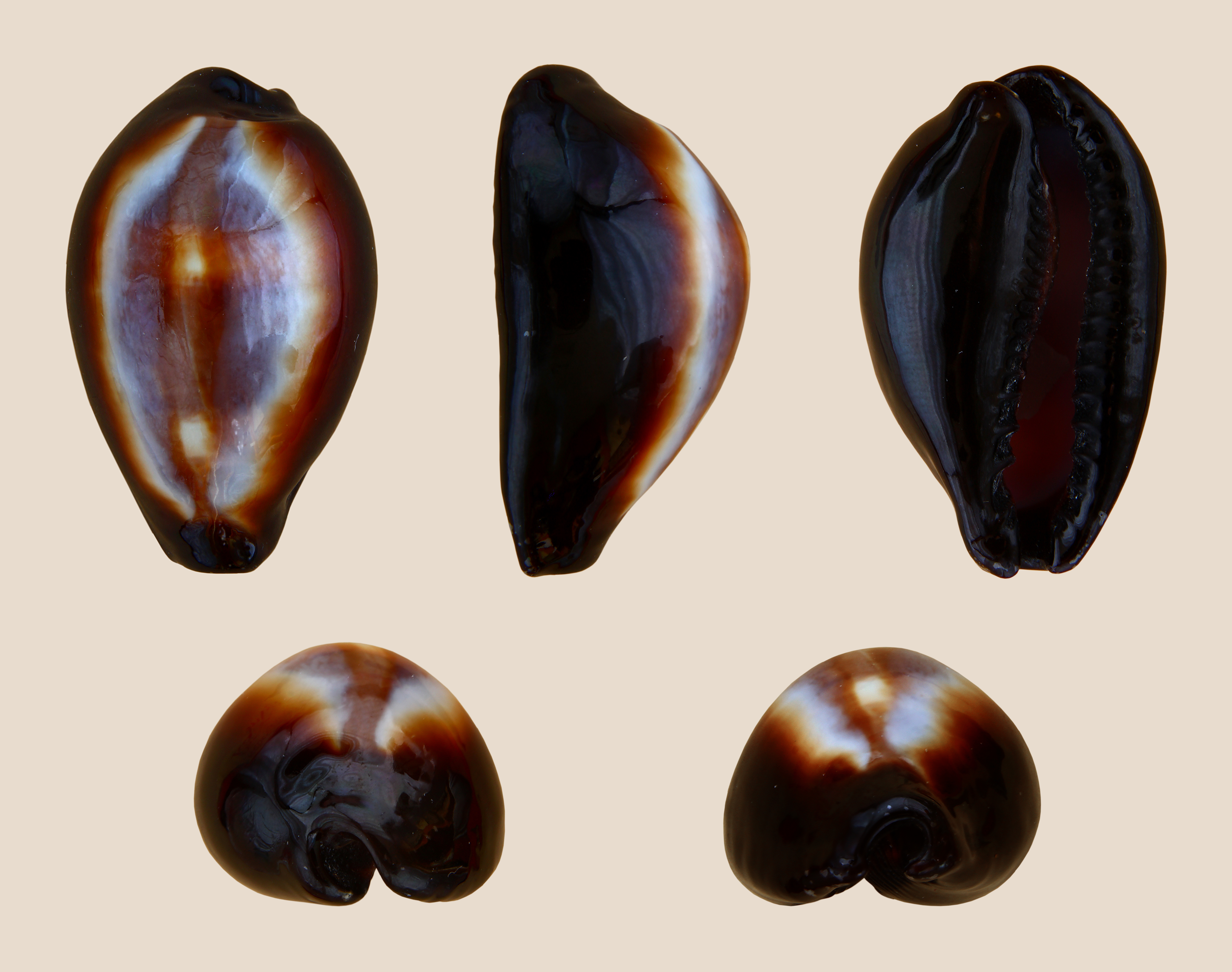
- Five views of a shell of Erronea onyx

Scientific classification
- Kingdom: Animalia
- Phylum: Mollusca
- Class: Gastropoda
- Subclass: Caenogastropoda
- Order: Littorinimorpha
- Family: Cypraeidae
- Genus: Erronea
- Species: E. onyx

Binomial name
- Erronea onyx (Linnaeus, 1758)

Synonyms
- Cypraea onyx Linnaeus, 1758 (basionym); Cypraea pulla Gmelin, 1791; Cypraea prunus Röding, 1798

= Erronea onyx =

Species of gastropod

Erronea onyx, common name the onyx cowry, is a species of sea snail, a cowry, a marine gastropod mollusk in the family Cypraeidae, the cowries.

== Description ==
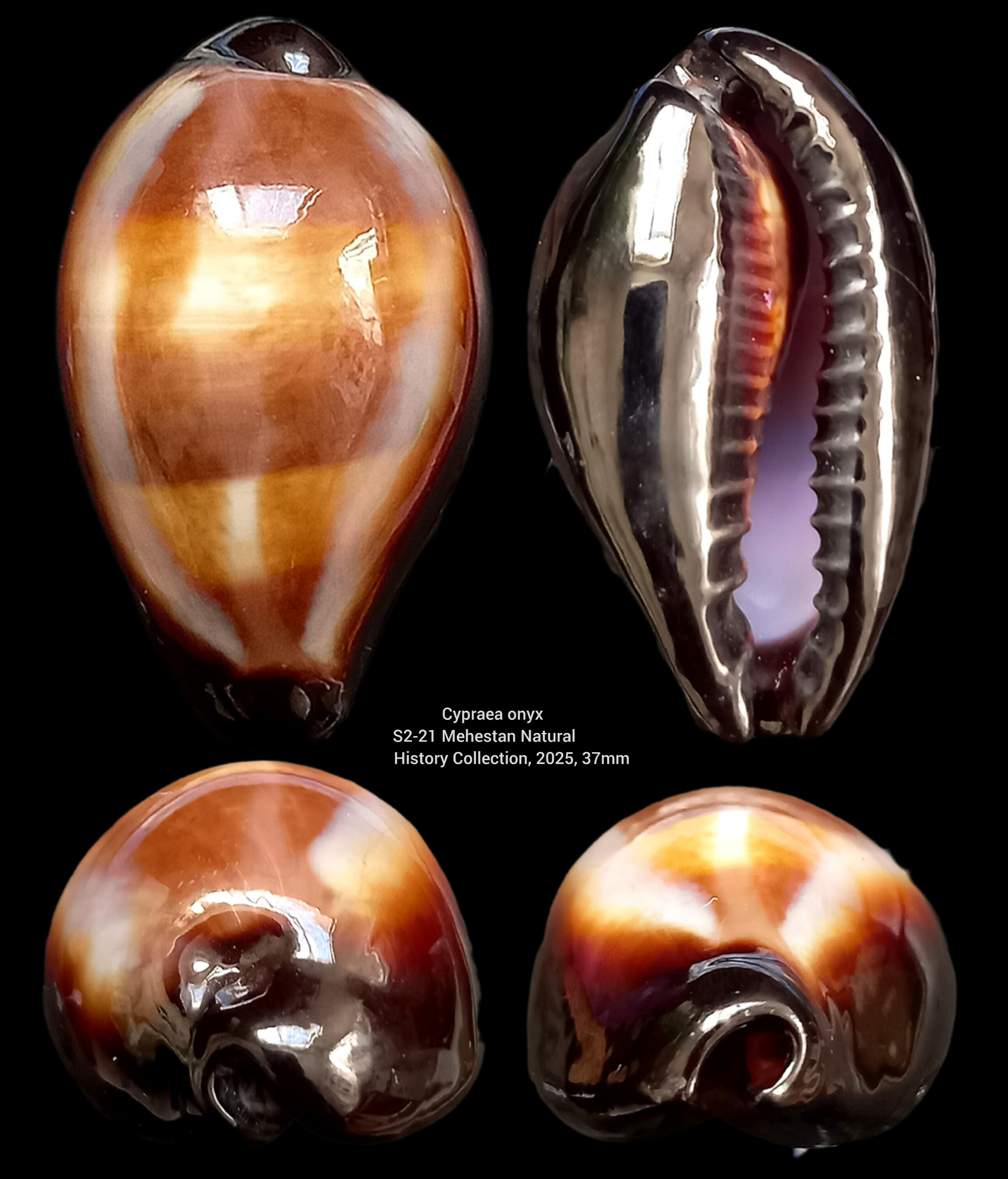
Cypraea onyx S2-21 37mm

The shells of these quite common cowries reach on average 32–38 millimetres (1.3–1.5 in) of length, with a minimum size of 24 millimetres (0.94 in) and a maximum size of 57 millimetres (2.2 in). The dorsum surface of Erronea onyx is smooth, shiny and generally golden brown, with alternating longitudinal fuzzy bands of translucent bluish and reddish colors (hence the Latin name onyx). The base and the margins are dark brown or black, sometimes the teeth are orange. In the living cowries mantle is dark brown, quite thin, with bluish papillae.

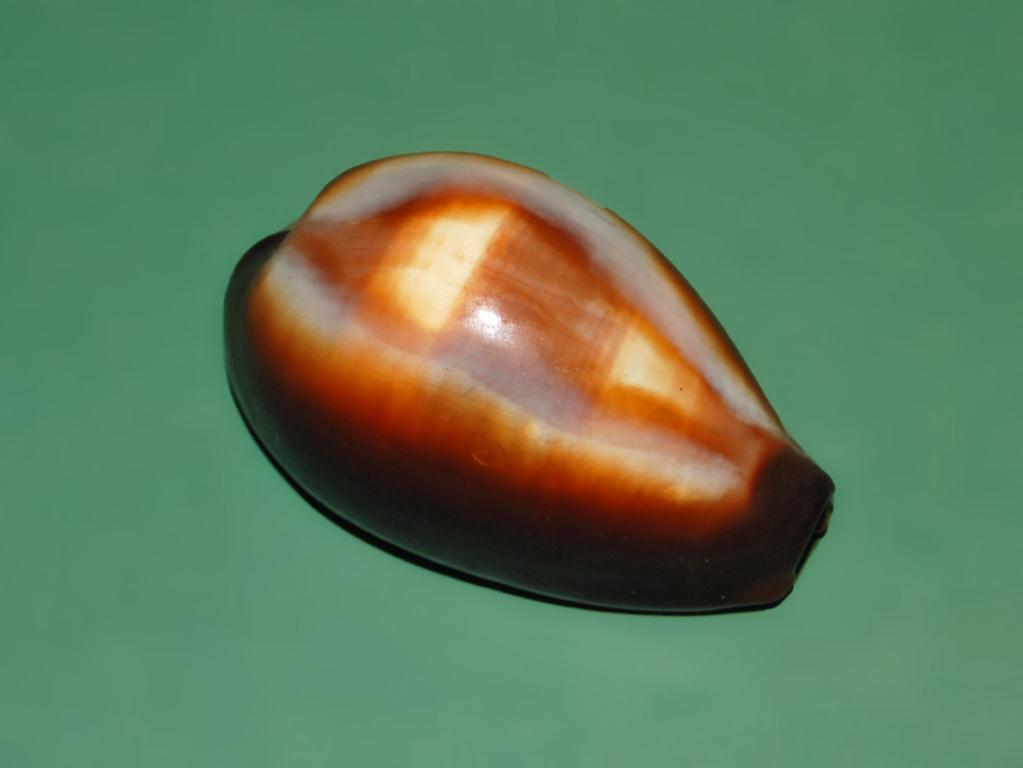
Shell of Erronea onyx

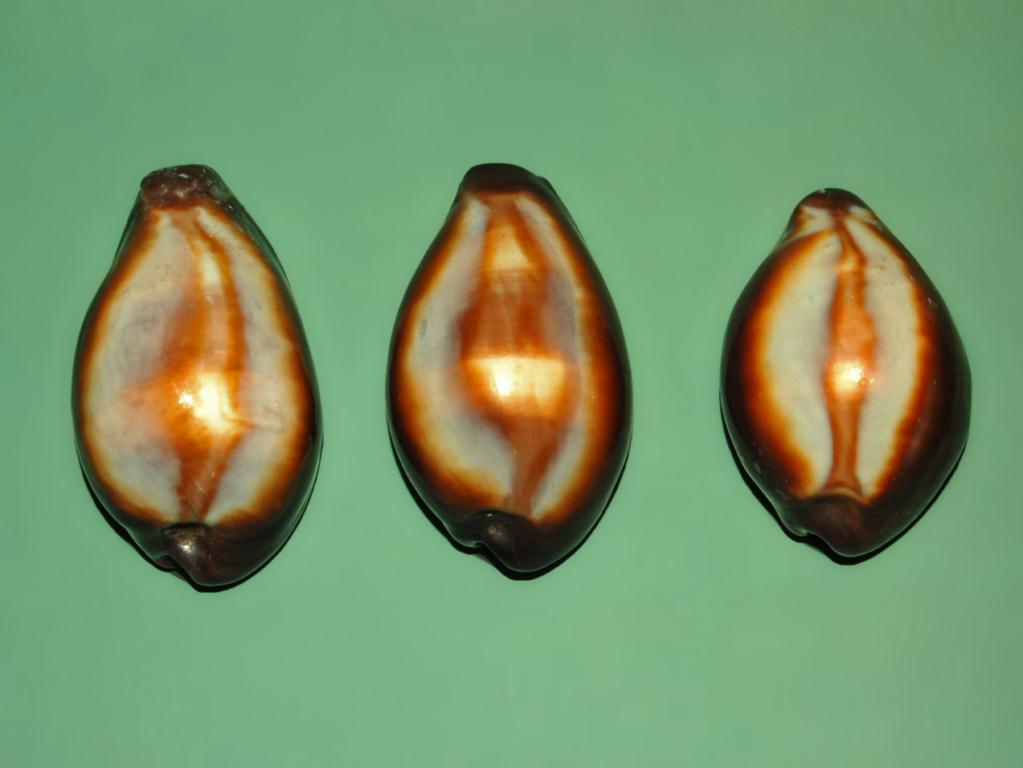
Dorsal view of three shells of Erronea onyx

== Distribution ==
This species occurs the Indian Ocean on the coasts of Aldabra, the Comores, Kenya, Madagascar, Mauritius, Mozambique, Réunion, the Seychelles, Tanzania and in the Pacific Ocean along East China, Thailand, northern Australia, Indonesia, Philippines, Palau Islands and Solomon Islands.

== Habitat ==
Erronea onyx lives in tropical and subtropical zones, in shallow subtidal water up to 5–25 metres (16–82 ft) depth, mainly in muddy areas or sandy sea floor, feeding on algae or coral polyps.

== Subspecies ==
What used to be called Erronea onyx adusta, Lamarck, 1810 is now accepted as Erronea adusta.
