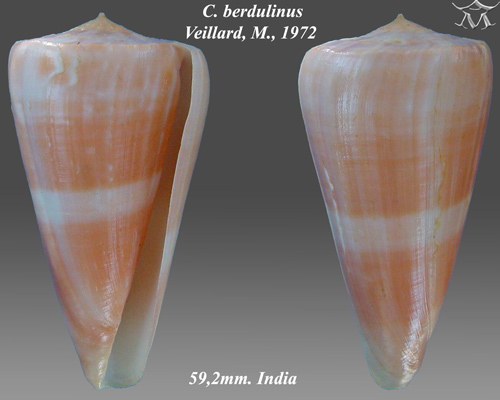
- Apertural and abapertural views of shell of Conus berdulinus (M. Veillard, 1972)

Scientific classification
- Kingdom: Animalia
- Phylum: Mollusca
- Class: Gastropoda
- Subclass: Caenogastropoda
- Order: Neogastropoda
- Family: Conidae
- Genus: Conus
- Subgenus: Virgiconus; Cotton, 1945

Type species
- Conus virgo Linnaeus, 1758

Synonyms
- Virgiconus Cotton, 1945

= Conus (Virgiconus) =

Subgenus of gastropods

Virgiconus is a subgenus of sea snails, marine gastropod mollusks in the genus Conus, family Conidae, the cone snails and their allies.

In the latest classification of the family Conidae by Puillandre N., Duda T.F., Meyer C., Olivera B.M. & Bouchet P. (2015), Virgiconus has become a subgenus of Conus as Conus (Virgiconus) Cotton, 1945 (type species: Conus virgo Linnaeus, 1758): synonym of Conus Linnaeus, 1758

== Species ==
- Virgiconus berdulinus (Veillard, 1972) represented as Conus berdulinus Veillard, 1972 (alternate representation)
- Virgiconus coelinae (Crosse, 1858) represented as Conus coelinae Crosse, 1858 (alternate representation)
- Virgiconus emaciatus (Reeve, 1849) represented as Conus emaciatus Reeve, 1849 (alternate representation)
- Virgiconus flavidus (Lamarck, 1810) represented as Conus flavidus Lamarck, 1810 (alternate representation)
- Virgiconus frigidus (Reeve, 1848) represented as Conus frigidus Reeve, 1848 (alternate representation)
- Virgiconus kintoki (Habe & Kosuge, 1970) represented as Conus kintoki Habe & Kosuge, 1970 (alternate representation)
- Virgiconus moreleti (Crosse, 1858) represented as Conus moreleti Crosse, 1858 (alternate representation)
- Virgiconus spiceri (Bartsch & Rehder, 1943) represented as Conus spiceri Bartsch & Rehder, 1943 (alternate representation)
- Virgiconus terebra (Born, 1778) represented as Conus terebra Born, 1778 (alternate representation)
- Virgiconus tethys Petuch & Sargent, 2011: synonym of Conus tethys (Petuch & Sargent, 2011)
- Virgiconus thalassiarchus (G.B. Sowerby I, 1834) represented as Conus thalassiarchus G. B. Sowerby I, 1834 (alternate representation)
- Virgiconus virgo (Linnaeus, 1758) represented as Conus virgo Linnaeus, 1758 (alternate representation)
