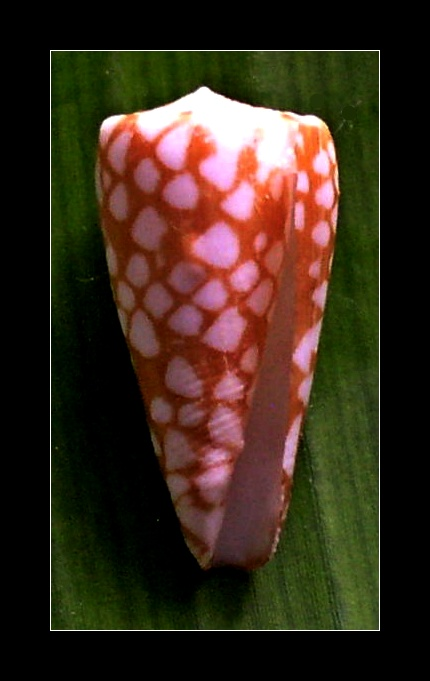
- Apertural view of shell of Eugeniconus nobilis (Linnaeus, 1758) which represented as Conus nobilis Linnaeus, 1758

Scientific classification
- Kingdom: Animalia
- Phylum: Mollusca
- Class: Gastropoda
- Subclass: Caenogastropoda
- Order: Neogastropoda
- Family: Conidae
- Genus: Conus
- Subgenus: Eugeniconus da Motta, 1991

Type species
- Conus nobilis Linnaeus, 1758

Synonyms
- Eugeniconus da Motta, 1991

= Conus (Eugeniconus) =

Subgenus of gastropods

Eugeniconus is a subgenus of sea snails, marine gastropod molluscs in the genus Conus, family Conidae, the cone snails and their allies.

In the latest classification of the family Conidae by Puillandre N., Duda T.F., Meyer C., Olivera B.M. & Bouchet P. (2015), Eugeniconus has become a subgenus of Conus as Conus (Eugeniconus) represented as Conus Linnaeus, 1758

== Distinguishing characteristics ==
The Tucker & Tenorio 2009 taxonomy distinguishes Eugeniconus from Conus in the following ways:

- Genus Conus sensu stricto Linnaeus, 1758

Shell characters (living and fossil species)

The basic shell shape is conical to elongated conical, has a deep anal notch on the shoulder, a smooth periostracum and a small operculum. The shoulder of the shell is usually nodulose and the protoconch is usually multispiral. Markings often include the presence of tents except for black or white color variants, with the absence of spiral lines of minute tents and textile bars.

Radular tooth (not known for fossil species)

The radula has an elongated anterior section with serrations and a large exposed terminating cusp, a non-obvious waist, blade is either small or absent and has a short barb, and lacks a basal spur.

Geographical distribution

These species are found in the Indo-Pacific region.

Feeding habits

These species eat other gastropods including cones.

- Subgenus Eugeniconus da Motta, 1991

Shell characters (living and fossil species)

The shell is obconic to cylindrical in shape. The protoconch is paucispiral, and the whorl tops are concave. Nodules are present but die out in early to middle spire whorls. The shell is often ornamented with spiral lines of minute tents, and textile bars are absent. The anal notch is deep. The periostracum is smooth, and the operculum is small.

Radular tooth (not known for fossil species)

The anterior section of the radula is roughly equal to the posterior section. The blade is fairly long and may extend half the length of the anterior section. The basal spur is absent, and the barb is short. The waist is obvious. The radular tooth has a short row of serrations and a terminating cusp.

Geographical distribution

These species are found in the Indo-Pacific region.

Feeding habits

These species are molluscivorous (the prey on other mollusks).

== Species list ==
This list of species is based on the information in the World Register of Marine Species (WoRMS) list. Species within the genus Eugeniconus include:

- Eugeniconus cordigera (G.B. Sowerby II, 1866): synonym of Conus (Eugeniconus) cordigera G. B. Sowerby II, 1866 represented as Conus cordigera G. B. Sowerby II, 1866
- Eugeniconus friedae da Motta, 1991: synonym of Conus nobilis Linnaeus, 1758
- Eugeniconus marchionatus (Hinds, 1843): synonym of Conus (Eugeniconus) marchionatus Hinds, 1843, represented as Conus marchionatus Hinds, 1843
- Eugeniconus nobilis (Linnaeus, 1758): synonym of Conus (Eugeniconus) nobilis Linnaeus, 1758, represented as Conus nobilis Linnaeus, 1758
