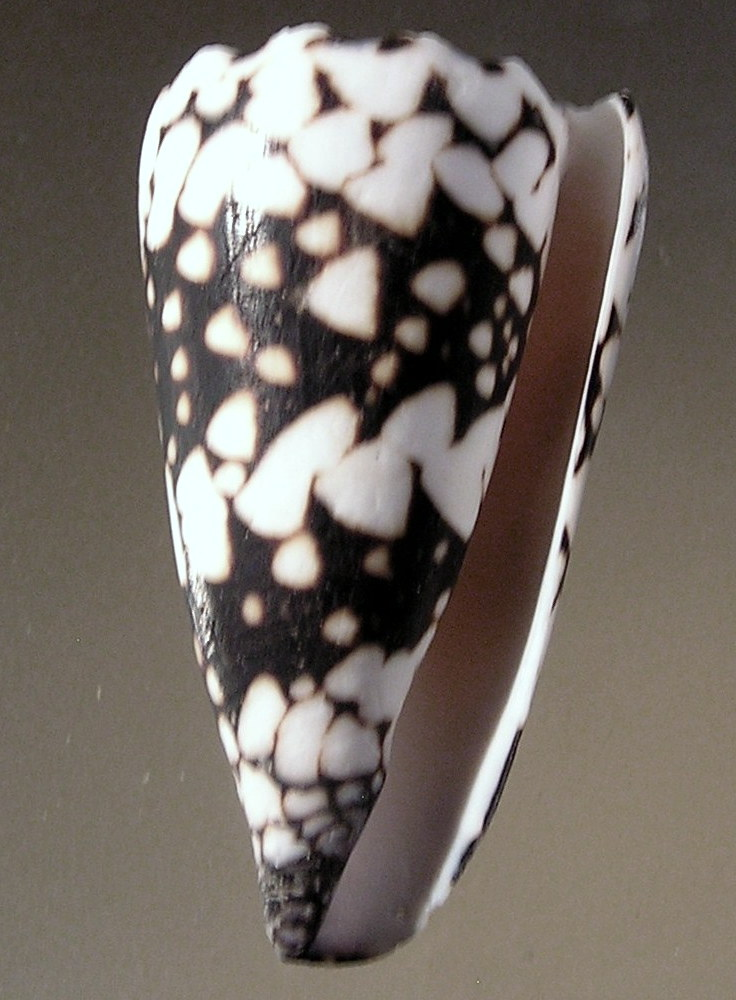
- Abapertural view of a shell of Conus vidua

Scientific classification
- Kingdom: Animalia
- Phylum: Mollusca
- Class: Gastropoda
- Subclass: Caenogastropoda
- Order: Neogastropoda
- Superfamily: Conoidea
- Family: Conidae
- Genus: Conus
- Species: C. vidua

Binomial name
- Conus vidua Reeve, 1843

Synonyms
- Conus (Conus) vidua Reeve, 1843 · accepted, alternate representation

= Conus vidua =

Species of sea snail

Conus vidua, common name the vidua cone, is a species of sea snail, a marine gastropod mollusk in the family Conidae, the cone snails, cone shells or cones.

These snails are predatory and venomous. They are capable of stinging humans.

Subspecies

- Conus vidua cuyoensis Lorenz & Barbier, 2012
- Conus vidua vidua Reeve, 1843

Forma and varieties brought into synonymy

- Conus vidua f. mozoii L. S. Melvin, 1980: synonym of Conus bandanus Hwass in Bruguière, 1792
- Conus vidua var. azona Wils, 1972: synonym of Conus thalassiarchus G. B. Sowerby I, 1834
- Conus vidua var. depriesteri Wils, 1972: synonym of Conus thalassiarchus G. B. Sowerby I, 1834

== Description ==
The size of the shell varies between 42 mm and 150 mm. This species is closely related to Conus araneosus nicobaricus Hwass in Bruguière, 1792, but the bands not so well outlined usually, and are scattered with triangular white spots upon them.

== Distribution ==
This marine species occurs off the Philippines.
