= Conus Marmoreus (print) =

1650 etching by Rembrandt van Rijn

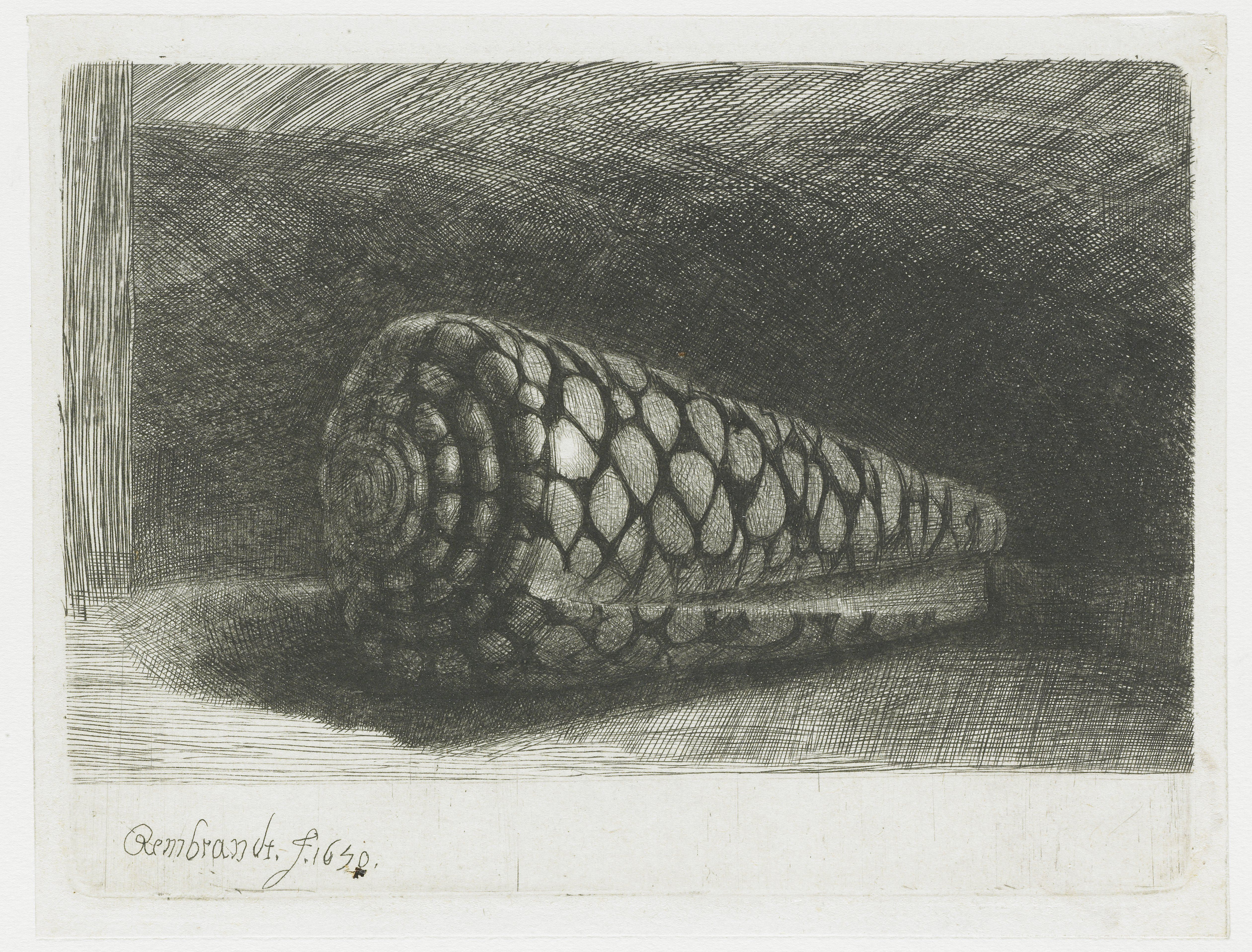
Third state, Rijksmuseum, signed "Rembrandt. f. 1650"

The Shell, also known as Rembrandt's Shell or Conus Marmoreus, or in Dutch as De schelp ("the shell") or Het schelpje ("the little shell"), is a 1650 drypoint and etching by Rembrandt van Rijn. Catalogued as B.159, it is Rembrandt's only still life etching. Only a handful of original prints are known, in three states.

The print depicts the shell of a Conus marmoreus (marbled cone), then known as the Herts Horen (Dutch: "stag's horn"), when it was a rare import to Europe from the Indian Ocean. Rembrandt owned an example along with several other exotic shells in his personal collection of interesting objects which he kept in a special room, his "kunstcaemer" (cabinet of curiosities), at his house in Amsterdam. The print shows the shell as 2.5 in (6.4 cm) long, which is probably life size. It appears that Rembrandt copied the shell from life onto the plate, so it is reversed in the print: the printed shell has an anticlockwise or sinistral spiral, but all specimens of this species have clockwise or dextral shells. Rembrandt added his signature and the date in reverse, so they print correctly.

The print is known in three states. The first state was drawn with drypoint only, and shows the shell and its shadow against a plain background. The second state is reworked with etching, and adds a shadowed background space reminiscent of a shelf or box. The spiral end of the shell is reworked with drypoint and burin in the third state to make it clearer. Examples of all three states are held in public collections, but all are rare: only five impressions of the first state are known, there are eleven impressions of the second state in public collections (but others in private collections), and the third state is known from one impression held by the Rijksmuseum in Amsterdam. An impression fetched $118,000 at auction in 1997.

The first state resembles a series of similar shell etchings by Wenceslaus Hollar, c. 1645, which depict a variety of shells against a plain background without shadows. Hollar's etchings are thought to have inspired Rembrandt, and Rembrandt's print in turn inspired later artists to make faithful copies.

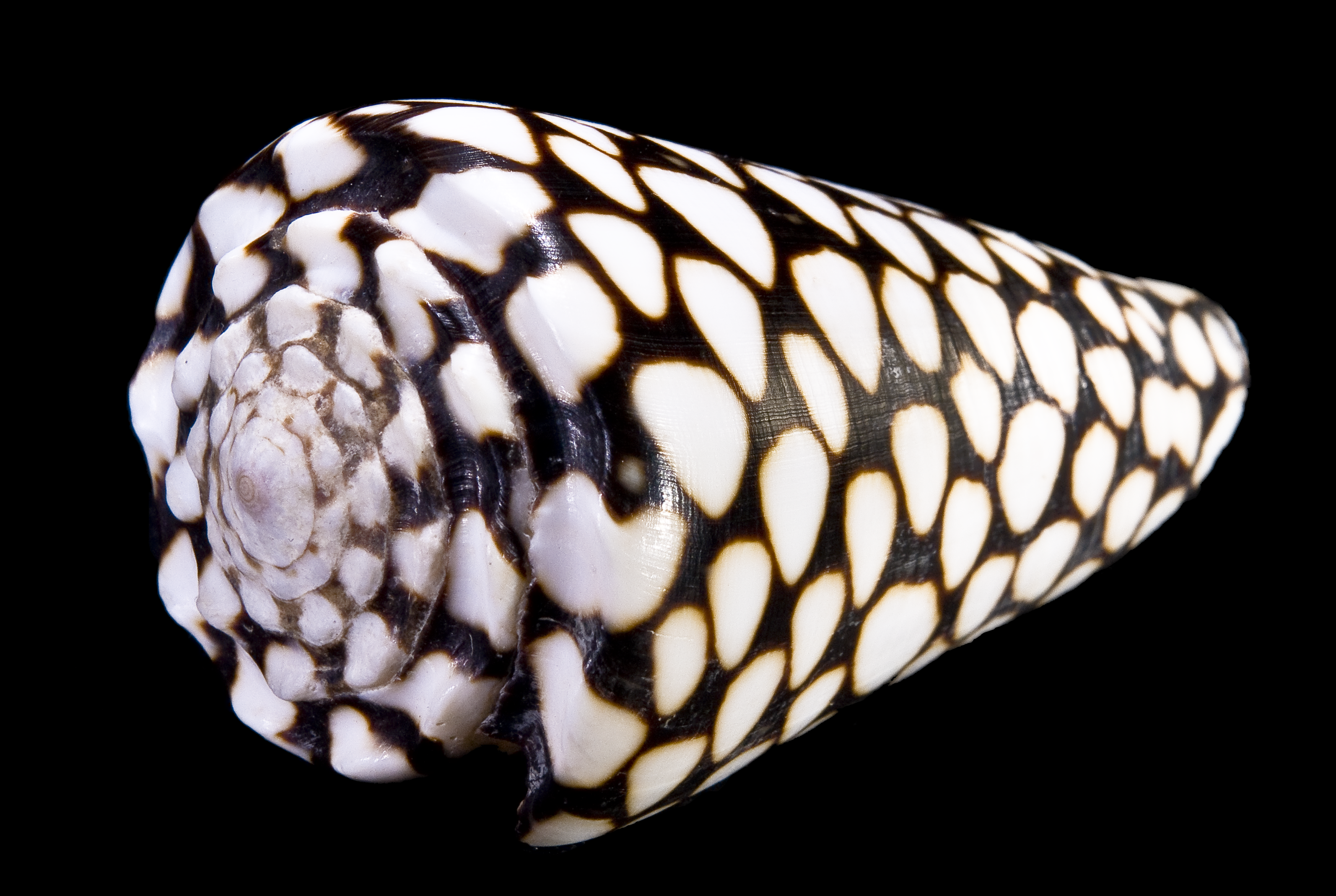
Conus marmoreus shell

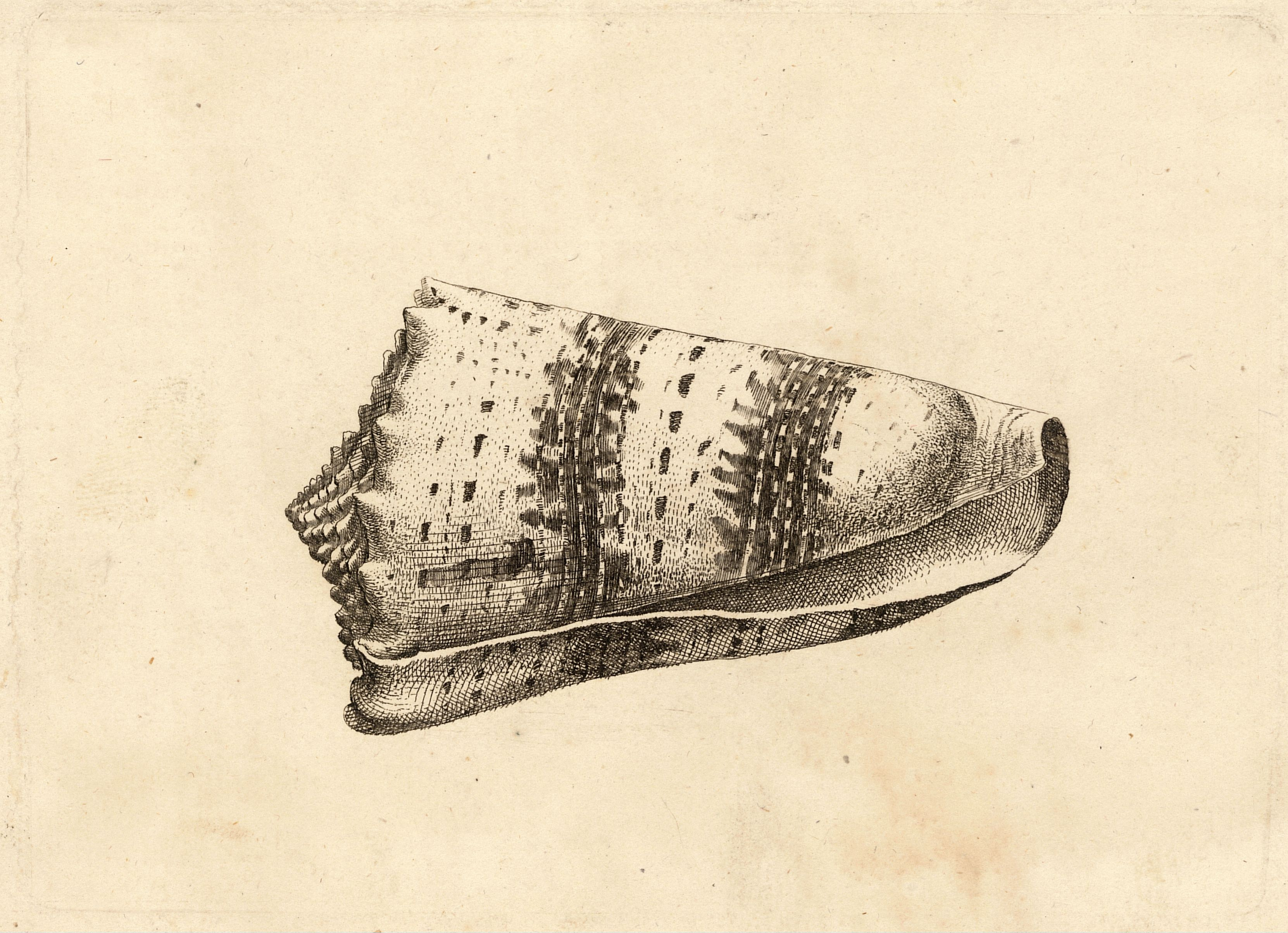
Etching of Conus imperialis shell by Wenceslas Hollar, c. 1645

== See also ==
- List of drawings by Rembrandt
- List of etchings by Rembrandt
