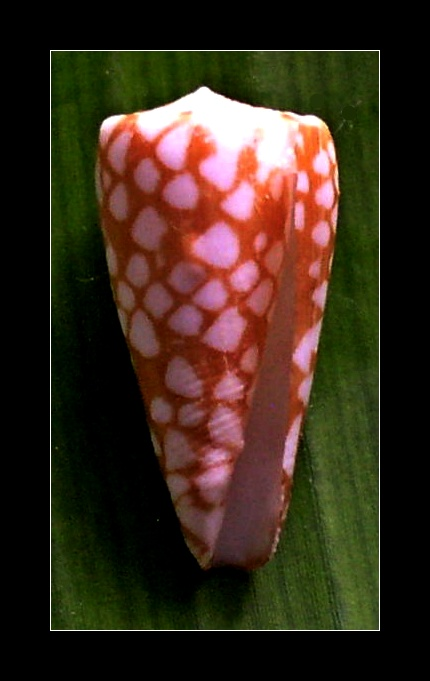

Conservation status
- Least Concern (IUCN 3.1)

Scientific classification
- Kingdom: Animalia
- Phylum: Mollusca
- Class: Gastropoda
- Subclass: Caenogastropoda
- Order: Neogastropoda
- Superfamily: Conoidea
- Family: Conidae
- Genus: Conus
- Species: C. nobilis

Binomial name
- Conus nobilis Linnaeus, 1758

Synonyms
- Conus (Eugeniconus) nobilis Linnaeus, 1758 · accepted, alternate representation; Conus cervulus "Meuschen, F.C." Dillwyn, L.W., 1817; Conus nobilis friedae da Motta, 1991; Conus nobilis nobilis Linnaeus, 1758; Eugeniconus friedae da Motta, 1991; Eugeniconus nobilis (Linnaeus, 1758); Eugeniconus nobilis nobilis (Linnaeus, 1758)

= Conus nobilis =

Species of sea snail

Conus nobilis, common name the noble cone, is a species of sea snail, a marine gastropod mollusk in the family Conidae, the cone snails and their allies.

Like all species within the genus Conus, these snails are predatory and venomous.

Subspecies

- Conus nobilis renateae Cailliez, 1993 (synonym: Eugeniconus nobilis renateae (Cailliez, 1993))
- Conus nobilis skinneri da Motta, 1982 (synonyms: Conus skinneri da Motta, 1982; Eugeniconus nobilis skinneri (da Motta, 1982))
- Conus nobilis victor Broderip, 1842 (synonyms: Conus nobilis abbai Poppe & Tagaro, 2011; Conus nobilis var. vincoomnes Lichtenstein, 1794)
- Conus nobilis bitleri da Motta, 1984: synonym of Conus cordigera G. B. Sowerby II, 1866
- Conus nobilis cordigera G. B. Sowerby, 1866: synonym of Conus cordigera G. B. Sowerby II, 1866

== Description ==
The size of an adult shell varies between 29 mm and 71 mm. The spire is depressed, with sulcate and finely striate volutions. The shoulder angles are sharp. The color of the shell is yellowish brown or chestnut, with close revolving lines of numerous small chestnut spots. The whole surface is irregularly overlaid by triangular large white spots.

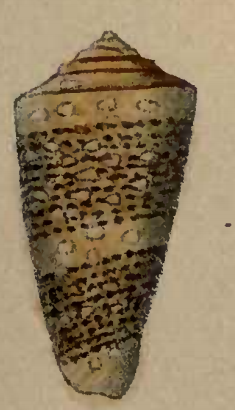
Conus nobilis victor

== Distribution ==
This marine species is found in sublittoral and deeper waters of the Indo-Pacific from Sri Lanka, the Andaman Islands and Nicobar Islands along Sumatra and Java to Timor; along the Marquesas Islands.
