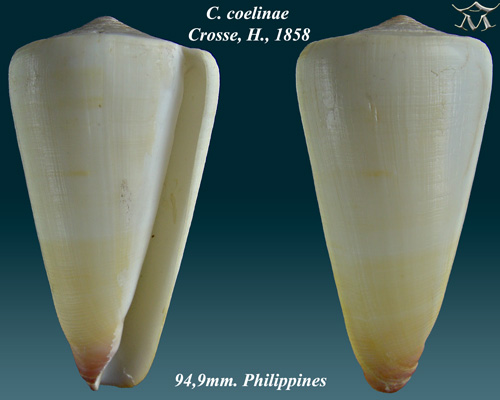
- Apertural and abapertural views of shell of Conus coelinae Crosse, H., 1858
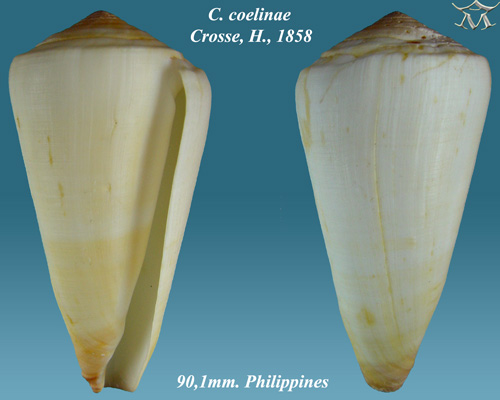

Conservation status
- Least Concern (IUCN 3.1)

Scientific classification
- Kingdom: Animalia
- Phylum: Mollusca
- Class: Gastropoda
- Subclass: Caenogastropoda
- Order: Neogastropoda
- Superfamily: Conoidea
- Family: Conidae
- Genus: Conus
- Species: C. coelinae

Binomial name
- Conus coelinae Crosse, 1858

Synonyms
- Conus (Virgiconus) coelinae Crosse, 1858 accepted, alternate representation; Conus pseudocoelinae Delsaerdt, 1989; Virgiconus coelinae (Crosse, 1858)

= Conus coelinae =

Species of sea snail

Conus coelinae, common name Celine's cone, is a species of sea snail, a marine gastropod mollusk in the family Conidae, the cone snails and their allies.

Like all species within the genus Conus, these snails are predatory and venomous. They are capable of stinging humans, therefore live ones should be handled carefully or not at all.

The former subspecies Conus coelinae spiceri Bartsch & Rehder, 1943 has been elevated to the status of genus Conus spiceri Bartsch & Rehder, 1943

== Description ==
The size of the shell varies between 55 mm and 128 mm.

== Distribution ==
This species occurs in the Indian Ocean off the Mascarene Basin; in the Pacific Ocean off Hawaii and the Philippines; off the Loyalty Islands, New Caledonia, Solomon Islands, Marshall Islands, New Zealand and Australia (Queensland)
