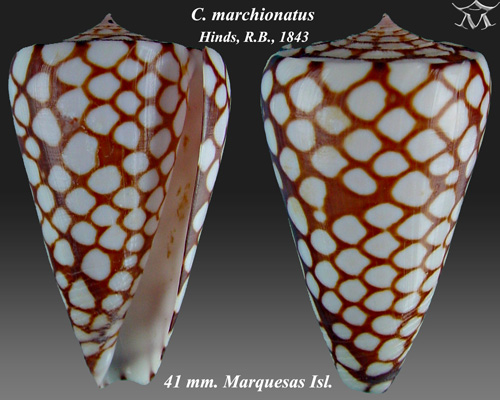
- Apertural and abapertural views of the shell of Conus marchionatus Hinds, 1843
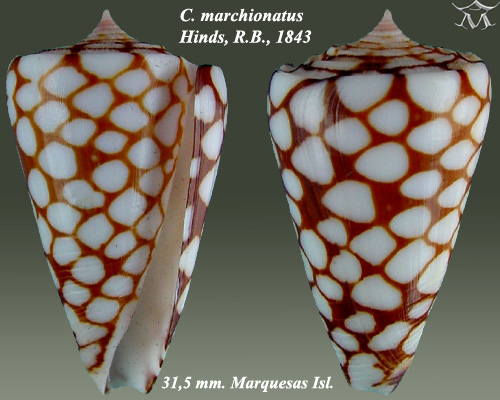

Scientific classification
- Kingdom: Animalia
- Phylum: Mollusca
- Class: Gastropoda
- Subclass: Caenogastropoda
- Order: Neogastropoda
- Superfamily: Conoidea
- Family: Conidae
- Genus: Conus
- Species: C. marchionatus

Binomial name
- Conus marchionatus Hinds, 1843

Synonyms
- Conus (Eugeniconus) marchionatus Hinds, 1843 · accepted, alternate representation; Conus caelatus A. Adams, 1855; Conus marchionatus var. eudoxus Tryon, 1884; Eugeniconus marchionatus (Hinds, 1843)

= Conus marchionatus =

Species of sea snail

Conus marchionatus, commonly known as the Marquesas cone, is a species of sea snail, a marine gastropod mollusk in the family Conidae, which includes the cone snails and their allies.

Like all species within the genus Conus, these snails are predatory and venomous, and are capable of stinging humans.

== Description ==
The size of the shell varies between 12 mm and 68 mm. The spire is depressed and shows spiral striae. Its color is yellowish or light brown, with large white rounded triangular spots. The pattern of coloring is similar to Conus marmoreus, but lighter. The shell is immediately distinguished by the lack of the coronal of tubercles and its usually small size.

== Distribution ==
This species occurs in the Pacific Ocean off the Marquesas.
