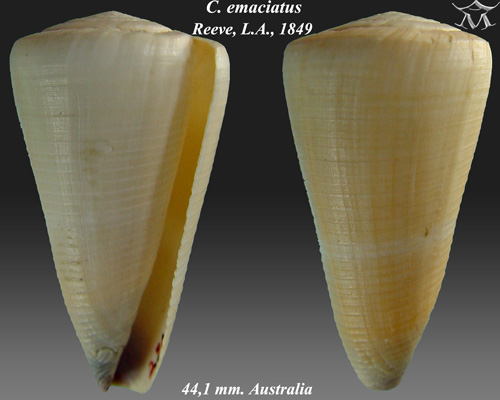
- Apertural and abapertural views of shell of Conus emaciatus Reeve, L.A., 1849
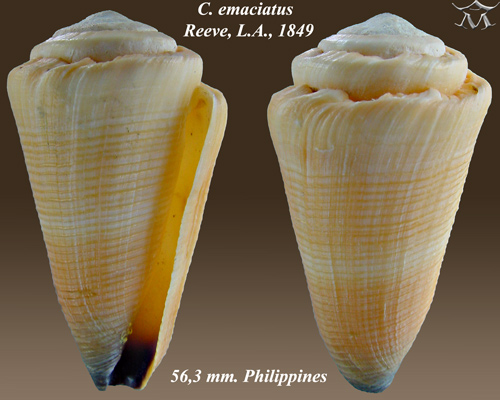

Conservation status
- Least Concern (IUCN 3.1)

Scientific classification
- Kingdom: Animalia
- Phylum: Mollusca
- Class: Gastropoda
- Subclass: Caenogastropoda
- Order: Neogastropoda
- Superfamily: Conoidea
- Family: Conidae
- Genus: Conus
- Species: C. emaciatus

Binomial name
- Conus emaciatus Reeve, 1849

Synonyms
- Conus (Virgiconusà emaciatus Reeve, 1849; Virgiconus emaciatus (Reeve, 1849)

= Conus emaciatus =

Species of sea snail

Conus emaciatus, common name the false virgin cone, is a species of sea snail, a marine gastropod mollusk in the family Conidae, the cone snails and their allies.

Like all species within the genus Conus, these snails are predatory and venomous. They are capable of stinging humans, therefore live ones should be handled carefully or not at all.

== Description ==
The size of the shell varies between 30 mm and 69 mm. The narrow shell shows a depressed conical spire, ridged-striate throughout. Its color is light yellow and violet-stained at the base.

== Distribution ==
This marine species occurs in the Red Sea and in the tropical Indo-West Pacific and off the Philippines and Australia (Queensland).
