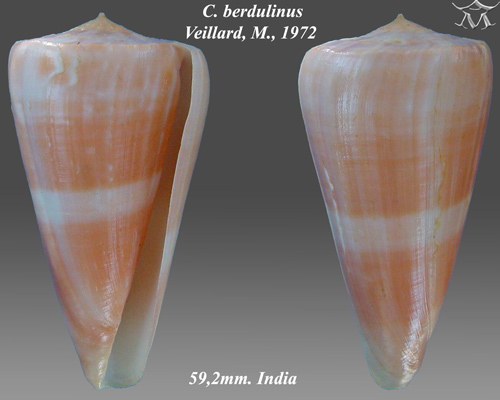
- Apertural and abapertural views of shell of Conus berdulinus Veillard, M., 1972
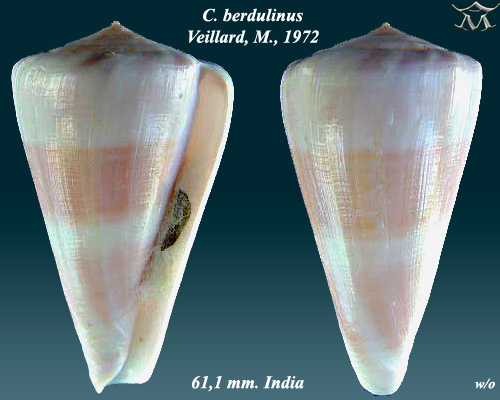

Conservation status
- Least Concern (IUCN 3.1)

Scientific classification
- Kingdom: Animalia
- Phylum: Mollusca
- Class: Gastropoda
- Subclass: Caenogastropoda
- Order: Neogastropoda
- Superfamily: Conoidea
- Family: Conidae
- Genus: Conus
- Species: C. berdulinus

Binomial name
- Conus berdulinus Veillard, 1972

Synonyms
- Conus (Virgiconus) berdulinus Veillard, 1972 accepted, alternate representation; Virgiconus berdulinus (Veillard, 1972)

= Conus berdulinus =

Species of sea snail

Conus berdulinus is a species of sea snail, a marine gastropod mollusk in the family Conidae, the cone snails and their allies.

Like all species within the genus Conus, these snails are predatory and venomous. They are capable of stinging humans, therefore live ones should be handled carefully or not at all.

== Description ==
The size of the shell varies between 48 mm and 100 mm.

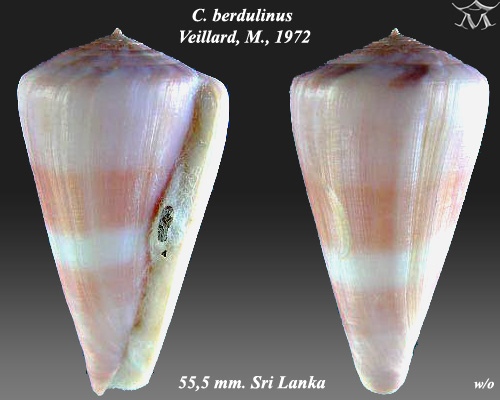
A shell of Conus berdulinus

== Distribution ==
This species occurs in the Indian Ocean from Natal, South Africa to Mozambique and the Mascarenes, Somalia; off Southern Oman and Southern India; in the Pacific Ocean off Midway and Hawaii; in the South China Sea and off the Philippines.
