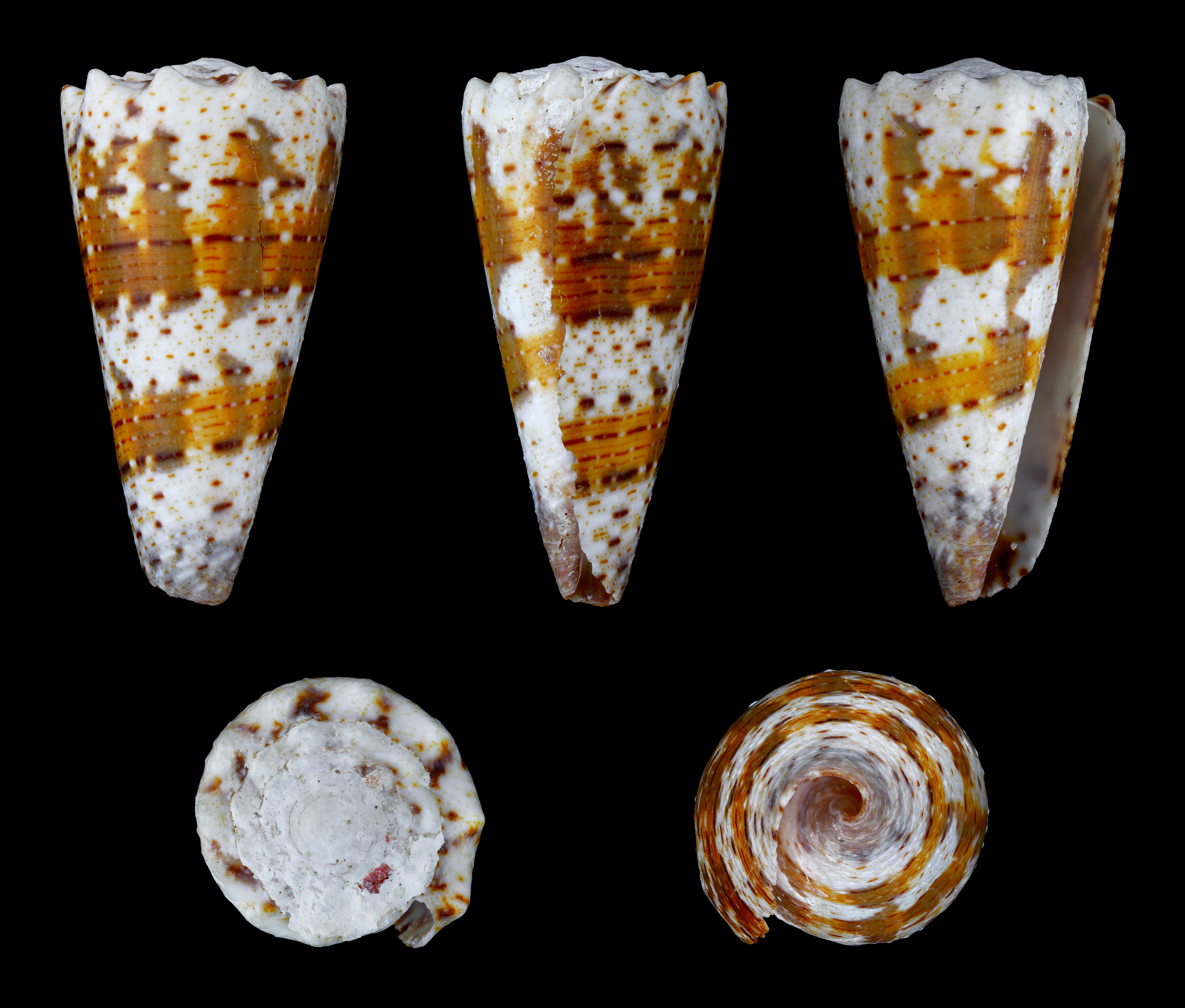
- Five views of a shell of Conus imperialis Linné,1758

Conservation status
- Least Concern (IUCN 3.1)

Scientific classification
- Kingdom: Animalia
- Phylum: Mollusca
- Class: Gastropoda
- Subclass: Caenogastropoda
- Order: Neogastropoda
- Superfamily: Conoidea
- Family: Conidae
- Genus: Conus
- Species: C. imperialis

Binomial name
- Conus imperialis Linnaeus, 1758

Synonyms
- Conus (Stephanoconus) imperialis Linnaeus, 1758 · accepted, alternate representation; Conus compactus Wils, 1970; Conus coronaducalis Röding, 1798; Conus dautzenbergi Fenaux, 1942; Conus douvillei Fenaux, 1942; Conus flavescens Barros e Cunha, 1933 (invalid, junior homonym of Conus flavescens G. B. Sowerby I, 1834); Conus fuscatus Born, 1778; Conus fuscatus dautzenbergi Fenaux, 1942; Conus imperialis compactus Wils, 1970; Conus imperialis flavescens Barros e Cunha, 1933; Conus imperialis nigrescens Barros e Cunha, 1933; Conus nigrescens Barros e Cunha, 1933 (invalid, junior homonym of Conus nigrescens G. B. Sowerby II, 1860 ); Conus regius Röding, 1798 (invalid, junior homonym of Conus regius Gmelin, 1791); Conus viridulus Lamarck, 1810; Cucullus coronaducalis Röding, 1798; Cucullus imperialis Röding, 1798; Cucullus regius Röding, 1798; Rhombiconus imperialis viridulus (f) Lamarck, J.B.P.A. de, 1810

= Conus imperialis =

Species of sea snail

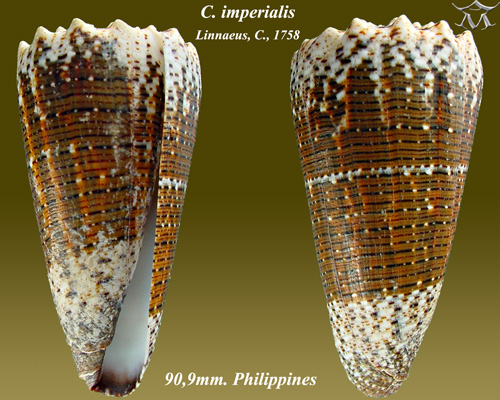
Conus imperialis Linnaeus, C., 1758

Conus imperialis, common name the imperial cone, is a species of sea snail, a marine gastropod mollusk in the family Conidae, the cone snails and their allies.

Like all species within the genus Conus, these snails are predatory and venomous. They are capable of stinging humans, therefore live ones should be handled carefully or not at all.

Subspecies

- Conus imperialis imperialis Linnaeus, 1758 (synonym: Rhombiconus imperialis imperialis (Linnaeus, C., 1758))
- Conus imperialis queketti E. A. Smith, 1906 (synonyms: Conus queketti E. A. Smith, 1906; Rhombiconus imperialis queketti (E. A. Smith, 1906) · accepted, alternate representation)

== Description ==
The size of an adult shell varies between 40 mm and 110 mm. The color of the thick shell is yellowish white or cream, with numerous interrupted revolving lines and spots of dark brown and two irregular and wider light brown bands. In the synonym Conus fuscatus, the light brown coloring extends in clouds and irregular markings over the surface, so that the bands can scarcely be defined. The shell has a flat but nodular spire and shoulders.

== Distribution ==
This species occurs in the Indian Ocean off Aldabra, Madagascar, the Mascarene Basin and Mauritius; in the entire Pacific Ocean; off Australia (the Northern Territory, Queensland and Western Australia)

== Gallery ==
Below are several color forms:

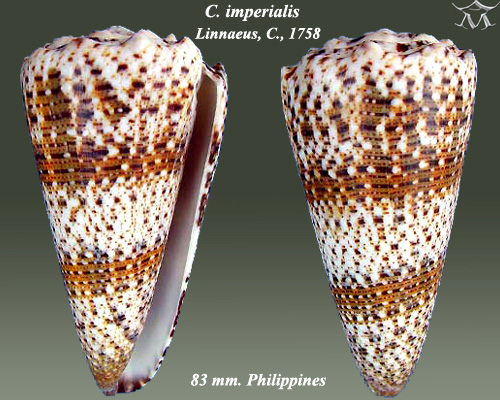
Conus imperialis Linnaeus, C., 1758

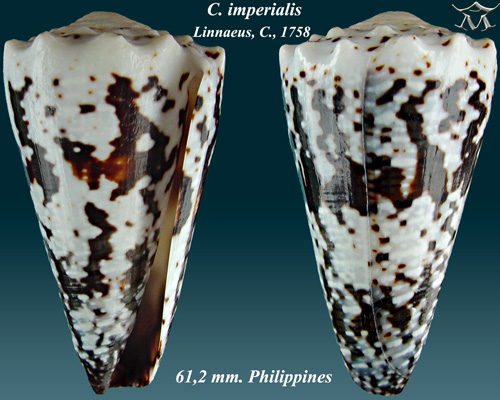
Conus imperialis Linnaeus, C., 1758

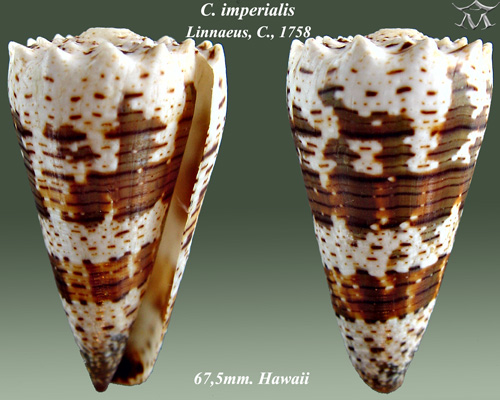
Conus imperialis Linnaeus, C., 1758

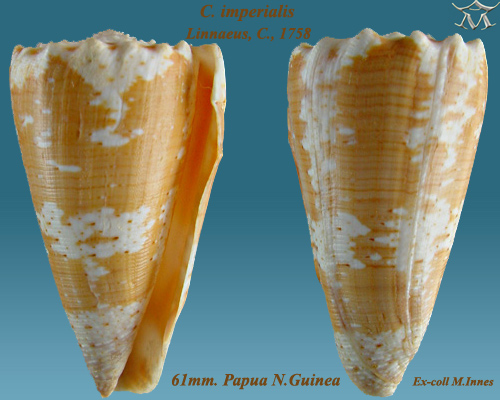
Conus imperialis Linnaeus, C., 1758

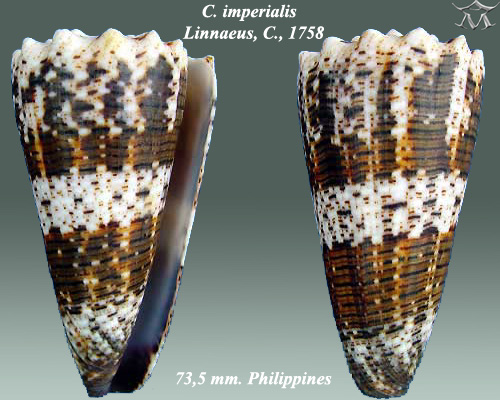
Conus imperialis Linnaeus, C., 1758
