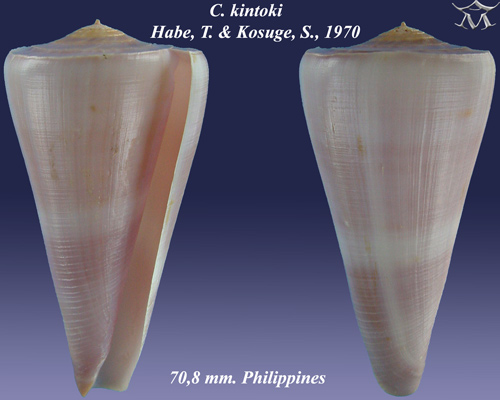
- Apertural and abapertural views of shell of Conus kintoki Habe, T. & Kosuge, S., 1970
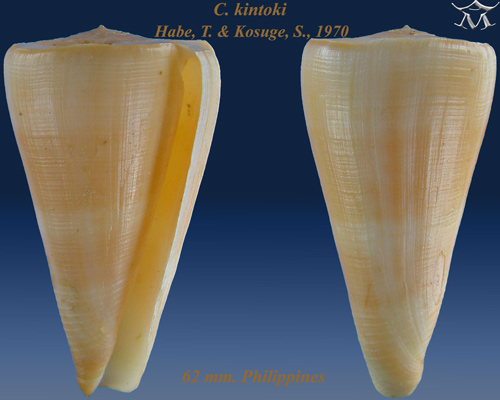

Conservation status
- Least Concern (IUCN 3.1)

Scientific classification
- Kingdom: Animalia
- Phylum: Mollusca
- Class: Gastropoda
- Subclass: Caenogastropoda
- Order: Neogastropoda
- Superfamily: Conoidea
- Family: Conidae
- Genus: Conus
- Species: C. kintoki

Binomial name
- Conus kintoki Habe & Kosuge, 1970

Synonyms
- Conus Virgiconus kintoki Habe & Kosuge, 1970; Conus kintoki Coomans & Moolenbeek, 1982; Virgiconus kintoki (Habe & Kosuge, 1970)

= Conus kintoki =

Species of sea snail

Conus kintoki is a species of sea snail, a marine gastropod mollusk in the family Conidae, the cone snails and their allies.

Like all species within the genus Conus, these snails are predatory and venomous. They are capable of stinging humans, therefore live ones should be handled carefully or not at all.

== Description ==
The size of the shell varies between 45 mm and 116 mm.

== Distribution ==
This marine species occurs off the Philippines and in the South China Sea.

== Gallery ==
Below are several color forms:

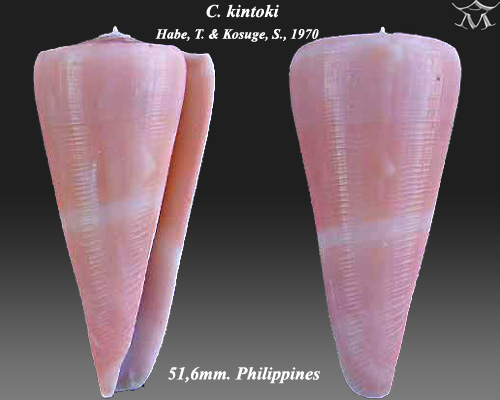
Conus kintoki Habe, T. & Kosuge, S., 1970

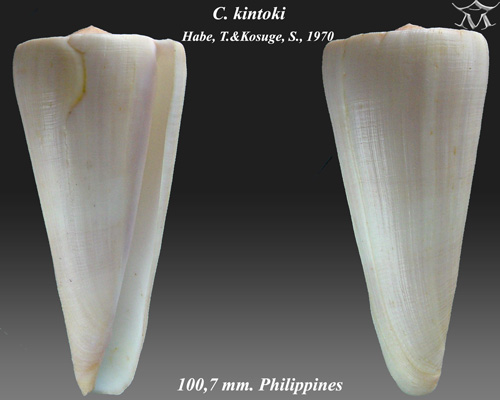
Conus kintoki Habe, T. & Kosuge, S., 1970

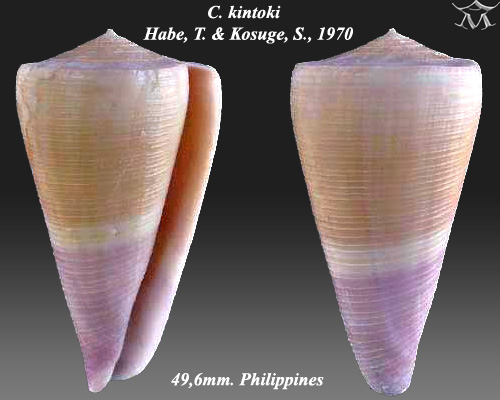
Conus kintoki Habe, T. & Kosuge, S., 1970

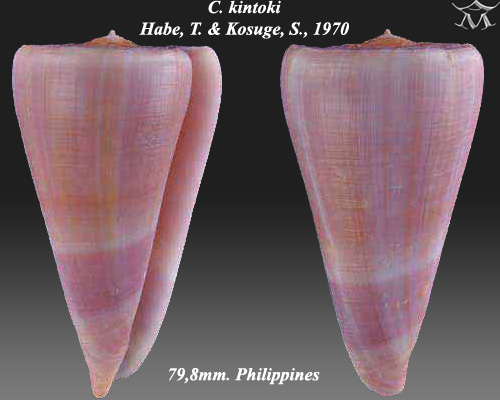
Conus kintoki Habe, T. & Kosuge, S., 1970
