= Conus tethys =

Scientific classification
- Kingdom: Animalia
- Phylum: Mollusca
- Class: Gastropoda
- Subclass: Caenogastropoda
- Order: Neogastropoda
- Superfamily: Conoidea
- Family: Conidae
- Genus: Conus
- Species: C. tethys

Binomial name
- Conus tethys (Petuch & Sargent, 2011)

Synonyms
- Conus (Virgiconus) tethys (Petuch & Sargent, 2011) · accepted, alternate representation; Virgiconus tethys Petuch & Sargent, 2011 (original combination)

Species of sea snail

Conus tethys is a species of sea snail, a marine gastropod mollusk in the family Conidae, the cone snails and their allies.

Like all species within the genus Conus, these snails are predatory and venomous. They are capable of stinging humans, therefore live ones should be handled carefully or not at all.

== Description ==
The size of the shell attains 85 mm.

== Distribution ==
This marine species occurs off the Sulu Archipelago, the Philippines.
