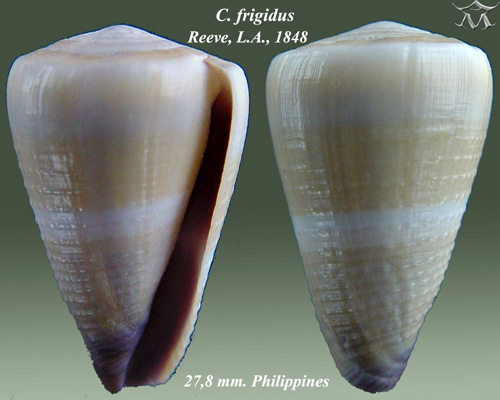
- Apertural and abapertural views of shell of Conus frigidus Reeve, L.A., 1848
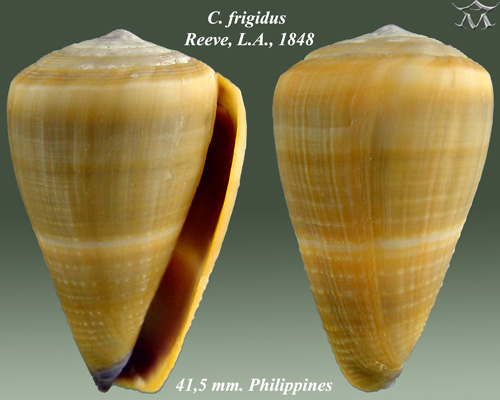

Conservation status
- Least Concern (IUCN 3.1)

Scientific classification
- Kingdom: Animalia
- Phylum: Mollusca
- Class: Gastropoda
- Subclass: Caenogastropoda
- Order: Neogastropoda
- Superfamily: Conoidea
- Family: Conidae
- Genus: Conus
- Species: C. frigidus

Binomial name
- Conus frigidus Reeve, 1848

Synonyms
- Conus (Virgiconus) frigidus Reeve, 1848 accepted, alternate representation; Conus maltzanianus Weinkauff, 1873; Virgiconus frigidus (Reeve, 1848)

= Conus frigidus =

Species of sea snail

Conus frigidus, common name the frigid cone, is a species of sea snail, a marine gastropod mollusk in the family Conidae, the cone snails and their allies.

Like all species within the genus Conus, these snails are predatory and venomous. They are capable of stinging humans, therefore live ones should be handled carefully or not at all.

== Description ==
Shell size 20-25 mm. The color of the shell pale straw-color, violaceous at the base and the apex. The spire is three-grooved and shows revolving striae on the lower part of the body whorl, which become granulose towards the base.

== Distribution ==
This species occurs in the Red Sea and in the Indian Ocean off East Africa; in the Pacific Ocean and off Australia (the Northern Territory, Queensland and Western Australia)
