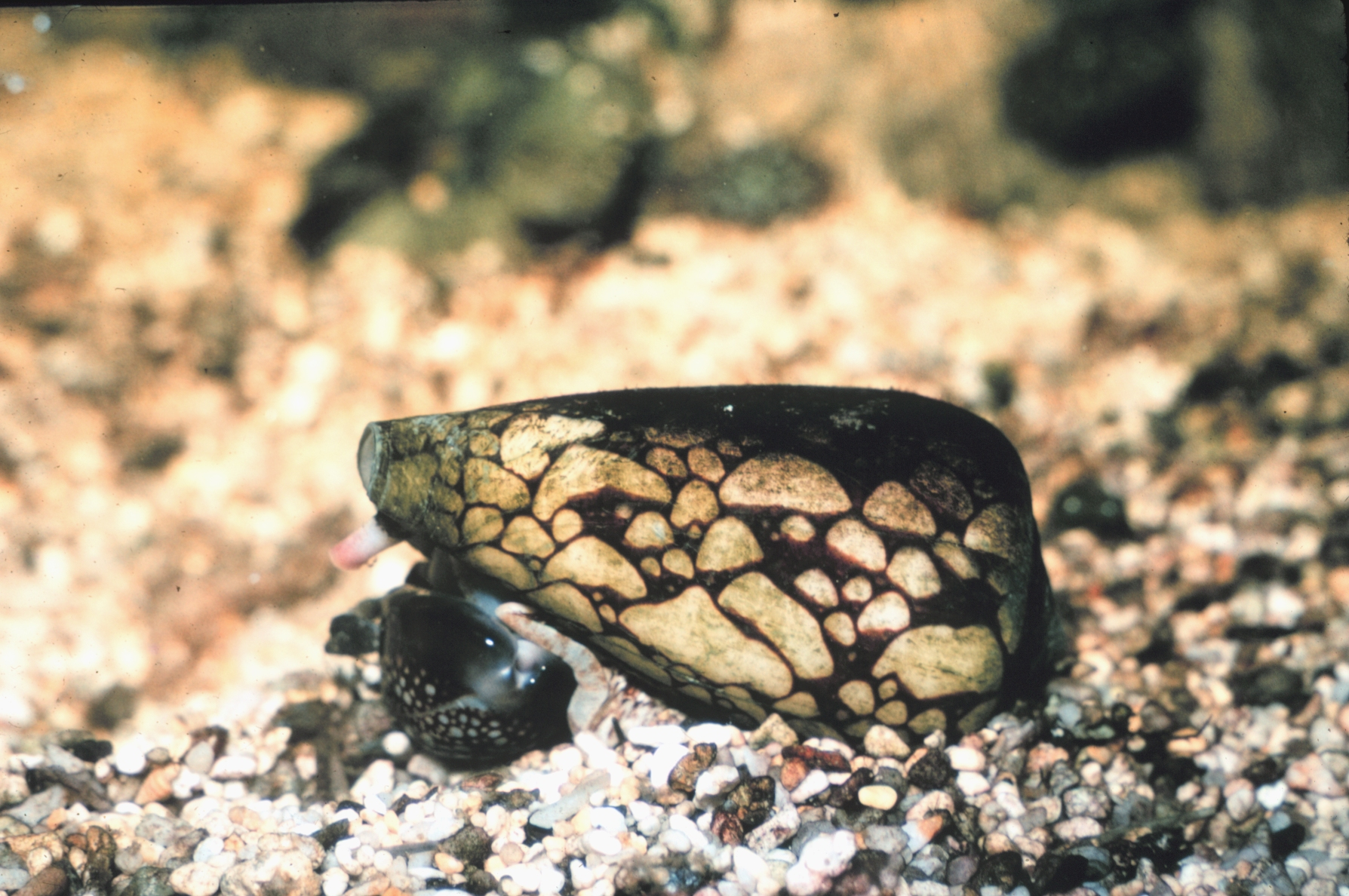
- A live Conus marmoreus feeding on Monetaria caputserpentis.

Conservation status
- Least Concern (IUCN 3.1)

Scientific classification
- Kingdom: Animalia
- Phylum: Mollusca
- Class: Gastropoda
- Subclass: Caenogastropoda
- Order: Neogastropoda
- Superfamily: Conoidea
- Family: Conidae
- Genus: Conus
- Species: C. marmoreus

Binomial name
- Conus marmoreus Linnaeus, 1758

Synonyms
- List: Conus (Conus) marmoreus Linnaeus, 1758 · accepted, alternate representation; Conus crosseanus Bernardi, 1861; Conus crosseanus var. lineata Crosse, 1878 (invalid: junior homonym of Conus lineatus Hwass in Bruguière, 1792); Conus maculatus Perry, 1811; Conus marmoreus var. granulatus G.B. Sowerby I, 1839 (invalid: junior homonym of Conus granulatus Linnaeus, 1758); Conus pseudomarmoreus Crosse, 1875; Conus (Conus) proarchithalassus Röding, P.F., 1798; Conus suffusus Sowerby II, 1870; Conus suffusus var. noumeensis Crosse, 1872; Cucullus proarchithalassus Röding, 1798

= Conus marmoreus =

Species of sea snail

Conus marmoreus (common name the marbled cone) is a species of predatory sea snail, a marine gastropod mollusk in the family Conidae, the cone snails, cone shells or cones. It is the type species for the genus Conus, which is the type genus of the family. This is a species which is believed to feed mostly on marine mollusks including other cone snails. This snail is venomous, like all cone snails.

The subspecies: Conus marmoreus bandanus Hwass in Bruguière, 1792 is a synonym of Conus bandanus Hwass in Bruguière, 1792

== Distribution ==
This species occurs in the Indian Ocean off Chagos and Madagascar, in the Bay of Bengal off India; in the western part of the Pacific Ocean to Fiji and the Marshall Islands; off Australia (Northern Territory, Queensland, Western Australia).

== Shell description ==
The size of an adult shell can vary between 30–150 millimetres (1.2–5.9 in). The flattish spire is nodular. The outer lip flares towards posterior. In this species, the distinctive, reticulated colour pattern can range from black with white dots, to orange with white reticulations, so arranged as to expose the white in rounded triangular large spots. The aperture is white or light pink.

== In art ==
In 1650, Rembrandt portrayed this cone in an etching as "De schelp" ("The shell").

== Gallery ==
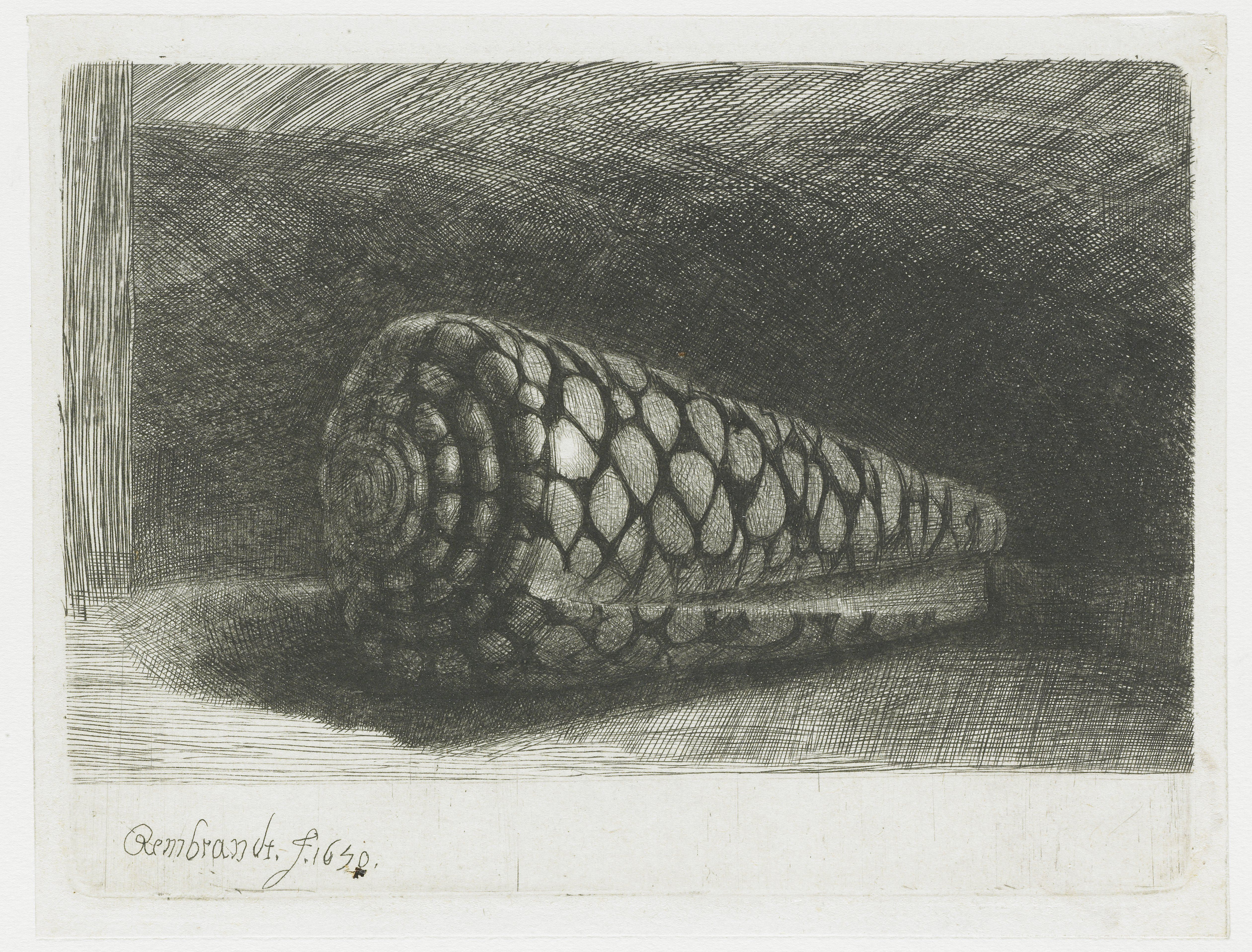
"De schelp" ("The shell"), etching by Rembrandt

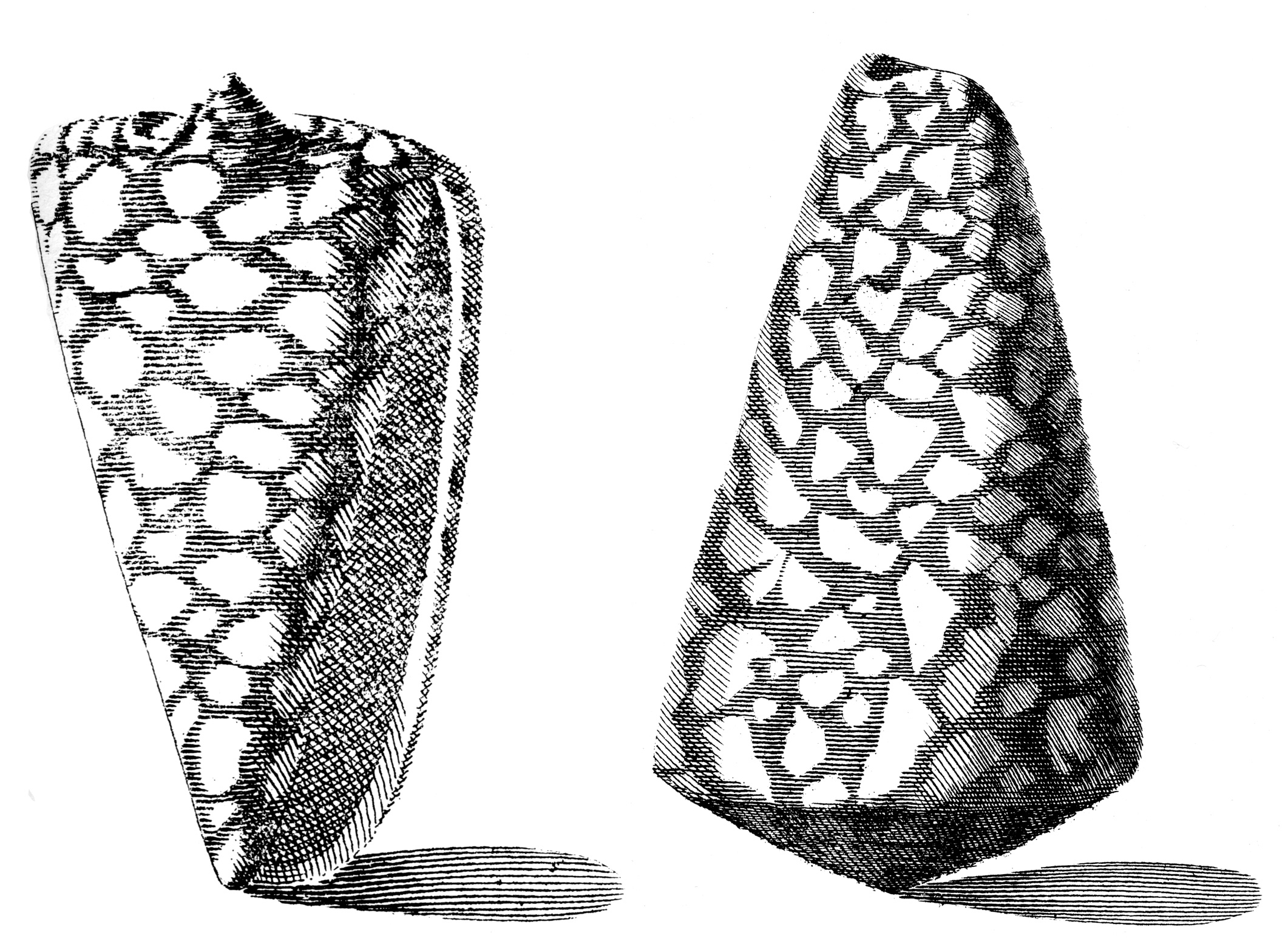
The shell of Conus marmoreus from Index Testarum Conchyliorum (1742) by Niccolò Gualtieri

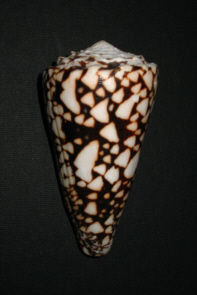
A shell of Conus marmoreus after it has been cleaned

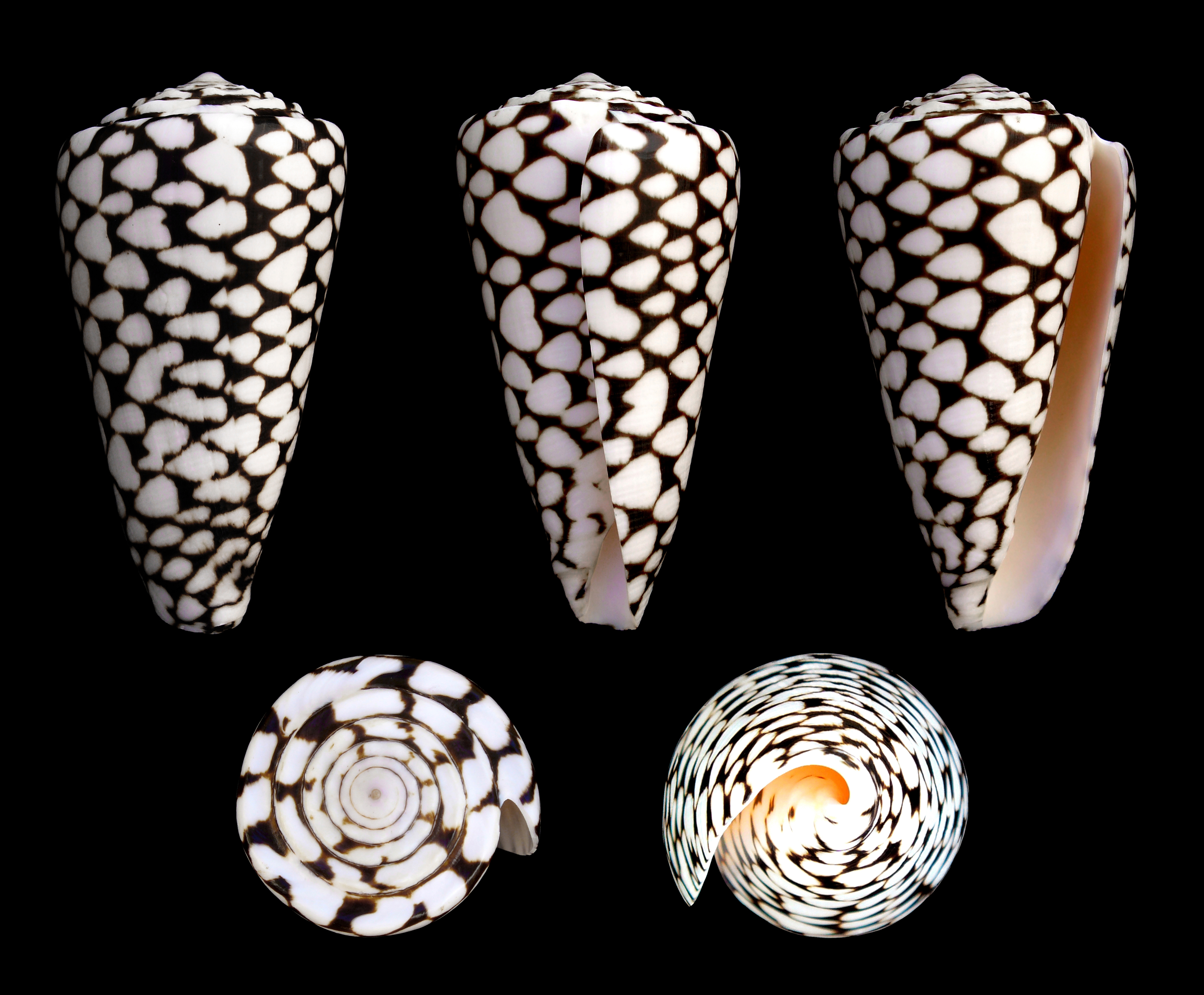
The shell of Conus marmoreus in various aspects

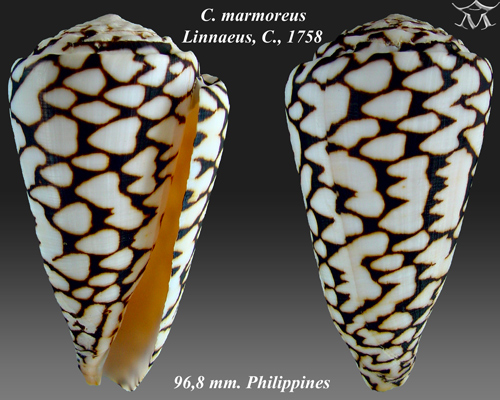
Conus marmoreus Linnaeus, C., 1758

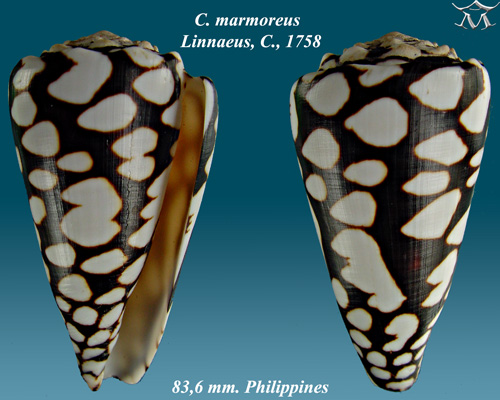
Conus marmoreus Linnaeus, C., 1758

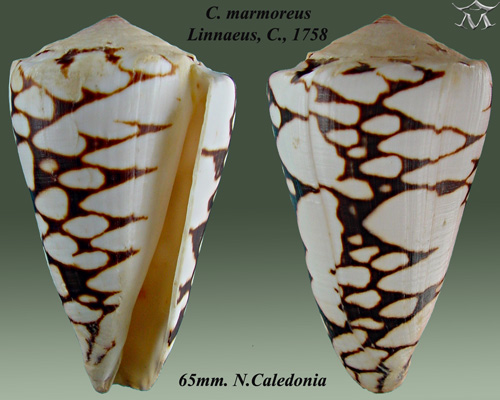
Conus marmoreus Linnaeus, C., 1758

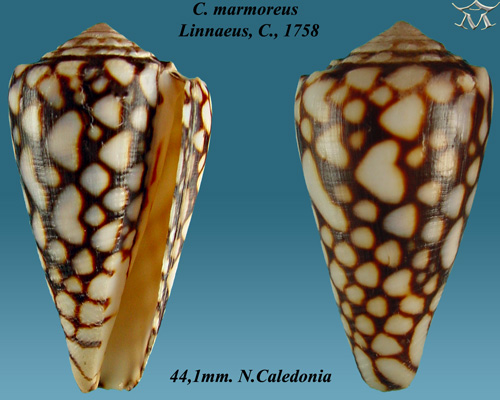
Conus marmoreus Linnaeus, C., 1758

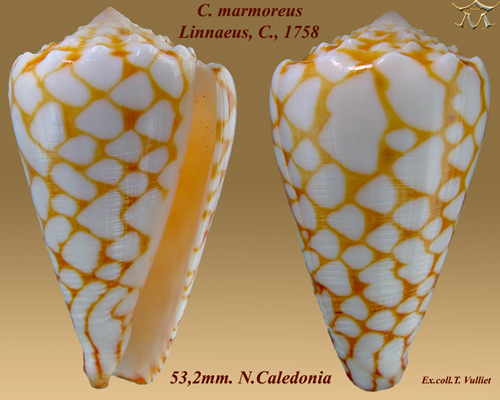
Conus marmoreus Linnaeus, C., 1758

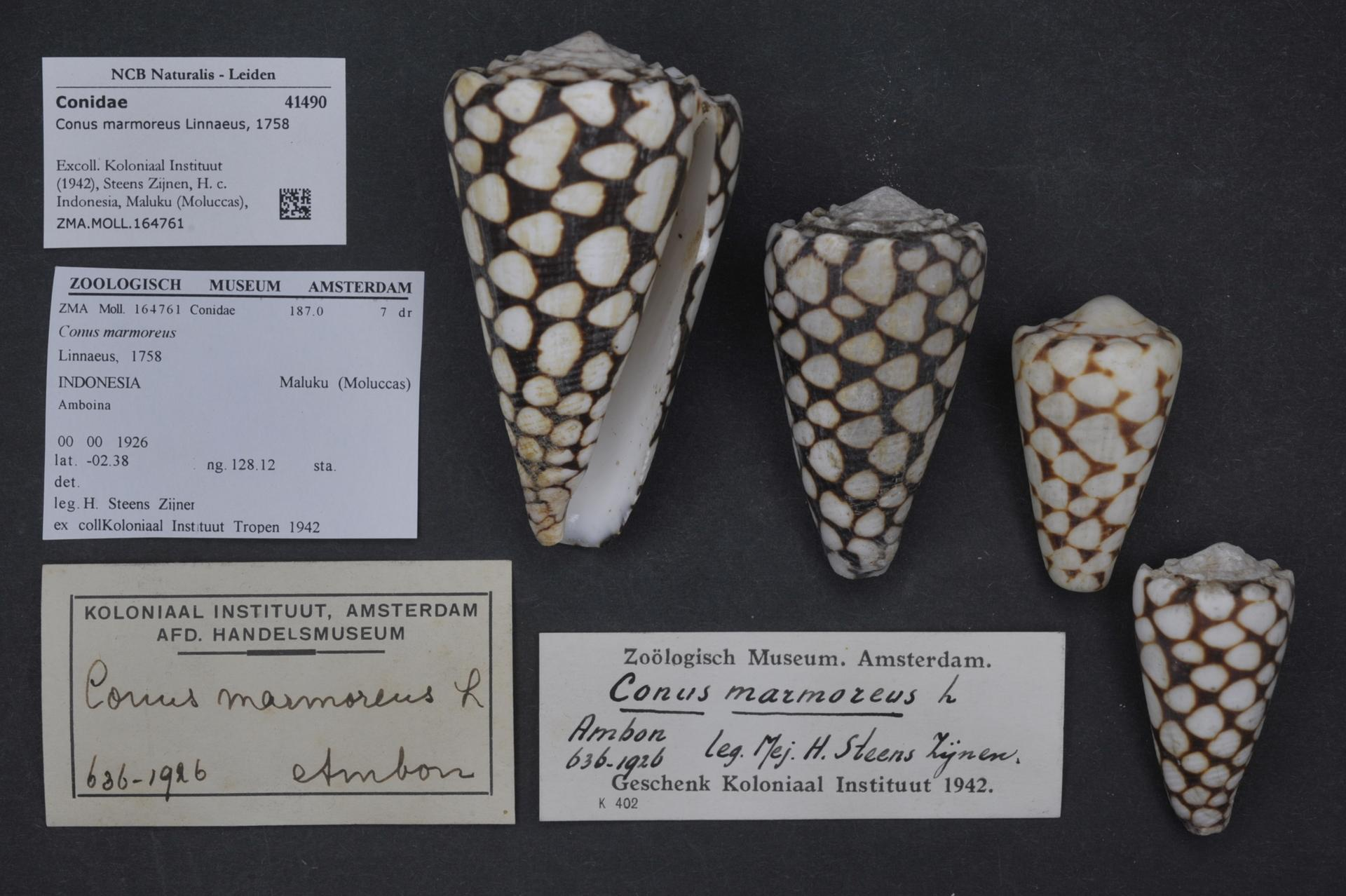
Conus marmoreus Linnaeus, 1758, museum specimens with species tags
