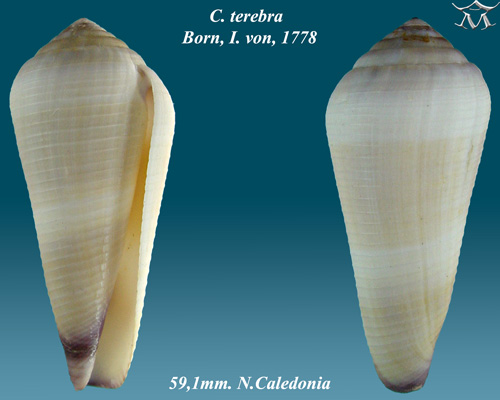
- Apertural and abapertural views of shell of Conus terebra Born, I. von, 1778
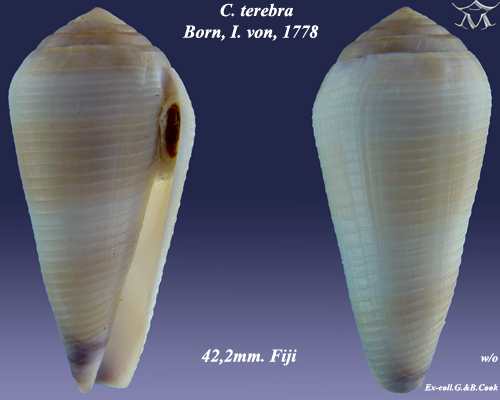

Conservation status
- Least Concern (IUCN 3.1)

Scientific classification
- Kingdom: Animalia
- Phylum: Mollusca
- Class: Gastropoda
- Subclass: Caenogastropoda
- Order: Neogastropoda
- Superfamily: Conoidea
- Family: Conidae
- Genus: Conus
- Species: C. terebra

Binomial name
- Conus terebra Born, 1778

Synonyms
- Conus (Virgiconus) terebra Born, 1778 · accepted, alternate representation; Conus coelebs Hinds, 1843; Conus fusus Gmelin, 1791; Conus terebellum Gmelin, 1791 (invalid: junior homonym of Conus terebellum Linnaeus, 1758); Conus thomasi G. B. Sowerby III, 1881; Cucullus albeolus Röding, 1798; Gastridium terebra Salvat, B. & Rives, C. 1975; Hermes terebra (Born, 1779); Virgiconus terebra (Born, 1778)

= Conus terebra =

Species of sea snail

Conus terebra is a species of sea snail, a marine gastropod mollusk in the family Conidae, the cone snails and their allies.

Like all species within the genus Conus, these snails are predatory and venomous. They are capable of stinging humans, therefore live ones should be handled carefully or not at all.

== Description ==
The length of the shell varies between 43 mm and 100 mm. The shell is striated throughout. Its color is pale yellowish or ash-color, indistinctly two-banded, often somewhat tinged with violet at the base. The aperture is white or slightly violaceous.

== Distribution ==
This marine species occurs in the Red Sea, in the tropical Indo-Pacific and off Australia (Northern Territory, Queensland and Western Australia).
