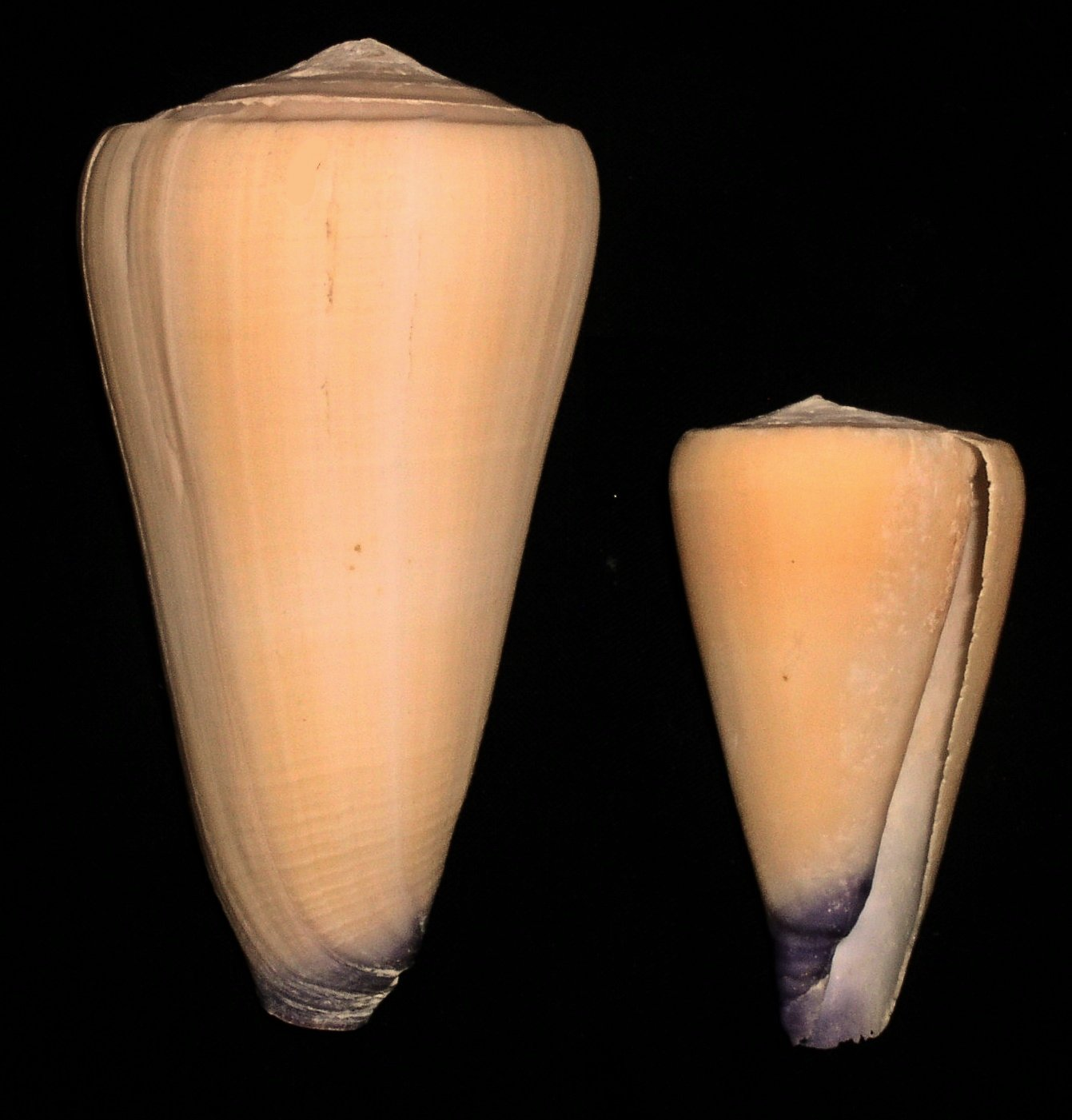
- Abapertural (left) and apertural (right) views of the shell of Conus virgo

Conservation status
- Least Concern (IUCN 3.1)

Scientific classification
- Kingdom: Animalia
- Phylum: Mollusca
- Class: Gastropoda
- Subclass: Caenogastropoda
- Order: Neogastropoda
- Superfamily: Conoidea
- Family: Conidae
- Genus: Conus
- Species: C. virgo

Binomial name
- Conus virgo Linnaeus, 1758

Synonyms
- Conus (Virgiconus) virgo Linnaeus, 1758 · accepted, alternate representation; Conus flavocinctus Link, 1807 (nomen dubium); Conus virgo var. alba Spalowsky, 1795; Virgiconus virgo (Linnaeus, 1758)

= Conus virgo =

Species of sea snail

Conus virgo is a species of sea snail, a marine gastropod mollusk in the family Conidae, the cone snails and their allies.

These snails are predatory and venomous. They are capable of stinging humans, therefore live ones should be handled carefully or not at all.

Varieties

- Conus virgo var. alba Spalowsky, 1795: synonym of Conus virgo Linnaeus, 1758
- Conus virgo var. fasciata Menke, 1828: synonym of Conus lividus Hwass in Bruguière, 1792

== Description ==
The size of the shell varies between 50 mm and 151 mm. The solid shell is rounded below the shoulder-angle. The spire is flatly convex, slightly striate throughout, more distinctly at the base. The color of the shell is pale yellowish brown, tinged with violet at the base.

== Distribution ==
This marine species occurs in the Red Sea and in the tropical Indo-West Pacific off Tanzania, Madagascar, Aldabra, Chagos, the Mascarene Islands; India, the Philippines and Australia (Northern Territory, Queensland, Western Australia).
