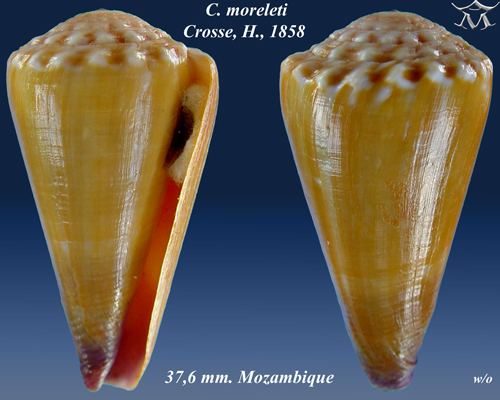
- Apertural and abapertural views of shell of Conus moreleti Crosse, H., 1858
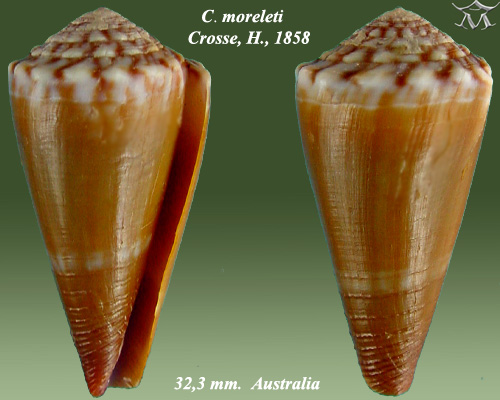

Conservation status
- Least Concern (IUCN 3.1)

Scientific classification
- Kingdom: Animalia
- Phylum: Mollusca
- Class: Gastropoda
- Subclass: Caenogastropoda
- Order: Neogastropoda
- Superfamily: Conoidea
- Family: Conidae
- Genus: Conus
- Species: C. moreleti

Binomial name
- Conus moreleti Crosse, 1858

Synonyms
- Conus (Virgiconus) moreleti Crosse, 1858 · accepted, alternate representation; Conus elongatus Reeve, 1843; Conus oblitus Reeve, 1849 (junior homonym of Conus oblitus Michelotti, 1847); Virgiconus moreleti (Crosse, 1858)

= Conus moreleti =

Species of sea snail

Conus moreleti is a species of sea snail, a marine gastropod mollusk in the family Conidae, the cone snails and their allies.

Like all species within the genus Conus, these snails are predatory and venomous. They are capable of stinging humans, therefore live ones should be handled carefully or not at all.

== Description ==
The size of the shell varies between 25 mm and 61 mm. The narrow shell contains a convexly depressed, tuberculated spire. The body whorl is striate below. Its color is yellowish olivaceous, indistinctly white-banded in the middle. The tubercles, and a band below the shoulder is white. The base of the shell and the aperture is violaceous.

== Distribution ==
This species occurs in the Indian Ocean off the Mascarene Basin and off Eastern Africa; off French Polynesia and Hawaii; off Australia (Northern Territory, Queensland).
