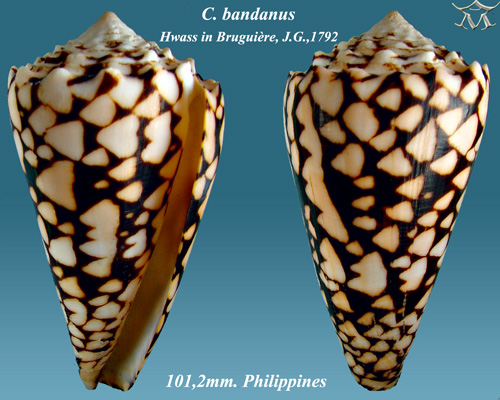
- Apertural and abapertural views of shell of Conus bandanus Hwass in Bruguière, J.G., 1792
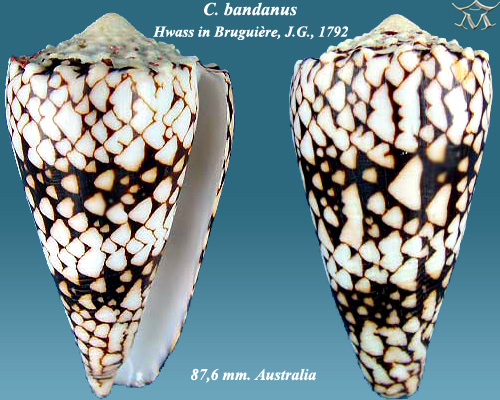

Conservation status
- Least Concern (IUCN 3.1)

Scientific classification
- Kingdom: Animalia
- Phylum: Mollusca
- Class: Gastropoda
- Subclass: Caenogastropoda
- Order: Neogastropoda
- Superfamily: Conoidea
- Family: Conidae
- Genus: Conus
- Species: C. bandanus

Binomial name
- Conus bandanus Hwass in Bruguière, 1792

Synonyms
- Conus (Conus) bandanus Hwass in Bruguière, 1792 · accepted, alternate representation; Conus marmoreus bandanus Hwass in Bruguière, 1792; Conus nigrescens G. B. Sowerby II, 1859; Conus vidua f. mozoii Melvin & Melvin, 1980 (unavailable name: published as a form after 1960); Cucullus equestris Röding, 1798; Cucullus torquatus Röding, 1798

= Conus bandanus =

Species of sea snail

Conus bandanus, common name the banded marble cone, is a species of sea snail, a marine gastropod mollusk in the family Conidae, the cone snails and their allies.

Like all species within the genus Conus, these snails are predatory and venomous. They are capable of stinging humans, therefore live ones should be handled carefully or not at all.

== Description ==
The size of the shell varies between 45 mm and 150 mm. The color of the shell is white or light pink-white, with chocolate or chestnut reticulations, so arranged as to expose the crowded white in rounded triangular large spots. The colored markings form two irregular bands. The aperture is white or light pink.

== Distribution ==
This is an Indo-Pacific species, occurring of the Mascarene Basin, Mauritius and Tanzania.
