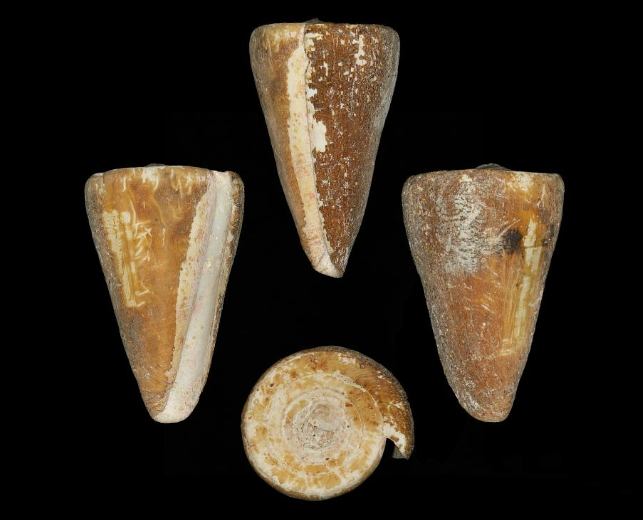
- Shell and protoconch of Conus spiceri (holotype at the Smithsonian Institution)

Scientific classification
- Kingdom: Animalia
- Phylum: Mollusca
- Class: Gastropoda
- Subclass: Caenogastropoda
- Order: Neogastropoda
- Superfamily: Conoidea
- Family: Conidae
- Genus: Conus
- Species: C. spiceri

Binomial name
- Conus spiceri Bartsch & Rehder, 1943

Synonyms
- Conus (Virgiconus) spiceri Bartsch & Rehder, 1943 · accepted, alternate representation; Conus coelinae spiceri Bartsch & Rehder, 1943; Virgiconus spiceri (Bartsch & Rehder, 1943); Virgiconus coelinae spiceri Bartsch & Rehder, 1943

= Conus spiceri =

Species of sea snail

Conus spiceri is a species of sea snail, a marine gastropod mollusk in the family Conidae, the cone snails, cone shells or cones.

These snails are predatory and venomous. They are capable of stinging humans.

== Description ==
The size of the shell varies between 45 mm and 152 mm.

== Distribution ==
This marine species occurs in the Pacific Ocean off Hawaii and Midway.
