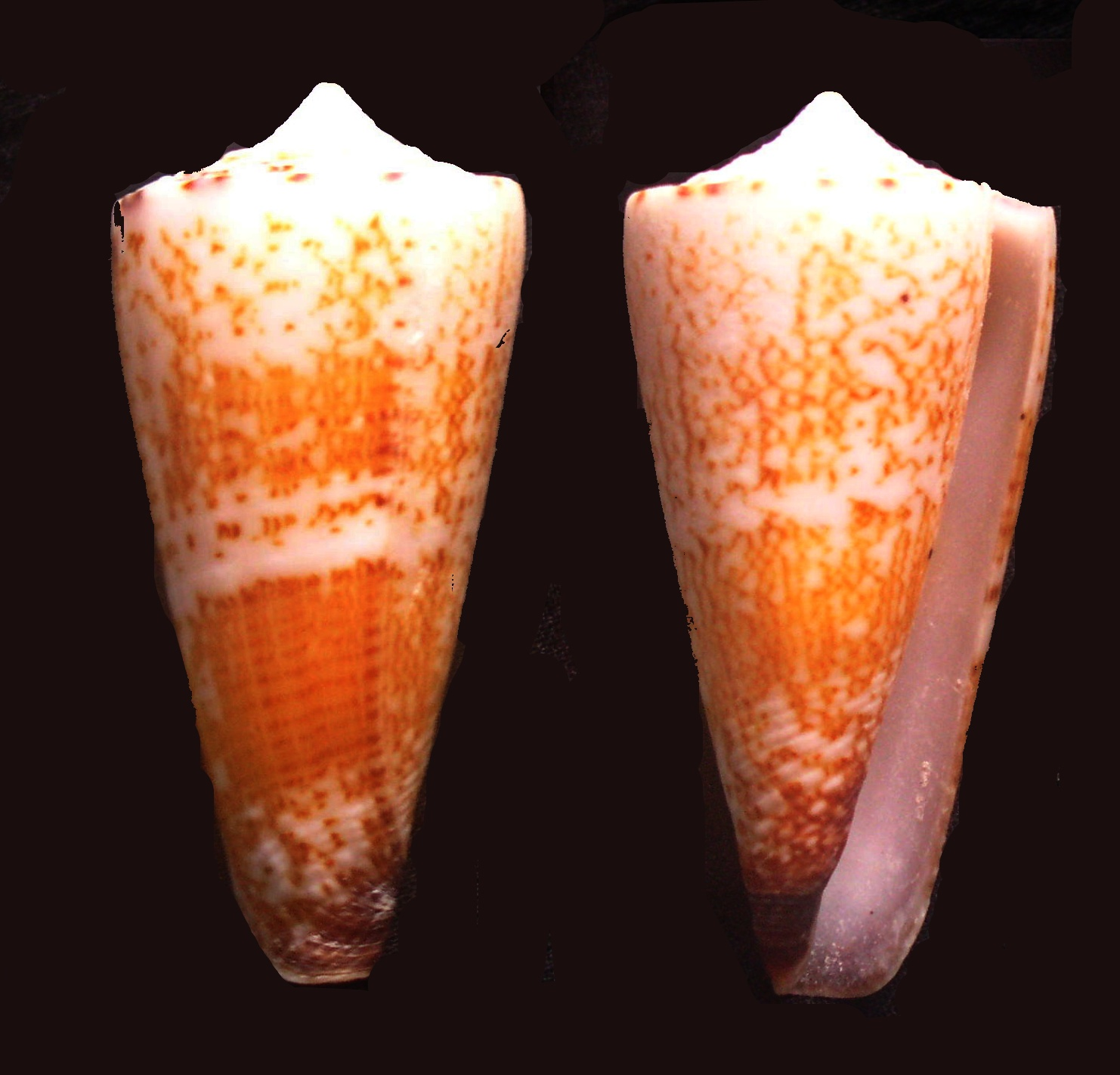

Conservation status
- Least Concern (IUCN 3.1)

Scientific classification
- Kingdom: Animalia
- Phylum: Mollusca
- Class: Gastropoda
- Subclass: Caenogastropoda
- Order: Neogastropoda
- Superfamily: Conoidea
- Family: Conidae
- Genus: Conus
- Species: C. thalassiarchus

Binomial name
- Conus thalassiarchus G. B. Sowerby I, 1834

Synonyms
- Conus (Calibanus) thalassiarchus G. B. Sowerby I, 1834 · accepted, alternate representation; Conus castrensis Gould, 1842; Conus mariei Jousseaume, 1899; Conus thalassiarchus f. ikatt Shikama, 1979 (unavailable name: established as a "form" after 1960); Conus thalassiarchus var. elevata Wils, 1972; Conus vidua var. azona Wils, 1972 (unavailable name: established as a variety after 1960); Conus vidua var. depriesteri Wils, 1972 (unavailable name: established as a variety after 1960); Conus vidua var. elevata Wils, 1972 (unavailable name: established as a variety after 1960); Thalassiconus thalassiarchus (G. B. Sowerby I, 1834); Virgiconus thalassiarchus (G. B. Sowerby I, 1834)

= Conus thalassiarchus =

Species of sea snail

Conus thalassiarchus, common name the bough cone, is a species of sea snail, a marine gastropod mollusk in the family Conidae, the cone snails and their allies.

Like all species within the genus Conus, these snails are predatory and venomous. They are capable of stinging humans, therefore live ones should be handled carefully or not at all.

== Description ==
The size of the shell varies between 35 mm and 115 mm. The spire is depressed and nearly smooth, with a sharp angle. The color of the shell is white, longitudinally and angularly reticulated with chestnut lines, chocolate-tinted at the base. It shows sometimes an irregular central white band covered by revolving lines of spots, and occasionally with yellowish bands above and below the latter and similarly spotted.

== Distribution ==
This marine species occurs off the Southern Philippines.

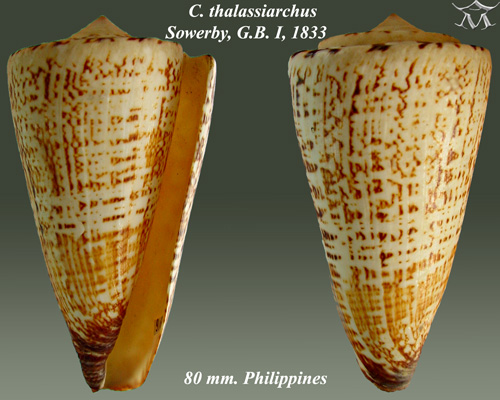
Conus thalassiarchus Sowerby, G.B. I, 1833

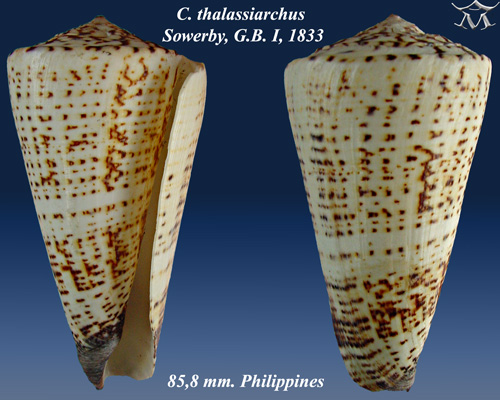
Conus thalassiarchus Sowerby, G.B. I, 1833

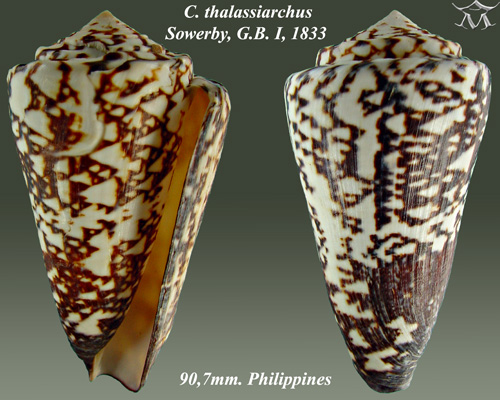
Conus thalassiarchus Sowerby, G.B. I, 1833

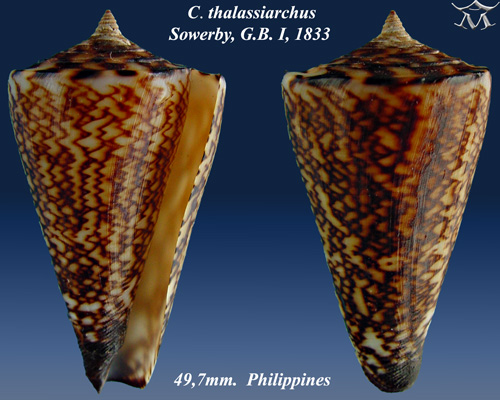
Conus thalassiarchus Sowerby, G.B. I, 1833

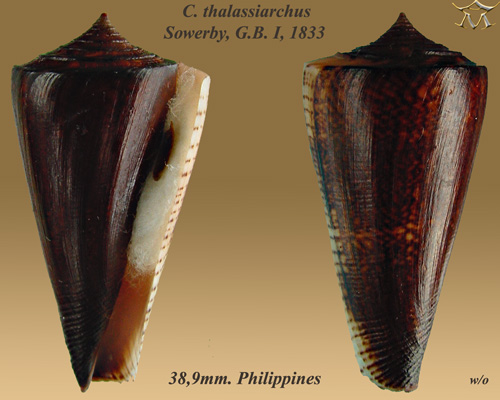
Conus thalassiarchus Sowerby, G.B. I, 1833
