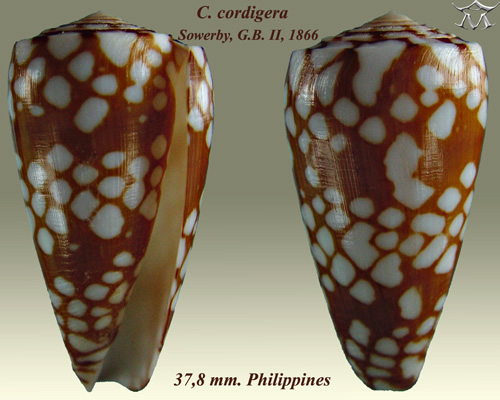
- Apertural and abapertural views of shell of Conus cordigera Sowerby, G.B. II, 1866
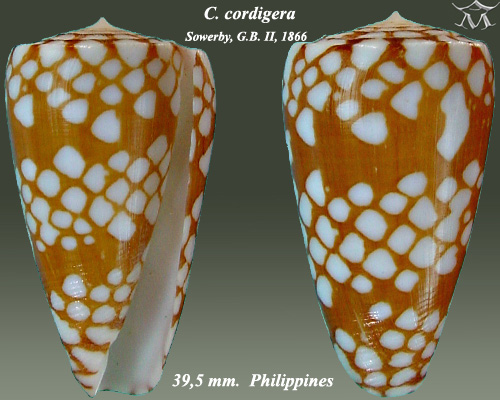

Conservation status
- Least Concern (IUCN 3.1)

Scientific classification
- Kingdom: Animalia
- Phylum: Mollusca
- Class: Gastropoda
- Subclass: Caenogastropoda
- Order: Neogastropoda
- Superfamily: Conoidea
- Family: Conidae
- Genus: Conus
- Species: C. cordigera

Binomial name
- Conus cordigera G. B. Sowerby II, 1866

Synonyms
- Conus (Eugeniconus) cordigera G. B. Sowerby II, 1866 · accepted, alternate representation; Conus bitleri da Motta, 1984; Conus nobilis bitleri da Motta, 1984; Conus nobilis cordigera G. B. Sowerby II, 1866 (original description); Eugeniconus cordigera (G. B. Sowerby II, 1866)

= Conus cordigera =

Species of sea snail

Conus cordigera is a known species of sea snail, a marine gastropod mollusk in the family Conidae, the cone snails and their allies.

Like all species within the genus Conus, these snails are predatory and venomous. They are capable of stinging humans, therefore live ones should be handled carefully or not at all.

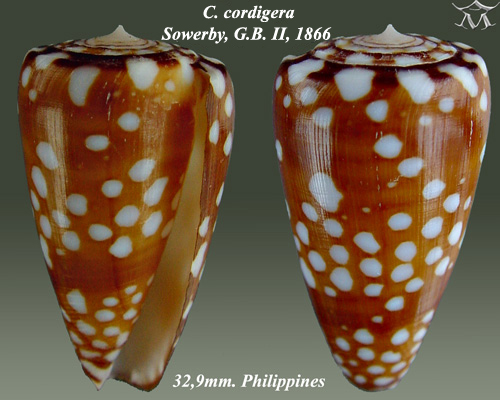
Conus cordigera Sowerby, G.B. II, 1866

== Description ==
The size of the shell varies between 30 mm and 72 mm.

== Distribution ==
This marine species occurs off the Philippines and Eastern Indonesia
