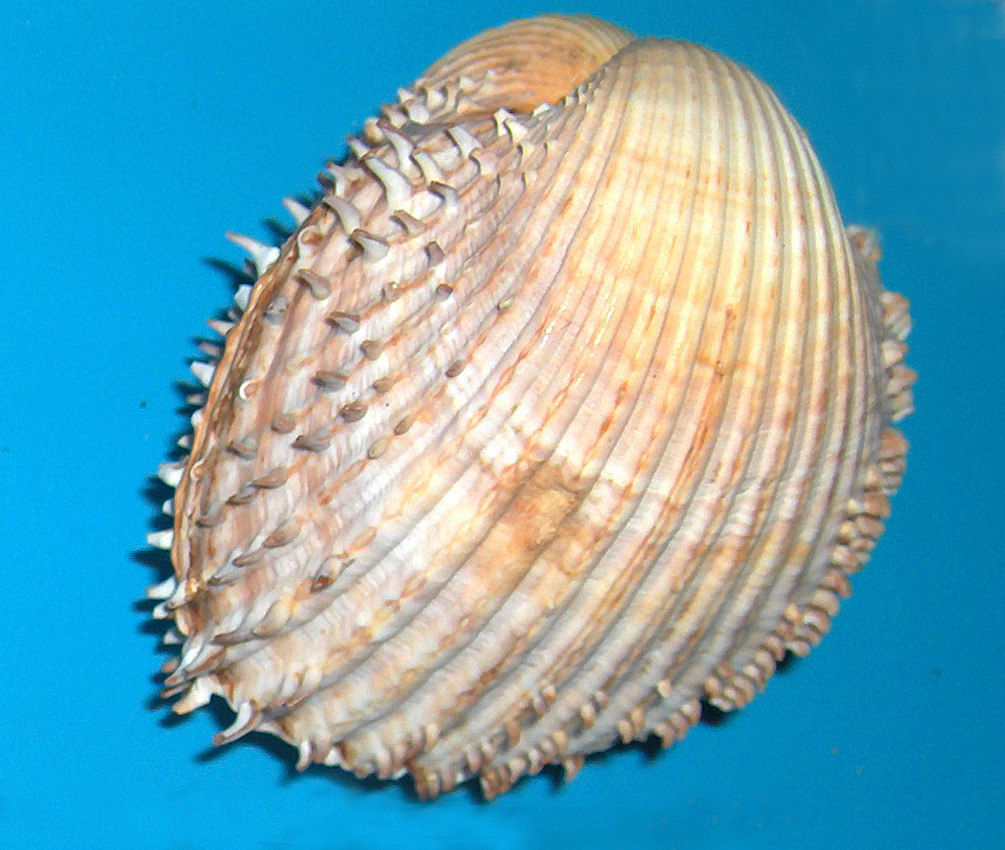
- Anthocardia aculeata, the spiny cockle

Scientific classification
- Kingdom: Animalia
- Phylum: Mollusca
- Class: Bivalvia
- Order: Cardiida
- Family: Cardiidae
- Genus: Acanthocardia; J. E. Gray, 1851

= Acanthocardia =

Acanthocardia Temporal range: Late Cretaceous–recent, 84.9–0 Ma

Genus of bivalves

Acanthocardia is a genus of saltwater clams, marine bivalve molluscs in the family Cardiidae. They are infaunal suspension feeders.

== Species ==
There are six extant species:

- Acanthocardia aculeata (Linnaeus, 1758)
- Acanthocardia deshayesii (Payraudeau, 1826)
- Acanthocardia echinata (Linnaeus, 1758)
- Acanthocardia paucicostata (Sowerby, 1834)
- Acanthocardia spinosa (Lightfoot, 1786)
- Acanthocardia tuberculata (Linnaeus, 1758)

== Gallery ==
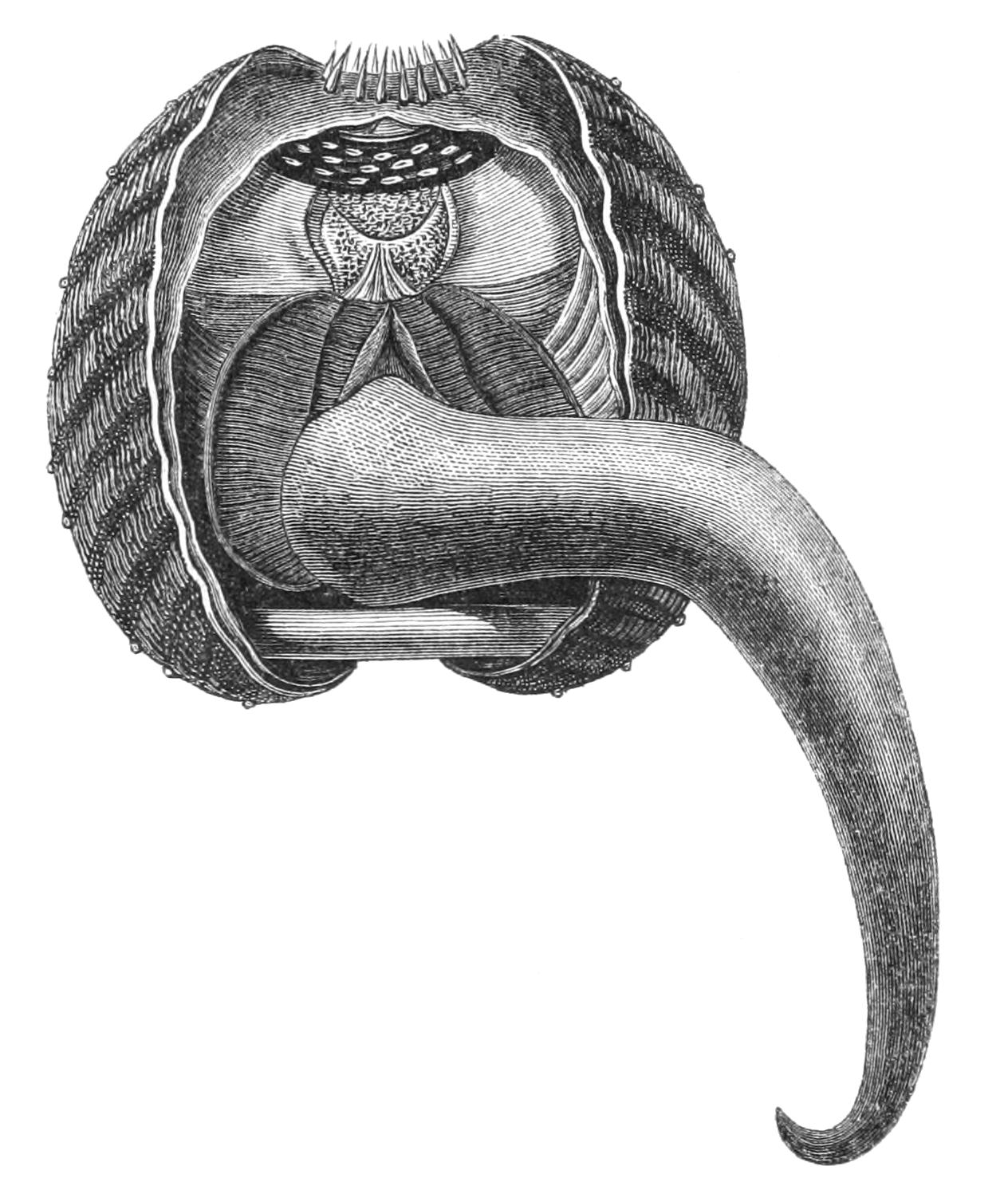
Anthocardia tuberculata. Illustration from Natural History: Mollusca (1854), p. 271

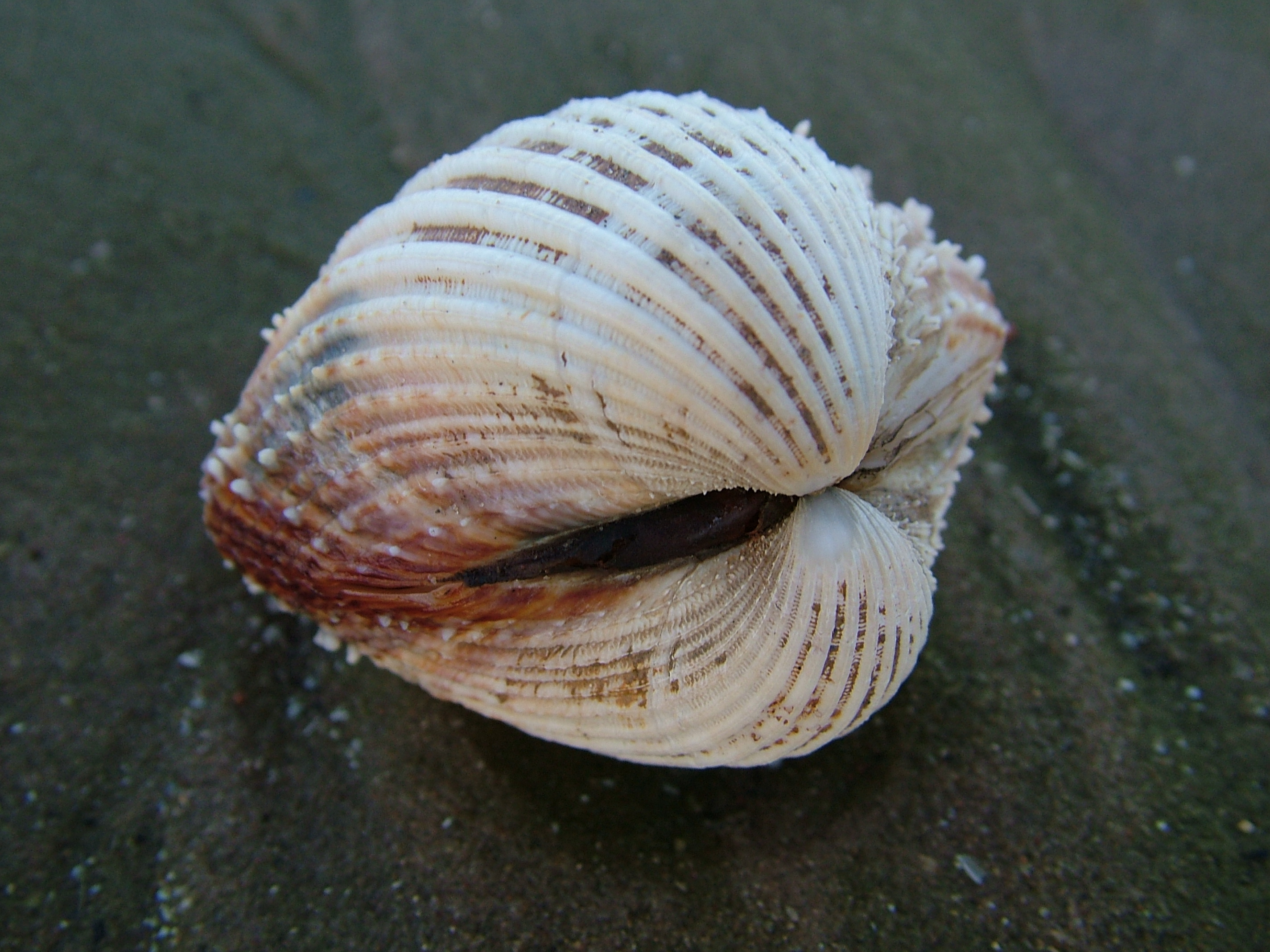
Acanthocardia echinata. Shell on sand.

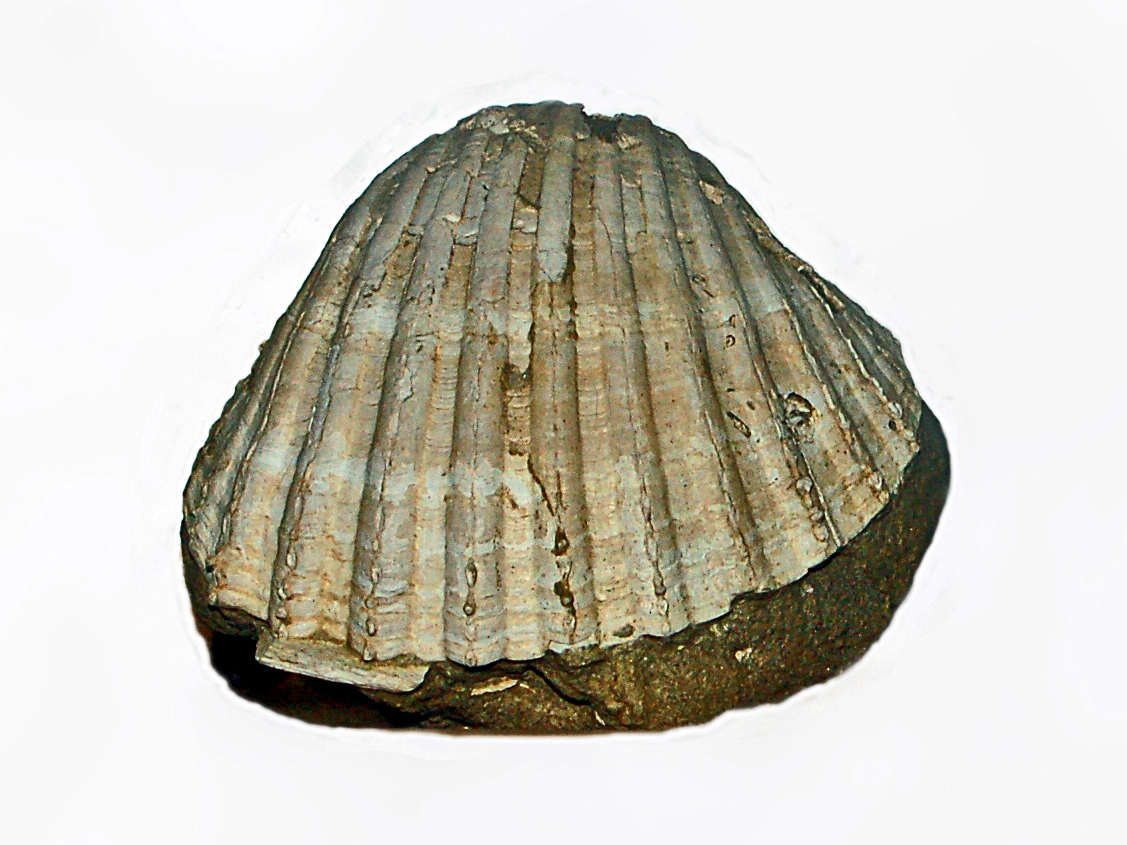
Fossil of Acanthocardia tuberculata, Pliocene, Asti (Italy)
