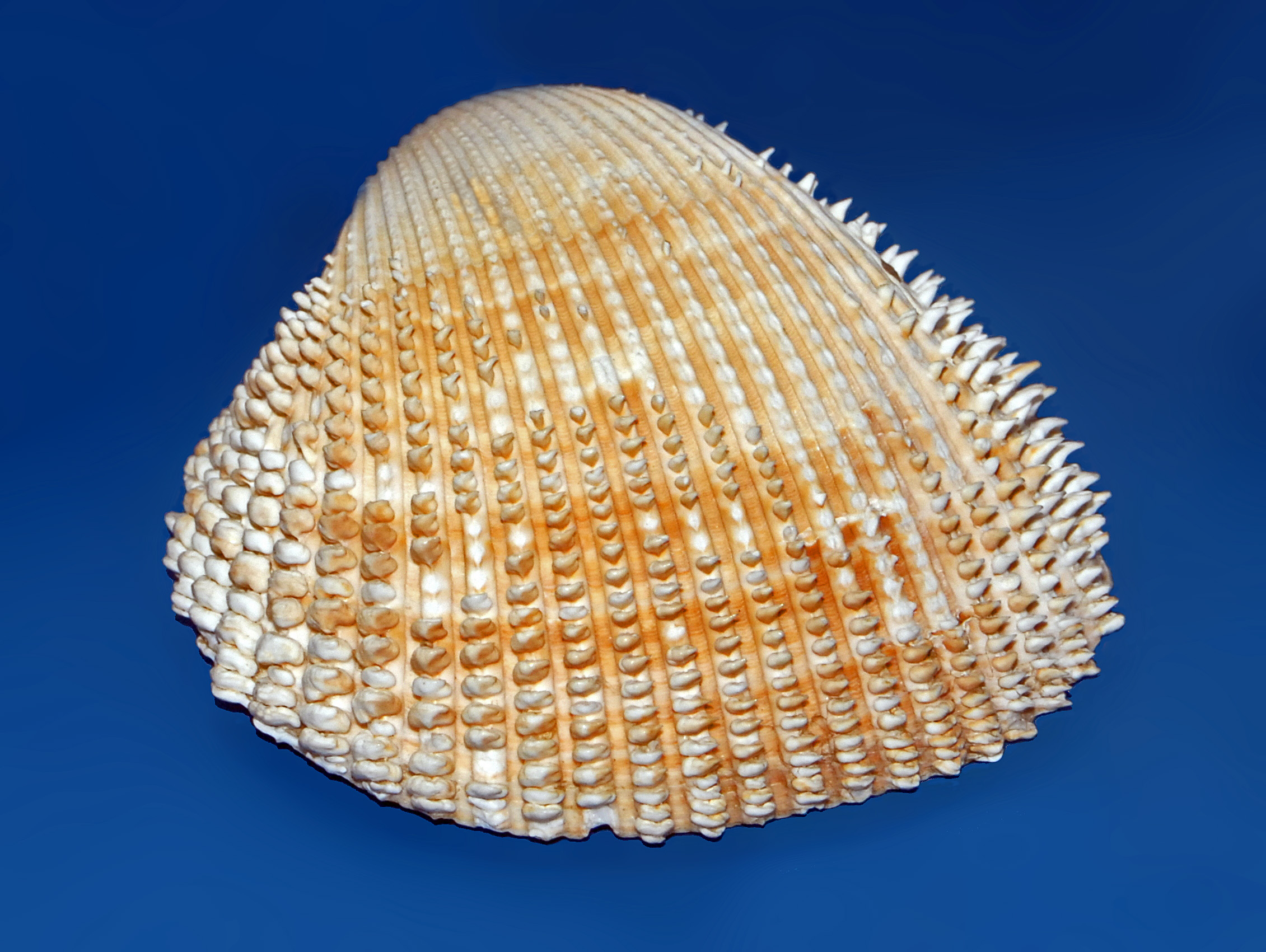
- Shell of Acanthocardia spinosa from Apulia at the Museo Civico di Storia Naturale di Milano

Scientific classification
- Kingdom: Animalia
- Phylum: Mollusca
- Class: Bivalvia
- Order: Cardiida
- Family: Cardiidae
- Genus: Acanthocardia
- Species: A. spinosa

Binomial name
- Acanthocardia spinosa (Lightfoot, 1786)

Synonyms
- Acanthocardia erinaceus Lamarck; Cardium erinaceum Lamarck, 1819; Cardium erinaceum var. alba Monterosato, 1872

= Acanthocardia spinosa =

Species of bivalve

Acanthocardia spinosa, the sand cockle, is a species of saltwater clams, marine bivalve molluscs in the family Cardiidae.

== Description ==
The shell of Acanthocardia spinosa can reach a size of 60–95 mm. This shell is robust, round with a heart-shaped profile, equivalve and inflated, with crenulated margins. The surface shows thick narrowly spaced radial ribs, with rows of pronounced thorny hooks. The basic external coloration is usually pale brown; the interior is white.

== Distribution and habitat ==
Acanthocardia spinosa can be found in the Mediterranean Sea and the eastern Atlantic. This species is present in sand and mud, from low waters to 120 m. Like almost all bivalves, these mollusks are phytoplankton feeders.
