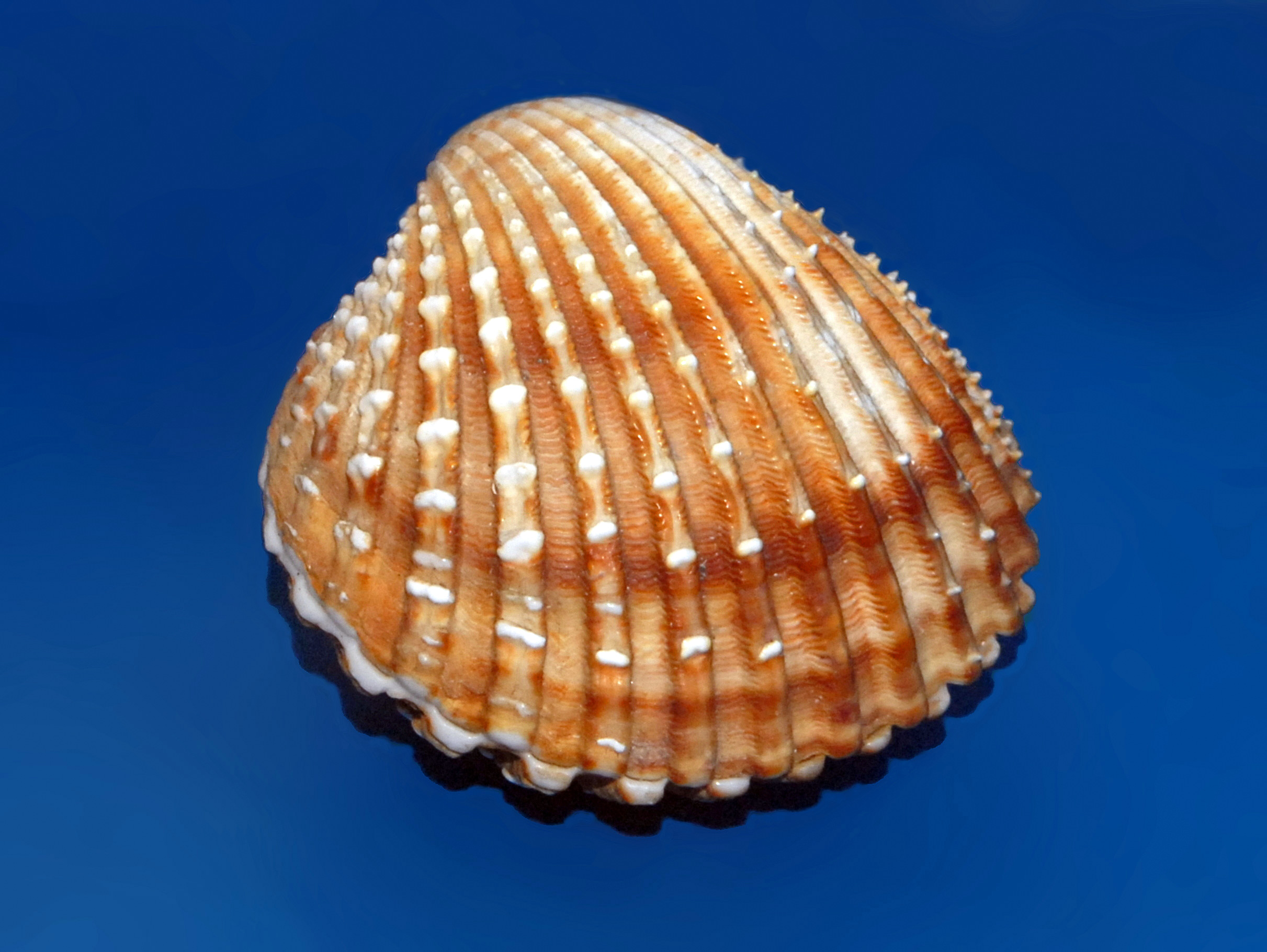
- One valve of the shell of Acanthocardia tuberculata from Sicily at the Museo Civico di Storia Naturale di Milano

Scientific classification
- Kingdom: Animalia
- Phylum: Mollusca
- Class: Bivalvia
- Order: Cardiida
- Family: Cardiidae
- Genus: Acanthocardia
- Species: A. tuberculata

Binomial name
- Acanthocardia tuberculata (Linnaeus, 1758)

Synonyms
- Acanthocardia (Rudicardium) tuberculata (Linnaeus, 1758); Cardium rusticum Linnaeus, 1767; Cardium tuberculatum Linnaeus, 1758; Cardium tuberculatum var. mutica Bucquoy, Dautzenberg & Dollfus, 1892; Eucardium tuberculatum (Linnaeus, 1758); Eucardium tuberculatum var. asperula Coen, 1915; Eucardium tuberculatum var. dautzenbergi Coen, 1915; Eucardium tuberculatum var. palaeomutica Coen, 1915; Eucardium tuberculatum var. picta Coen, 1915; Eucardium tuberculatum var. potens Coen, 1915

= Acanthocardia tuberculata =

Species of bivalve

Acanthocardia tuberculata, the rough cockle, is a species of saltwater clam, a cockle, a marine bivalve mollusc in the family Cardiidae. The genus Acanthocardia is present from the Upper Oligocene to the Recent.

== Description ==
The shell of Acanthocardia tuberculata can reach a size of about 95 mm. This shell is robust, equivalve, inflated and slightly inequilateral, with crenulated margins. The surface shows 18-20 strong radial ribs, with rows of spiny nodules. The basic coloration is usually pale brown with alternating darker concentric bands.

Right and left valve of the same specimen:

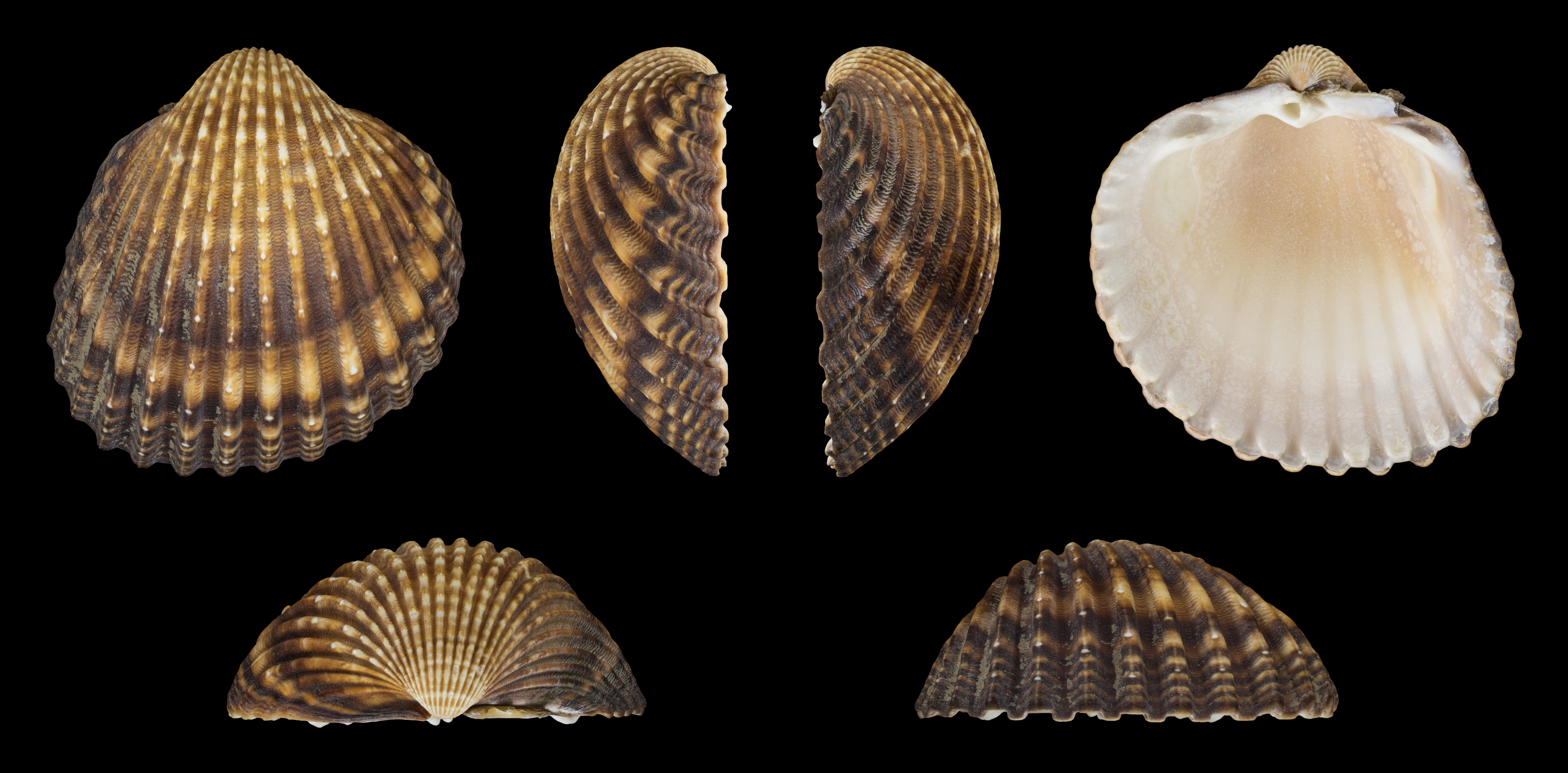
Right valve

Left valve

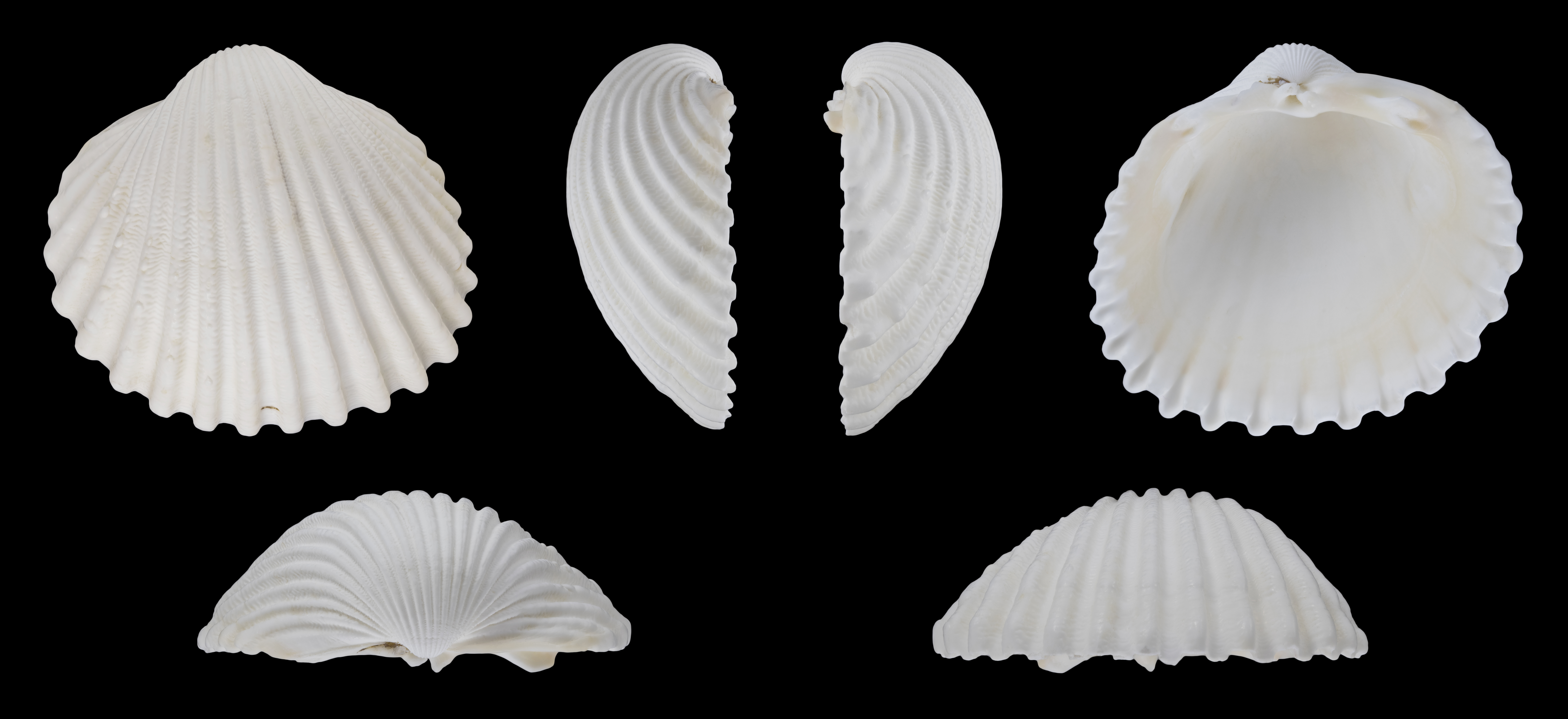
var. alba

== Distribution and habitat ==
Acanthocardia tuberculata can be found in the Mediterranean Sea and in the Northeast Atlantic Ocean. This species is present in the continental shelf from low tide to 200 m. Like most other bivalves, these mollusks are suspension feeders filtering phytoplankton.

== Subspecies ==
- Acanthocardia tuberculata citrinum Brusina, 1865
- Acanthocardia tuberculata tuberculata (Linnaeus, 1758)
- Acanthocardia tuberculata f. alba

== Gallery ==
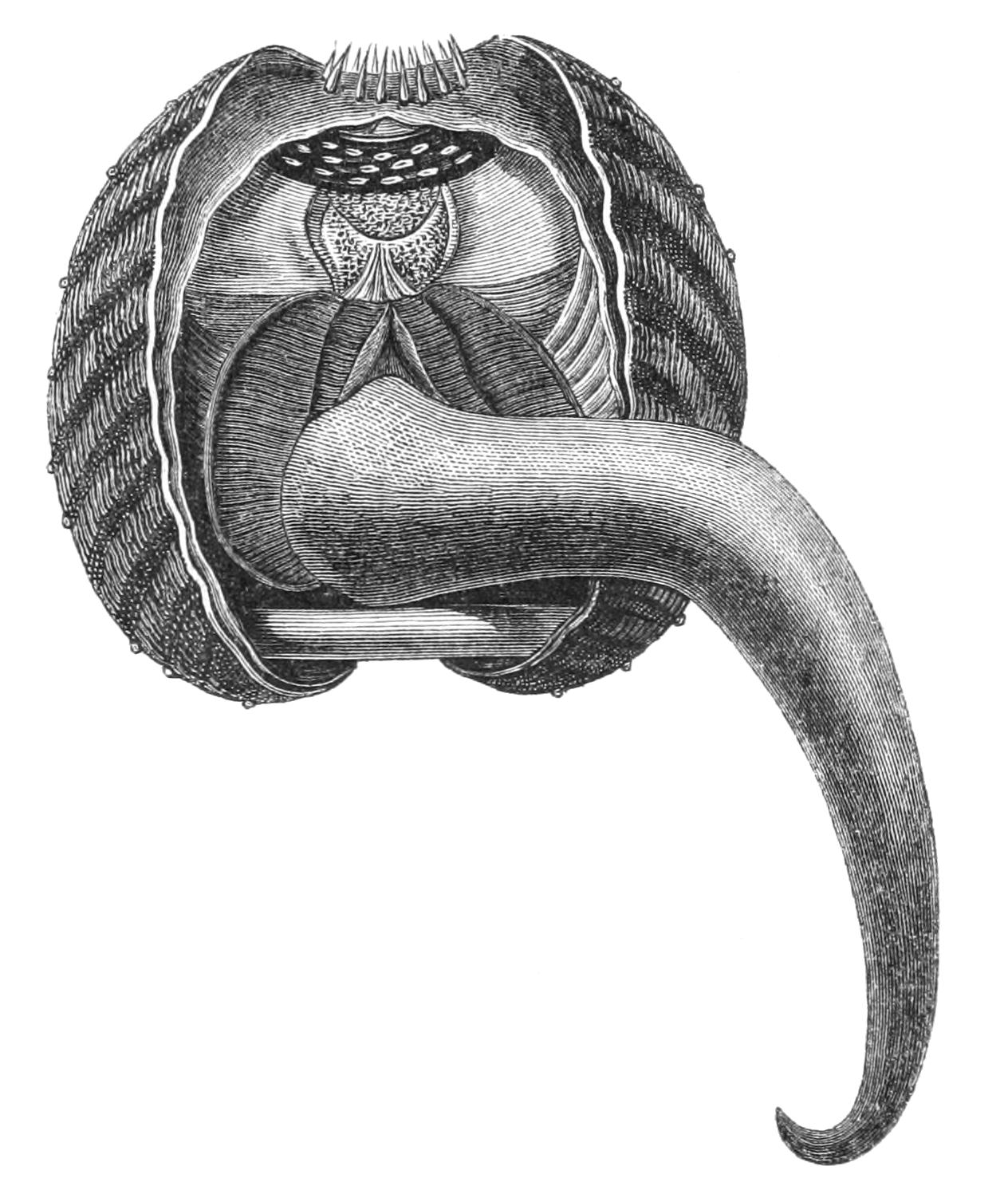
Illustration of Acanthocardia tuberculata from Natural History: Mollusca (1854), p. 271

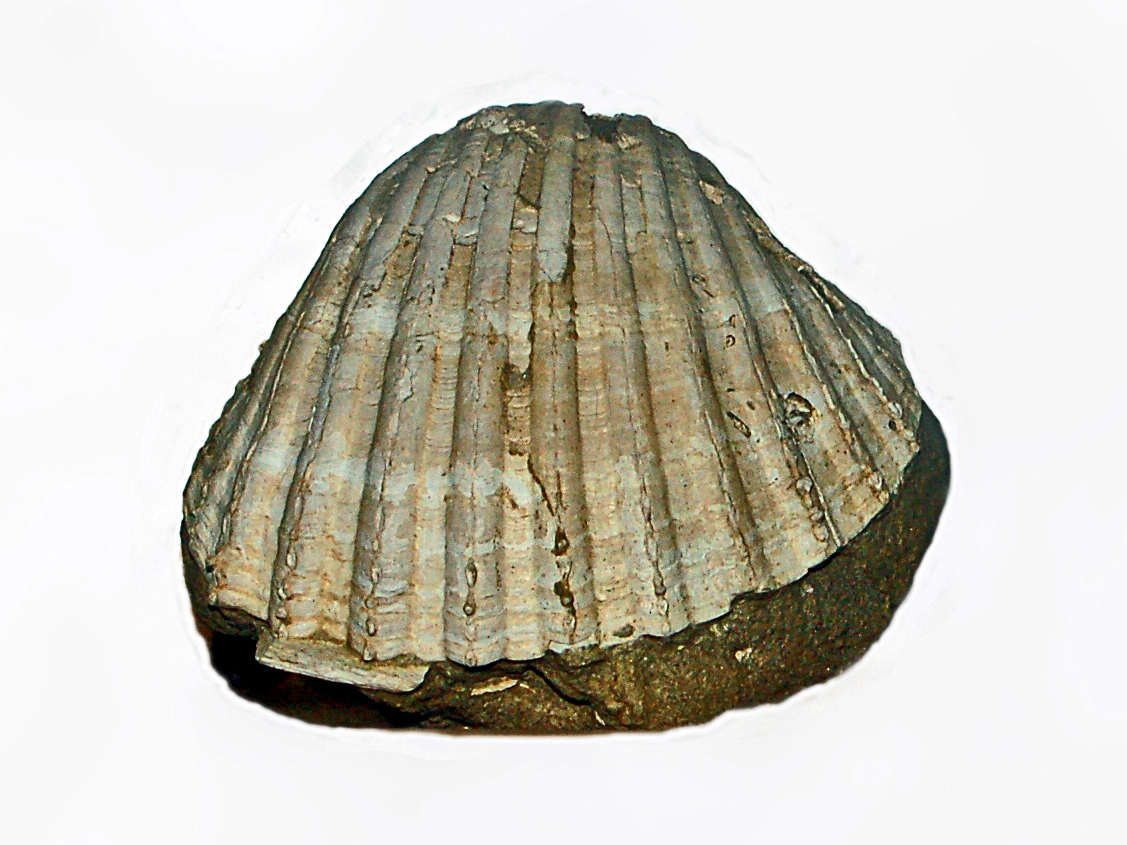
Fossil of Anthocardia tuberculata, Pliocene, Asti (Italy)
