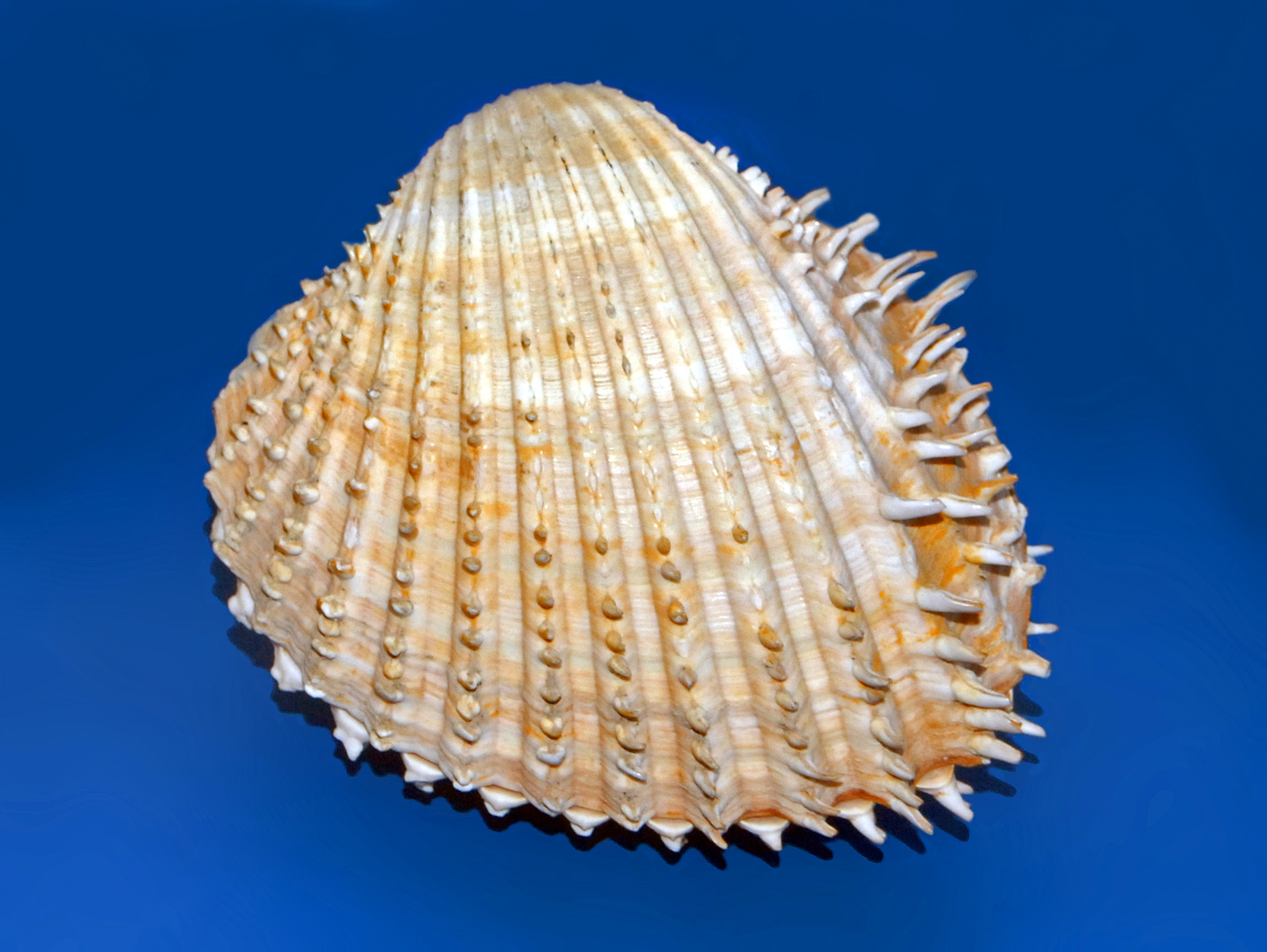
- Shell of Acanthocardia aculeata from Sicily at the Museo Civico di Storia Naturale di Milano

Scientific classification
- Kingdom: Animalia
- Phylum: Mollusca
- Class: Bivalvia
- Order: Cardiida
- Family: Cardiidae
- Genus: Acanthocardia
- Species: A. aculeata

Binomial name
- Acanthocardia aculeata Linnaeus, 1758

Synonyms
- Cardium aculcatum Aradas & Benoit, 1870; Cardium aculeatum Linnaeus, 1758; Cardium spinosum J. Sowerby, 1804

= Acanthocardia aculeata =

Species of bivalve

Acanthocardia aculeata, the spiny cockle, is a species of saltwater clams, marine bivalve molluscs in the family Cardiidae. The genus Acanthocardia is present from the Upper Oligocene to the Recent.

== Description ==
The shell of Acanthocardia aculeata can reach a size of 50–115 mm. This shell is robust, broadly oval, with a heart-shaped profile, equivalve and inflated, with crenulated margins. The surface shows 20-22 prominent radial ribs, with rows of sharp spines, especially at sides. The basic coloration is usually pale brown. The interior is white, with grooves extending throughout the inside.

Right and left valve of the same specimen:

Right valve

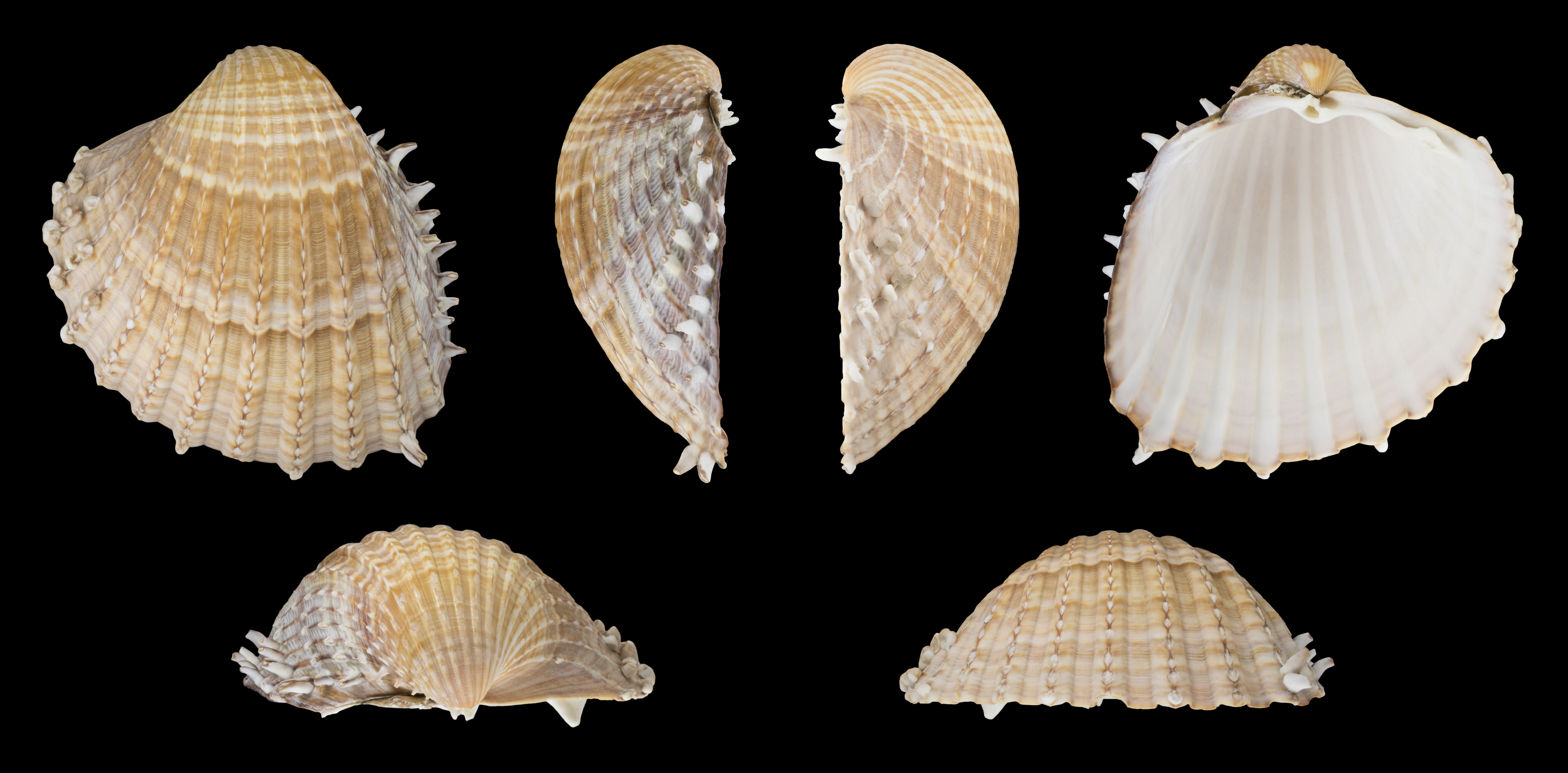
Left valve

== Distribution and habitat ==
Acanthocardia aculeata can be found in the Mediterranean Sea and in North East Atlantic. This species is present in sublittoral muddy sands. These mollusks are phytoplankton feeders.
