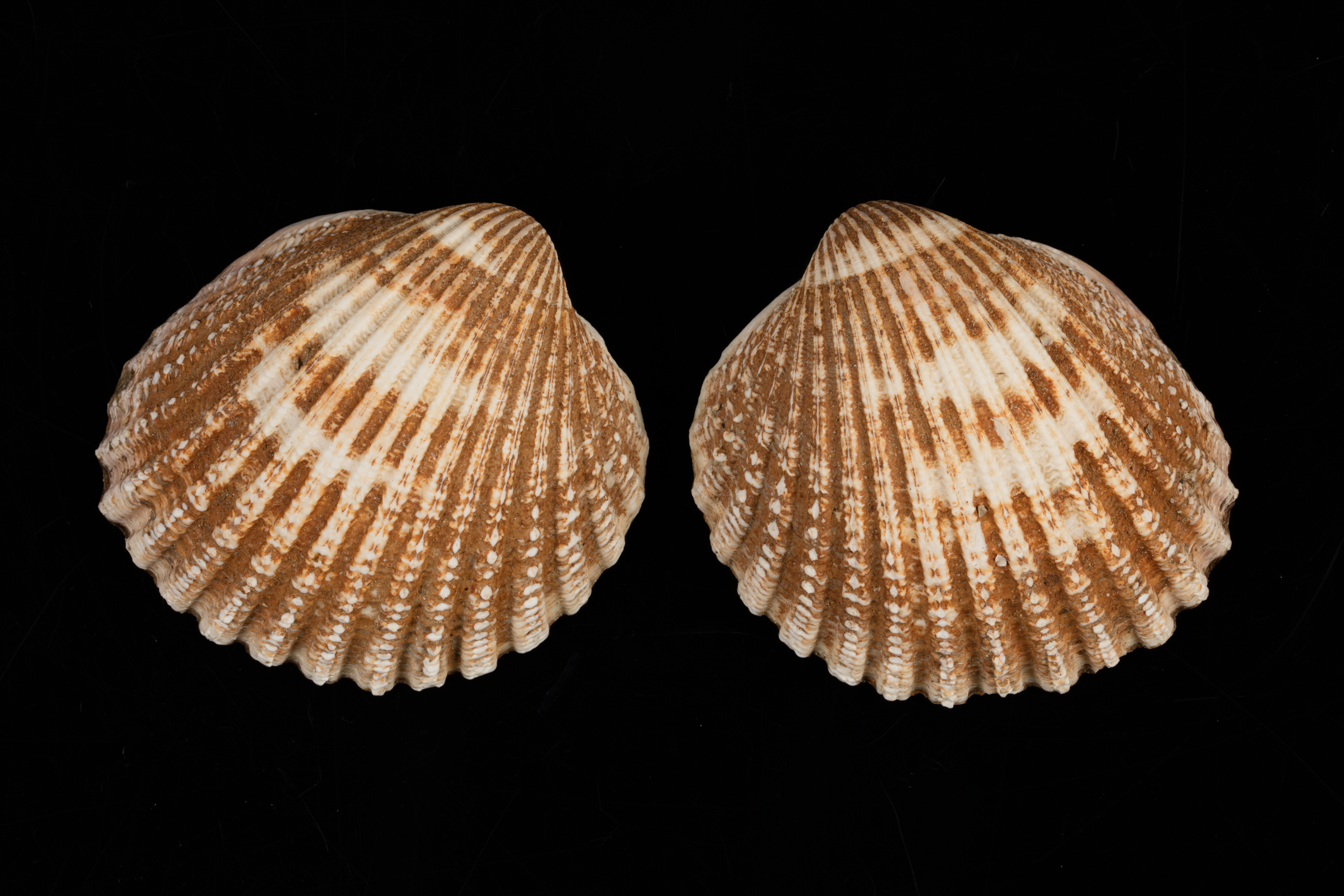

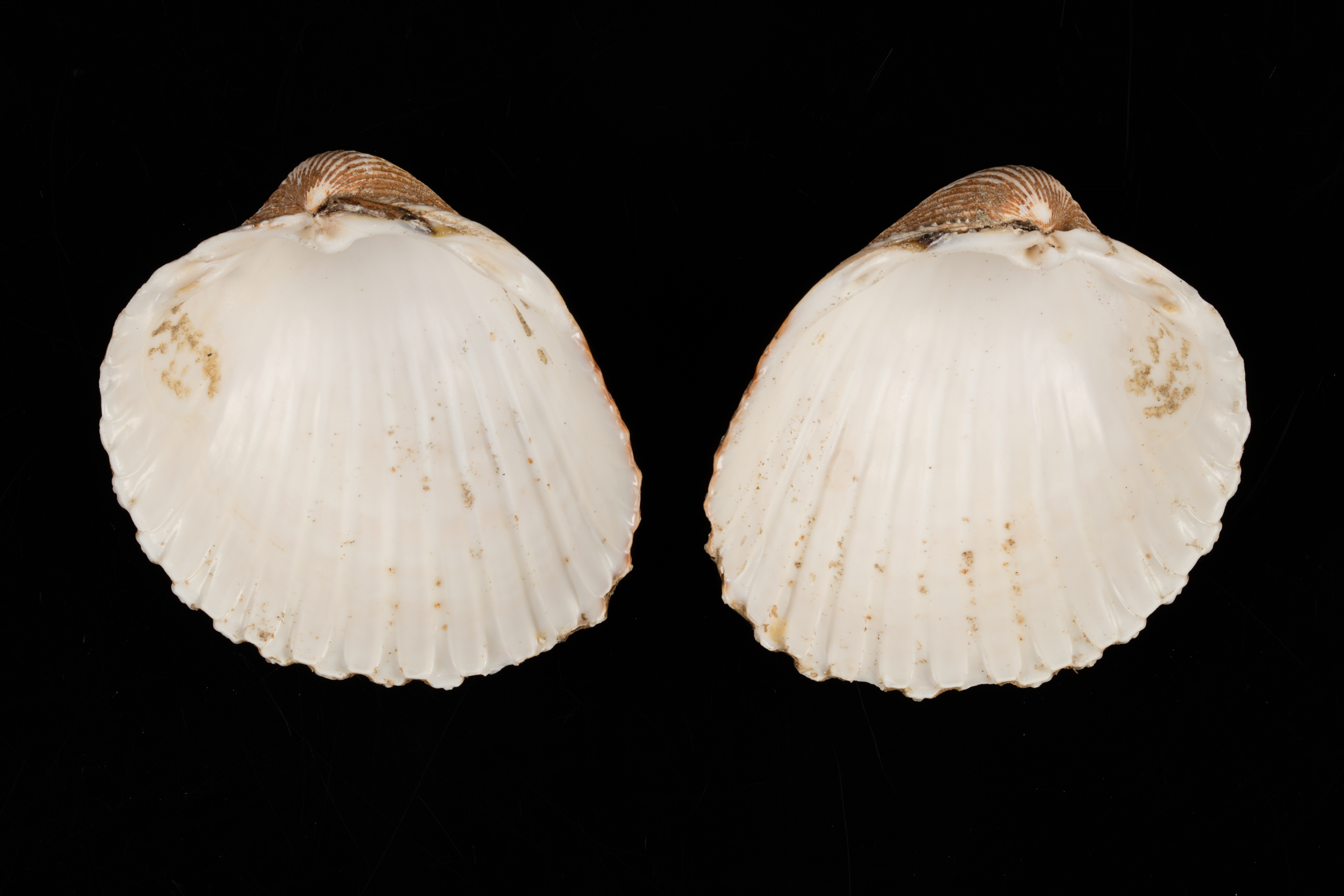

Scientific classification
- Kingdom: Animalia
- Phylum: Mollusca
- Class: Bivalvia
- Order: Cardiida
- Family: Cardiidae
- Genus: Acanthocardia
- Species: A. echinata

Binomial name
- Acanthocardia echinata (Linnaeus, 1758)

Synonyms
- Cardium echinatum Linnaeus, 1758

= Acanthocardia echinata =

Species of bivalve

Acanthocardia echinata, the prickly cockle or European prickly cockle, is a species of saltwater clam, marine bivalve molluscs in the family Cardiidae.

The prickly cockle was one of the many invertebrate species originally described by Carl Linnaeus in his landmark 1758 10th edition of Systema Naturae, where it was given the binomial name Cardium echinatum.

The yellowish-brown shell is up to 75 mm in diameter, and is adorned by 18 to 22 spiny ridges. Its margin is crenulate and its inner surface is white, and also prominently grooved.

The prickly cockle is found in the British Isles and northwestern Europe. It lives within a few centimetres of the sea bottom, at depths of 3 m or more. Dead shells are commonly washed up on the beach.

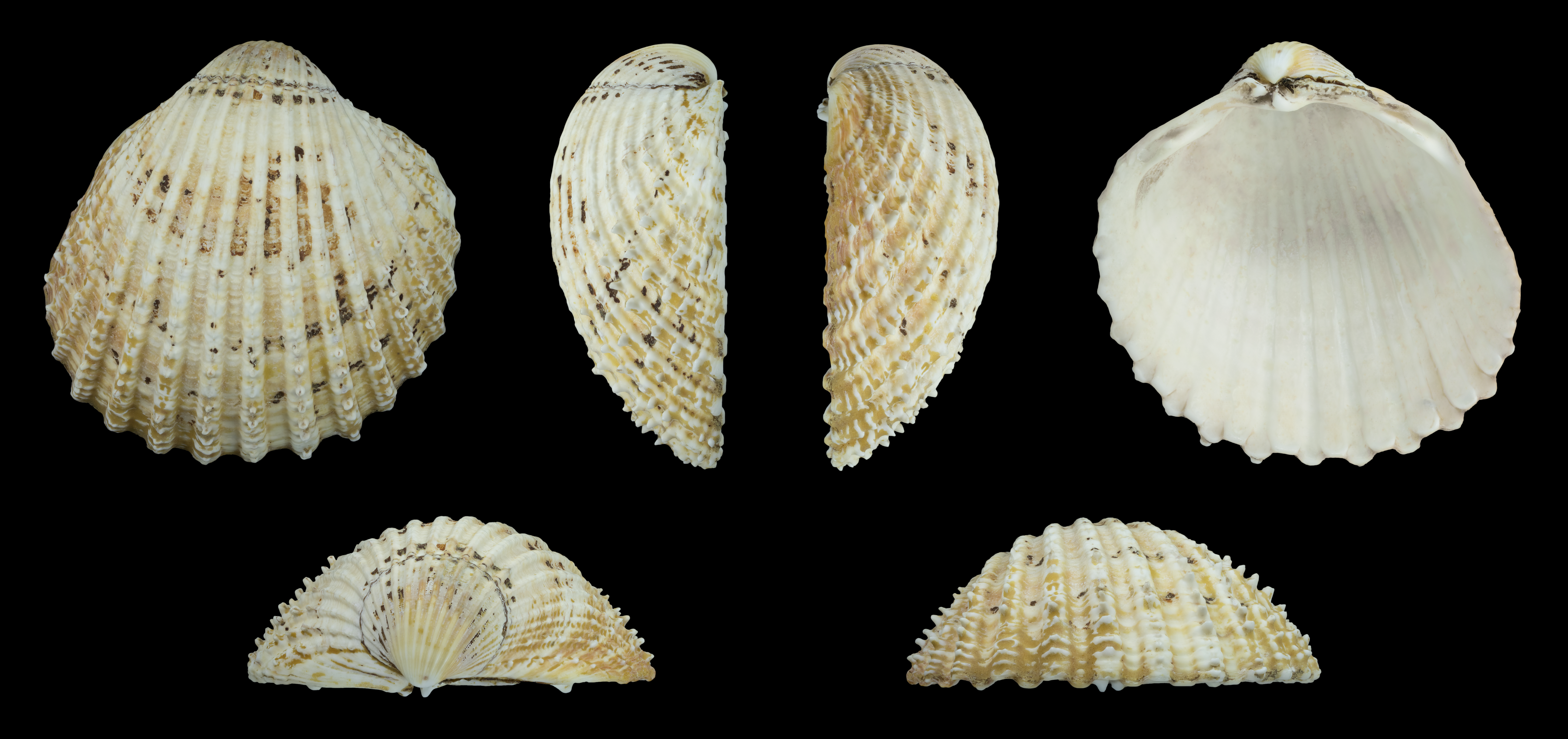
Acanthocardia echinata
Right valve

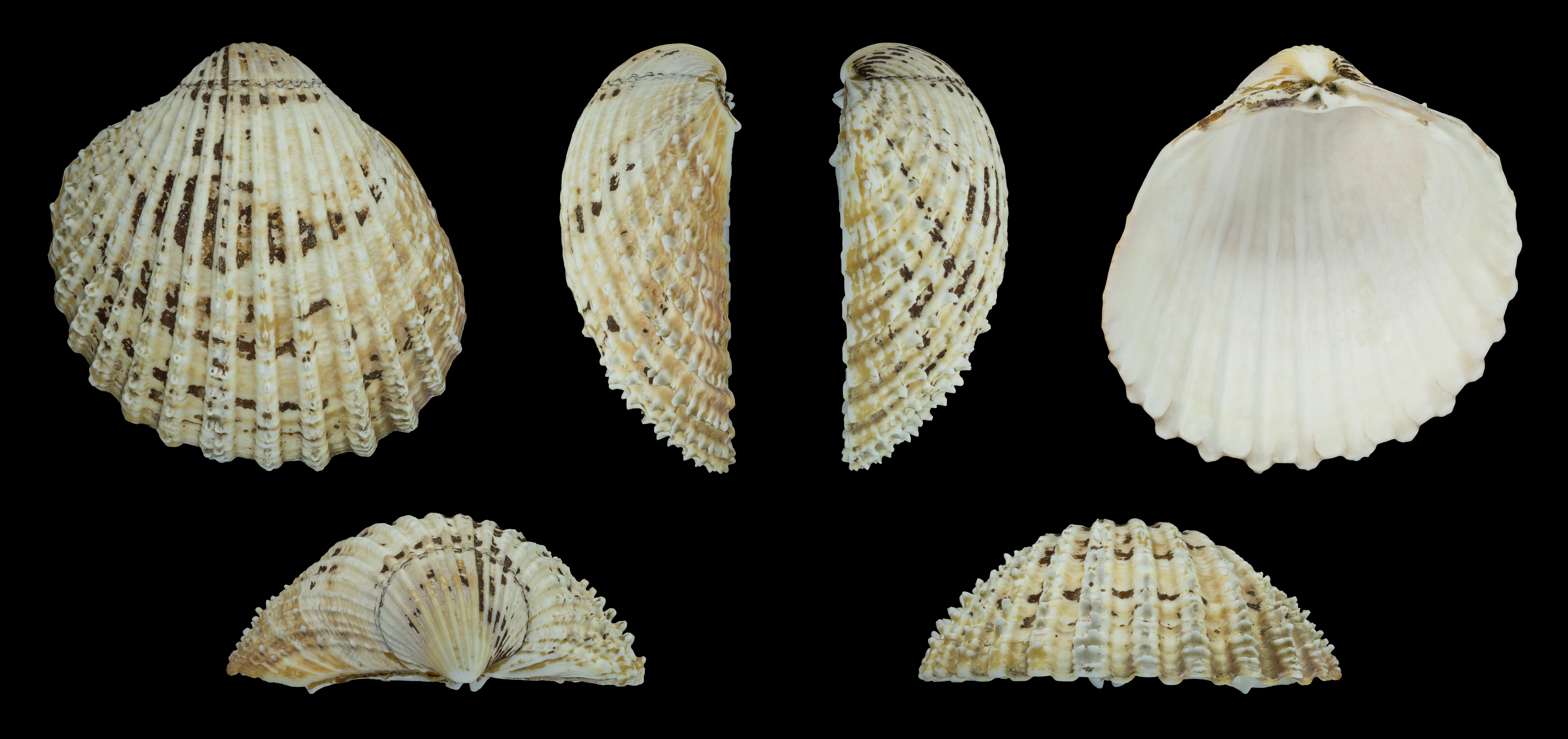
Acanthocardia echinata
Left valve
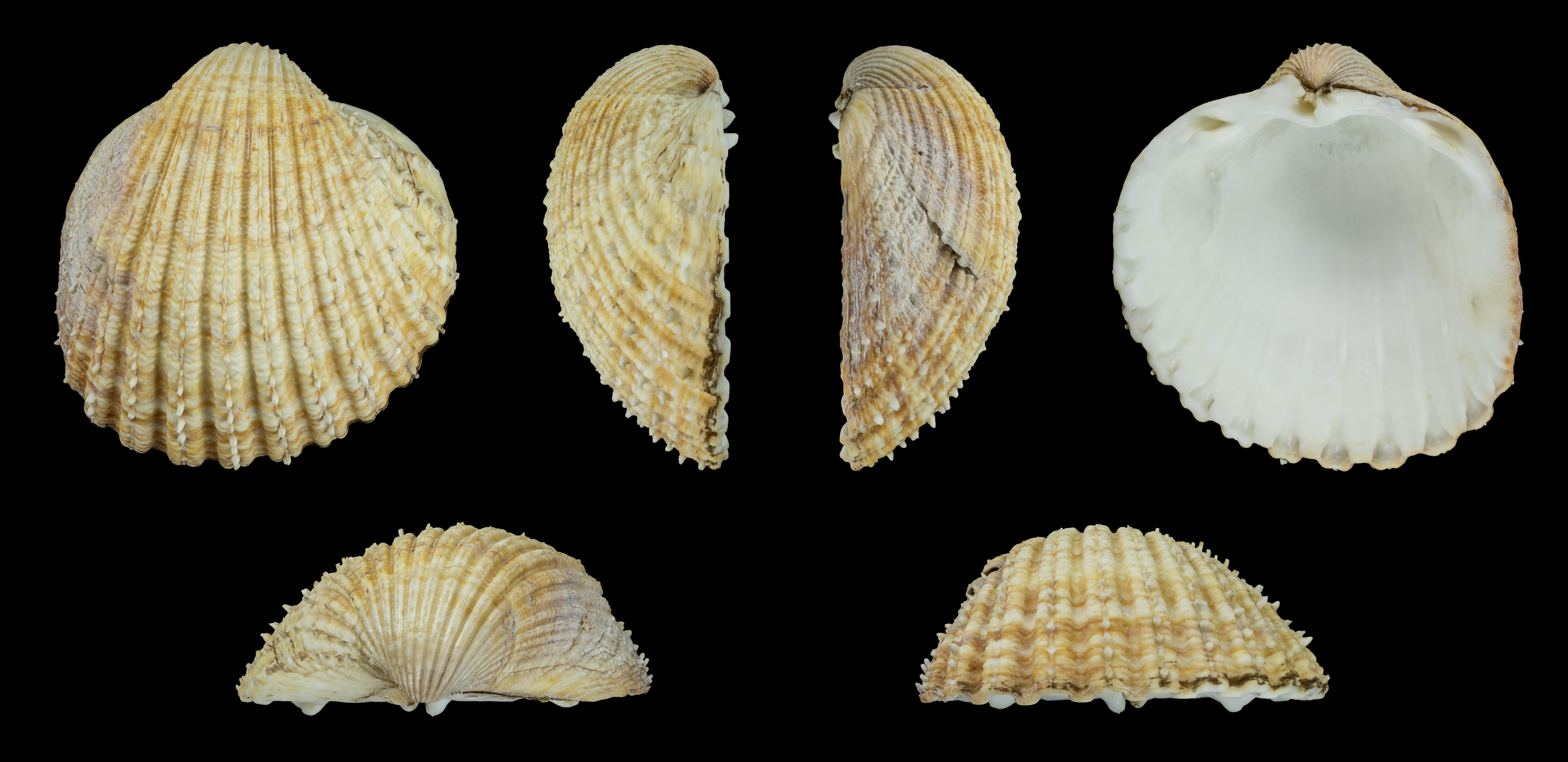
Acanthocardia echinata duregni
Right valve

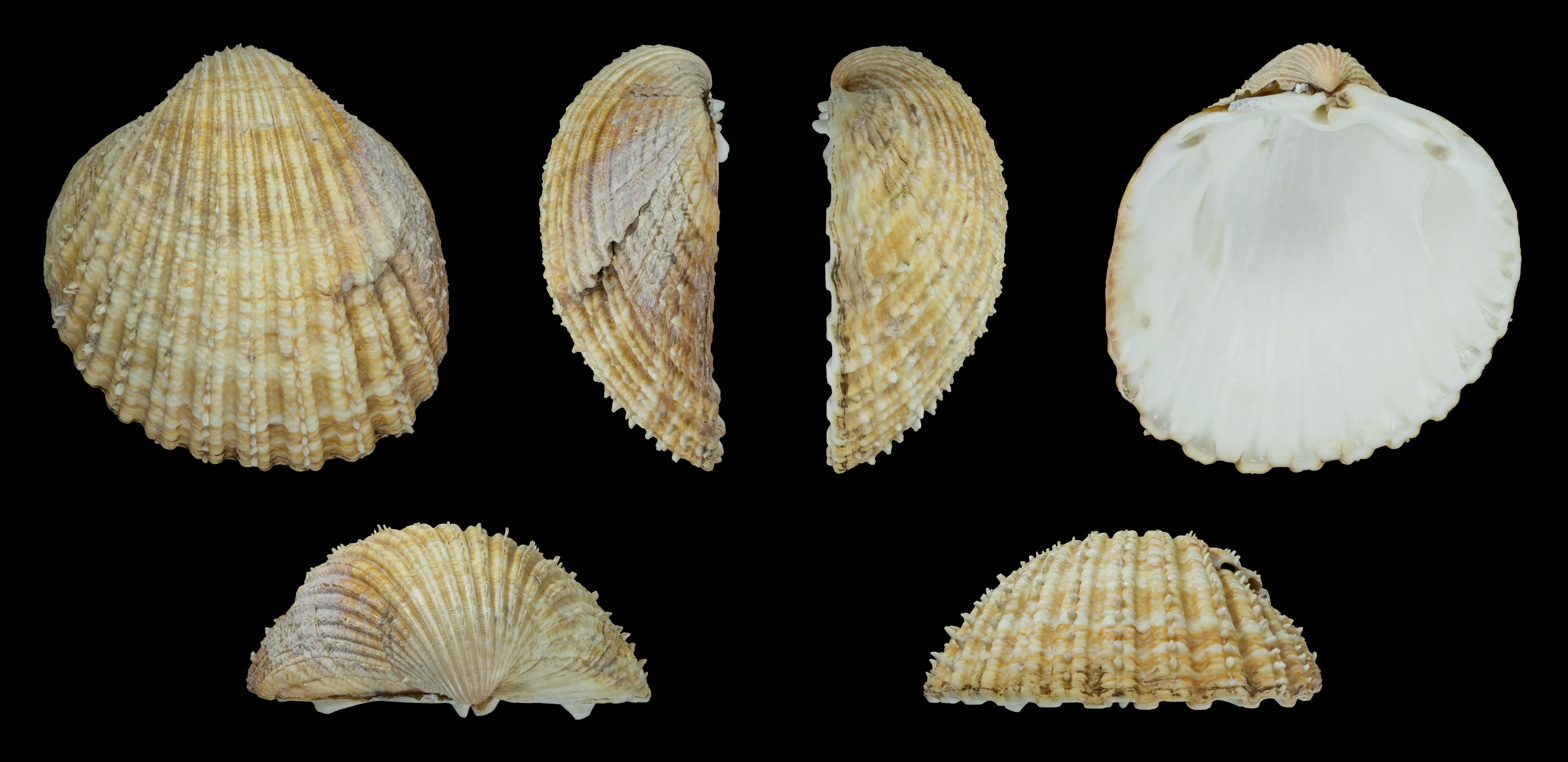
Acanthocardia echinata duregni
Left valve
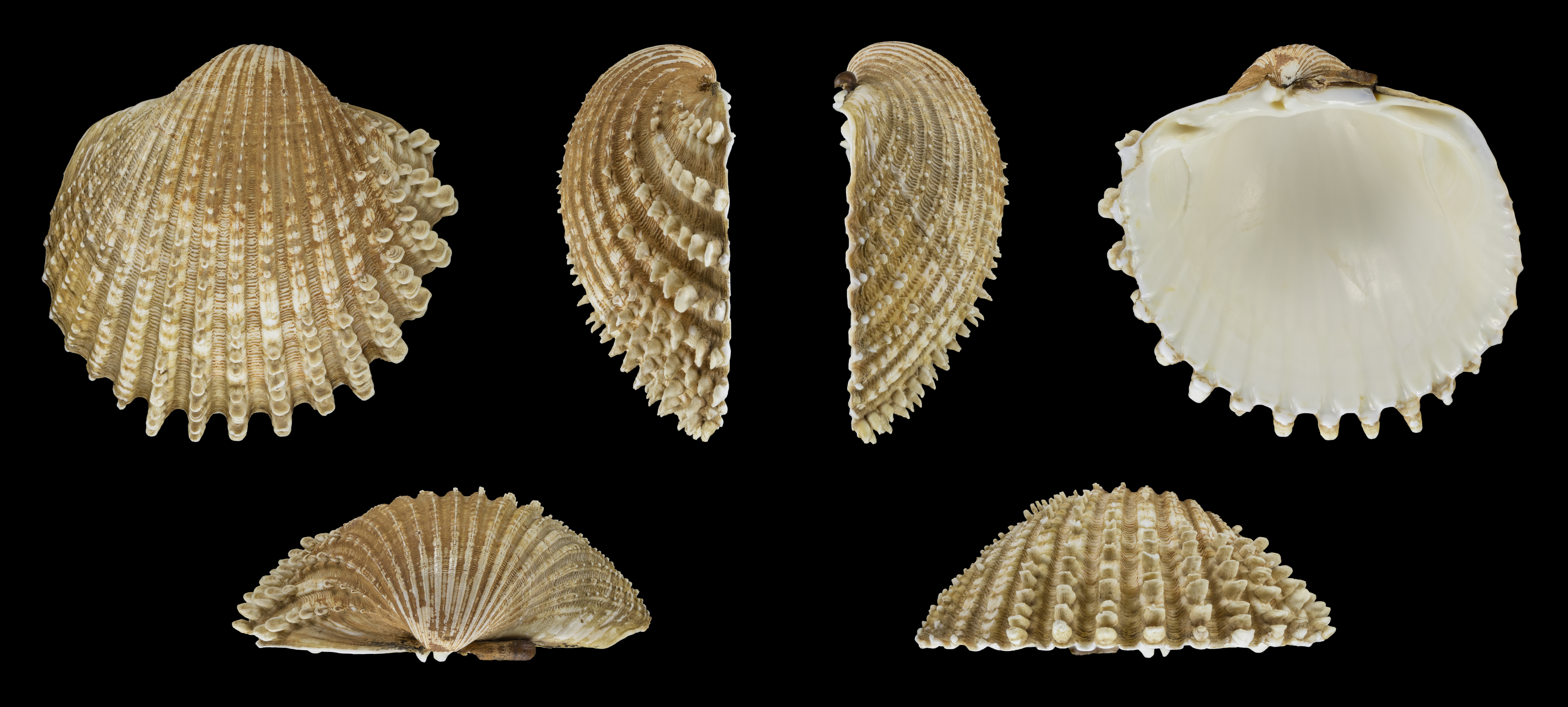
Acanthocardia echinata mucronata
Right valve

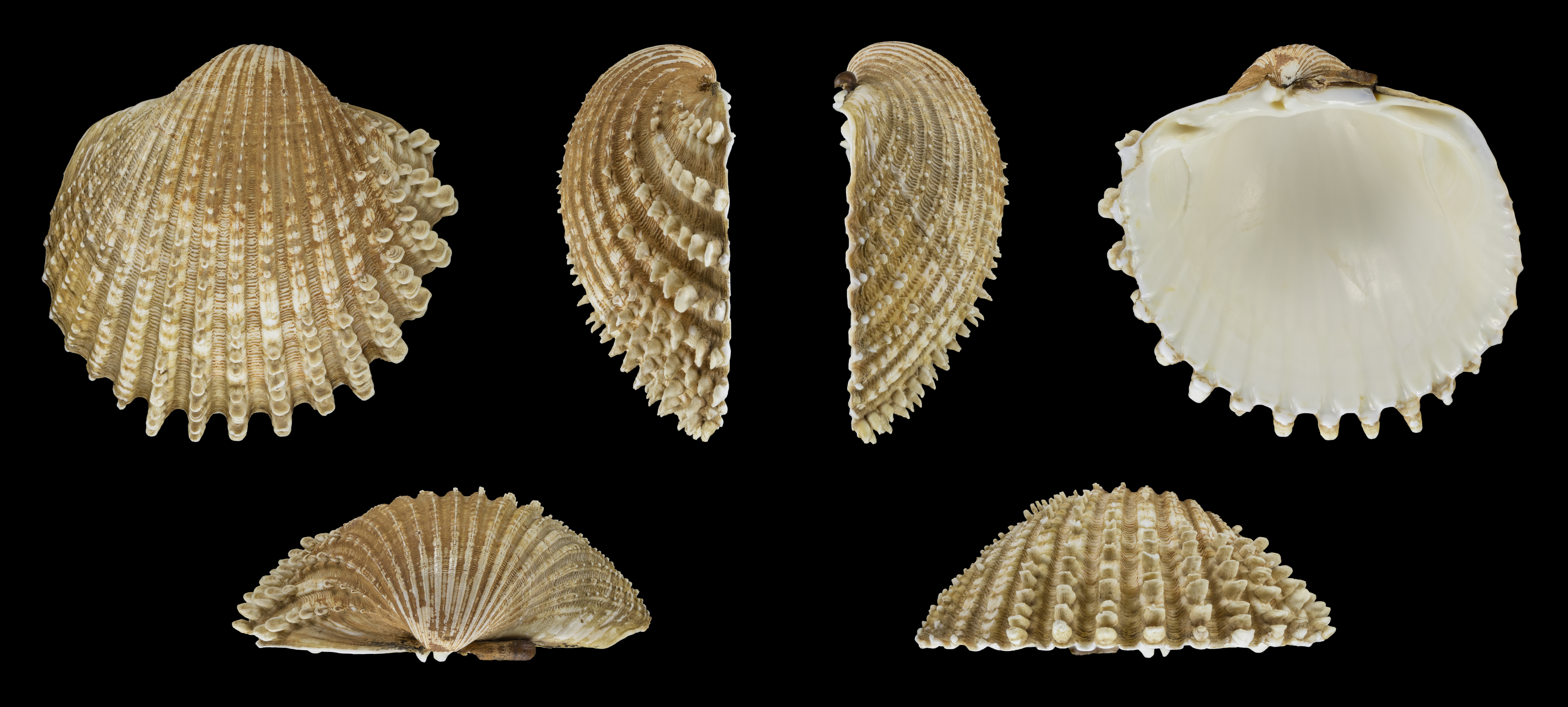
Acanthocardia echinata mucronata
Left valve
