= Europrotomus schroeckingeri =

Europrotomus schroeckingeri Temporal range: Middle Miocene

Scientific classification
- Domain: Eukaryota
- Kingdom: Animalia
- Phylum: Mollusca
- Class: Gastropoda
- Subclass: Caenogastropoda
- Order: Littorinimorpha
- Family: Strombidae
- Genus: †Europrotomus
- Species: †E. schroeckingeri

Binomial name
- †Europrotomus schroeckingeri (Hörnes in Hörnes & Auinger, 1884)

Extinct species of gastropod

Europrotomus schroeckingeri is an extinct species of fossil true conch from the Middle Miocene.
