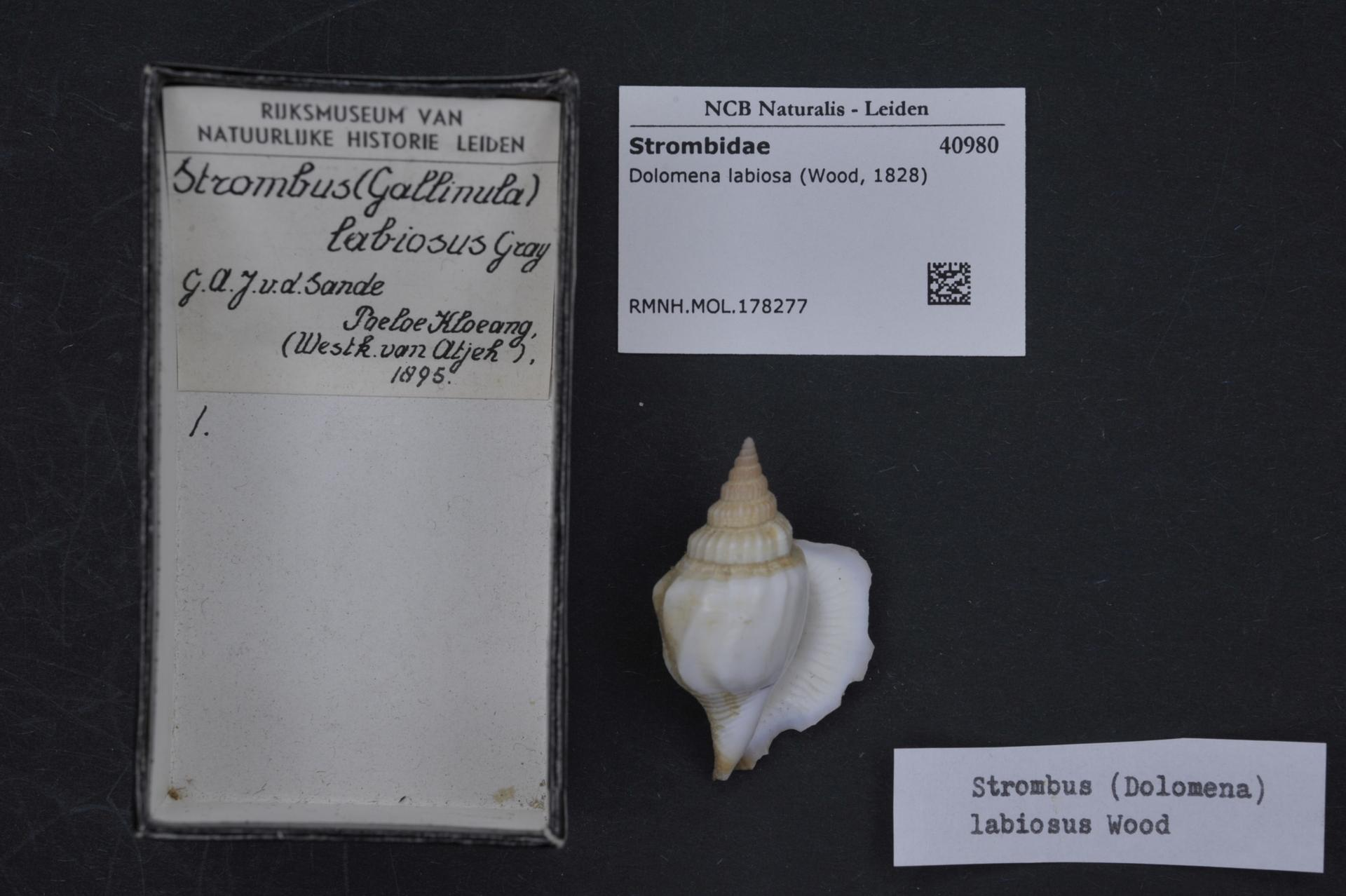
- Shell of Dominus labiosus (specimen at Naturalis Biodiversity Center)

Scientific classification
- Kingdom: Animalia
- Phylum: Mollusca
- Class: Gastropoda
- Subclass: Caenogastropoda
- Order: Littorinimorpha
- Family: Strombidae
- Genus: Dominus
- Species: D. labiosus

Binomial name
- Dominus labiosus (Wood, 1828)

Synonyms
- Dolomena (Dominus) labiosus (W. Wood, 1828) superseded combination; Dolomena abbotti Dekkers & Liverani, 2011 junior subjective synonym; Dolomena labiosa (W. Wood, 1828) superseded combination; Strombus (Dolomena) labiosus (W. Wood, 1828); Strombus (Labiostrombus) labiosus W. Wood, 1818; Strombus labiosus W. Wood, 1828 (original combination)

= Dominus labiosus =

Species of gastropod

Dominus labiosus, commonly known as the thick-lipped conch, is a species of sea snail, a marine gastropod mollusk, in the family Strombidae, the true conchs.

== Description ==
The shell size varies between 20 mm and 65 mm.

== Distribution ==
This species is distributed in the Indian Ocean along Madagascar and Tanzania; in the Pacific Ocean along the Fiji Islands.
