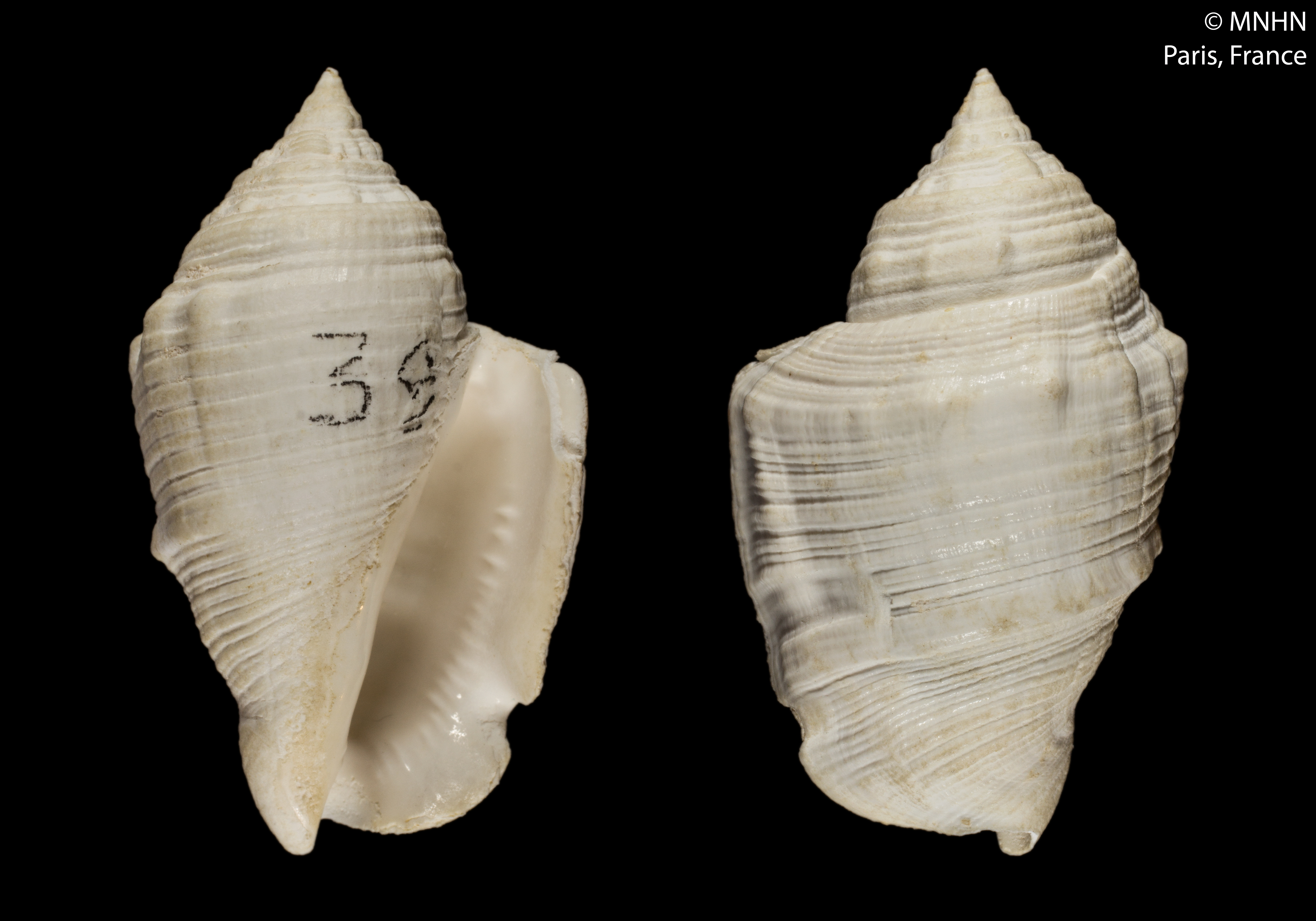
- Shell of † Striatostrombus blanci (holotype at MNHN, Paris)

Scientific classification
- Kingdom: Animalia
- Phylum: Mollusca
- Class: Gastropoda
- Subclass: Caenogastropoda
- Order: Littorinimorpha
- Superfamily: Stromboidea
- Family: Strombidae
- Genus: †Striatostrombus; Dekkers & S.J. Maxwell, 2018

Type species
- †Strombus blanci Tröndlé & B. Salvat, 2010

= Striatostrombus =

Extinct genus of gastropods

Striatostrombus is an extinct genus of fossil sea snails, marine gastropod mollusks in the family Strombidae, the true conchs.

== Species ==
Striatostrombus currently includes two species:

- †Striatostrombus blanci (Tröndlé & B. Salvat, 2010)
- †Striatostrombus micklei (Ladd, 1972)
