= Thetystrombus =

Scientific classification
- Kingdom: Animalia
- Phylum: Mollusca
- Class: Gastropoda
- Subclass: Caenogastropoda
- Order: Littorinimorpha
- Superfamily: Stromboidea
- Family: Strombidae
- Genus: Thetystrombus; Dekkers, 2008

Type species
- Strombus latus Gmelin, 1791

Genus of gastropods

Thetystrombus is a genus of sea snails, marine gastropod mollusks in the family Strombidae, the true conchs.

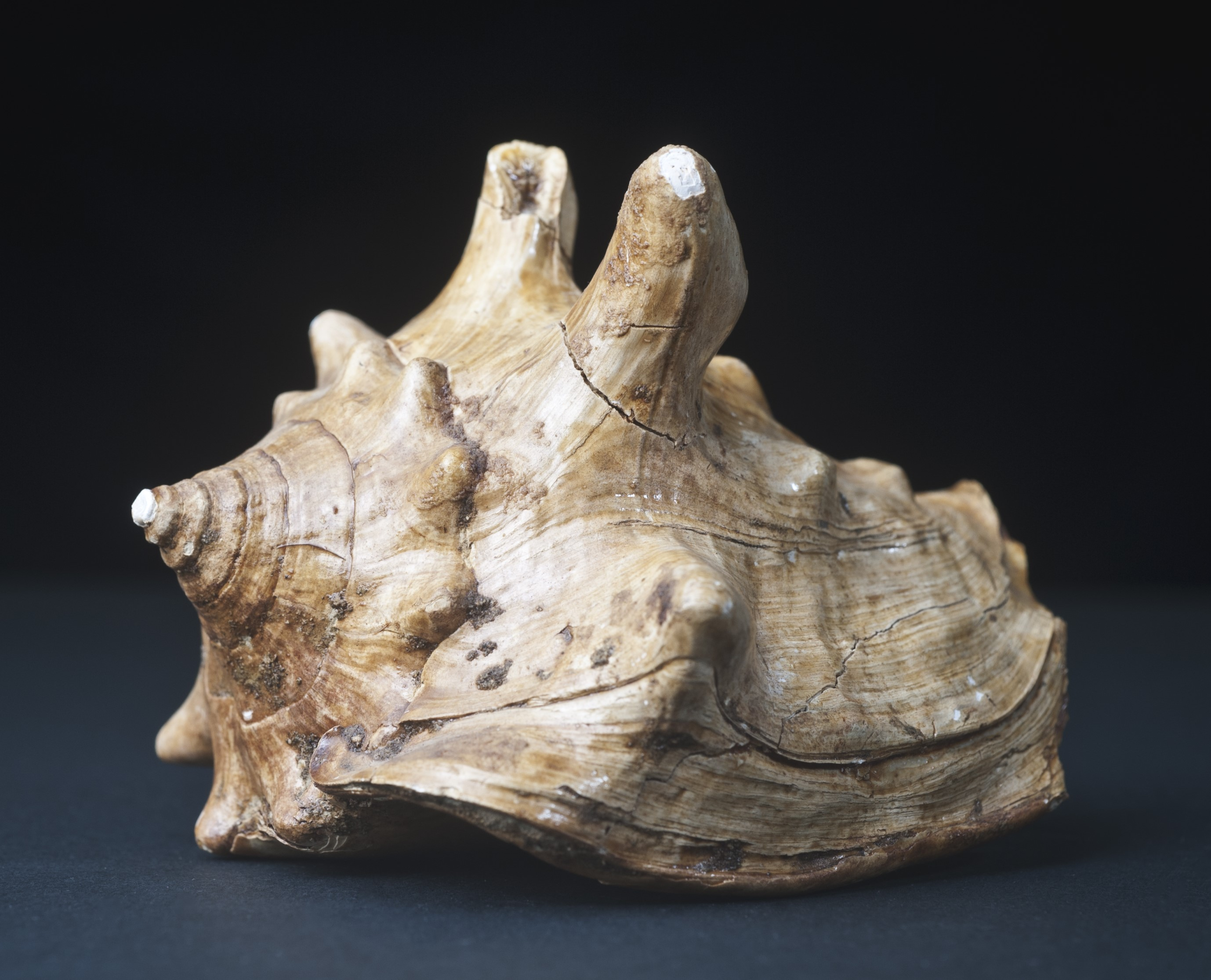
Thetystrombus coronatus (Defrance, 1827), Natural History Museum University of Pisa

== Species ==
Species within the genus Thetystrombus include:

- † Thetystrombus coronatus (Defrance, 1827)
- † Thetystrombus exbonellii (Sacco, 1893)
- † Thetystrombus inflexus (Eichwald, 1830)
- † Thetystrombus lapugyensis (Sacco, 1893)
- Thetystrombus latus (Gmelin, 1791)
- † Thetystrombus pannonicus (Harzhauser & Kronenberg, 2013)
