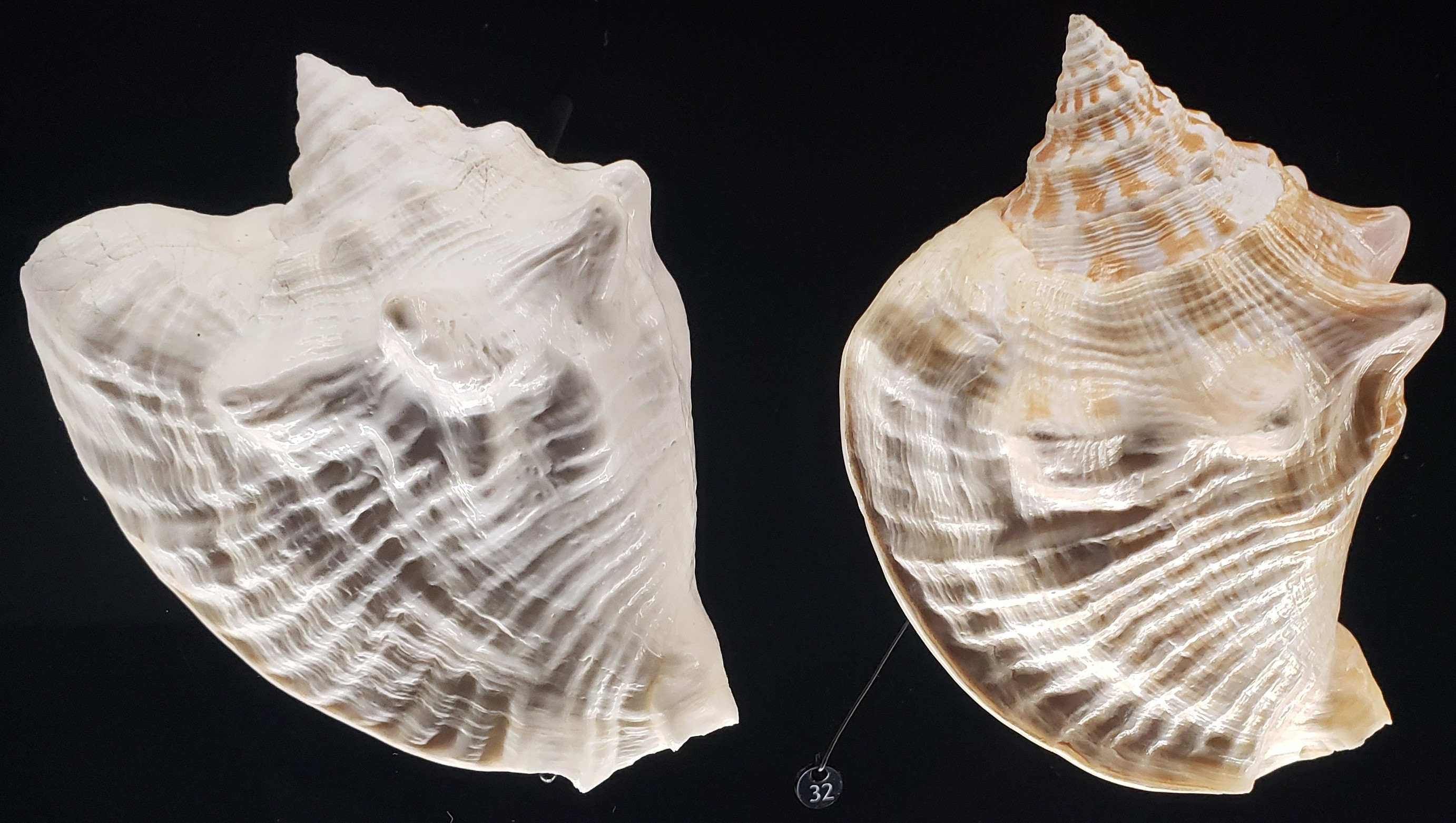
- Shells of Macrostrombus costatus, type species of the genus Macrostrombus

Scientific classification
- Kingdom: Animalia
- Phylum: Mollusca
- Class: Gastropoda
- Subclass: Caenogastropoda
- Order: Littorinimorpha
- Family: Strombidae
- Genus: Macrostrombus; Petuch, 1994

Type species
- Strombus costatus Gmelin, 1791

Synonyms
- Strombus (Macrostrombus) Petuch, 1994 (original rank)

= Macrostrombus =

Genus of gastropods

Macrostrombus is a genus of sea snails, marine gastropod mollusks in the family Strombidae, the true conchs.

== Species ==
- † Macrostrombus bartoni Petuch & Drolshagen, 2011
- † Macrostrombus brachior (Petuch, 1994)
- † Macrostrombus briani Petuch & Drolshagen, 2011
- † Macrostrombus collierensis Petuch & Drolshagen, 2011
- Macrostrombus costatus (Gmelin, 1791)
- † Macrostrombus diegelae (Petuch, 1991)
- † Macrostrombus dubari Petuch & Drolshagen, 2011
- † Macrostrombus haitensis (G. B. Sowerby I, 1850)
- † Macrostrombus hertweckorum (Petuch, 1991)
- † Macrostrombus jonesorum (Petuch, 1994)
- † Macrostrombus leidyi (Heilprin, 1887)
- † Macrostrombus mayacensis (H. I. Tucker & D. Wilson, 1933)
- † Macrostrombus mulepenensis (Petuch, 1994)
- † Macrostrombus oleiniki Petuch & Drolshagen, 2011
- † Macrostrombus pascaleae (Landau, Kronenberg & Silva, 2010)
- † Macrostrombus sargenti Petuch & Drolshagen, 2011
- † Macrostrombus tomeui Petuch & Drolshagen, 2011
- † Macrostrombus whicheri Petuch & Drolshagen, 2011
- † Macrostrombus williamsi (Olsson & Petit, 1964)
