= Europrotomus =

Europrotomus Temporal range: Middle Miocene

Scientific classification
- Kingdom: Animalia
- Phylum: Mollusca
- Class: Gastropoda
- Subclass: Caenogastropoda
- Order: Littorinimorpha
- Family: Strombidae
- Genus: †Europrotomus; Kronenberg & Harzhauser, 2011

Extinct genus of gastropods

Europrotomus is an extinct genus of fossil sea snails, true conches, marine gastropod mollusks in the family Strombidae, the true conchs.

== Species ==
Species within the genus Europrotomus include:

- †Europrotomus schroeckingeri (Hörnes in Hörnes & Auinger, 1884)

This genus was described by Gijs C. Kronenberg and Mathias Harzhauser in 2012 especially for the fossil species previously known as Strombus schroeckingeri. That species existed during the Miocene in what is now Austria, Bosnia and Herzegovina, Bulgaria, Hungary and Romania.
