= Dominus (gastropod) =

Scientific classification
- Kingdom: Animalia
- Phylum: Mollusca
- Class: Gastropoda
- Subclass: Caenogastropoda
- Order: Littorinimorpha
- Family: Strombidae
- Genus: Dominus; Dekkers & S. J. Maxwell, 2020

Type species
- Strombus labiosus W. Wood, 1828

Synonyms
- Dolomena (Dominus) Dekkers & S. J. Maxwell, 2020 superseded rank

Genus of gastropods

Dominus is a genus of sea snails, marine gastropod mollusks in the family Strombidae, the true conchs.

== Species ==
- Dominus abbotti (Dekkers & Liverani, 2011)
- † Dominus fennemai (K. Martin, 1899)
- Dominus labiosus (W. Wood, 1828)
- Dominus likuii (C. L. Zhu, 2023)
- † Dominus teschi (L. R. Cox, 1948)
- Dominus vinki Dekkers & S. J. Maxwell, 2024
- Dominus wienekei (Wiersma & D. Monsecour, 2012)
