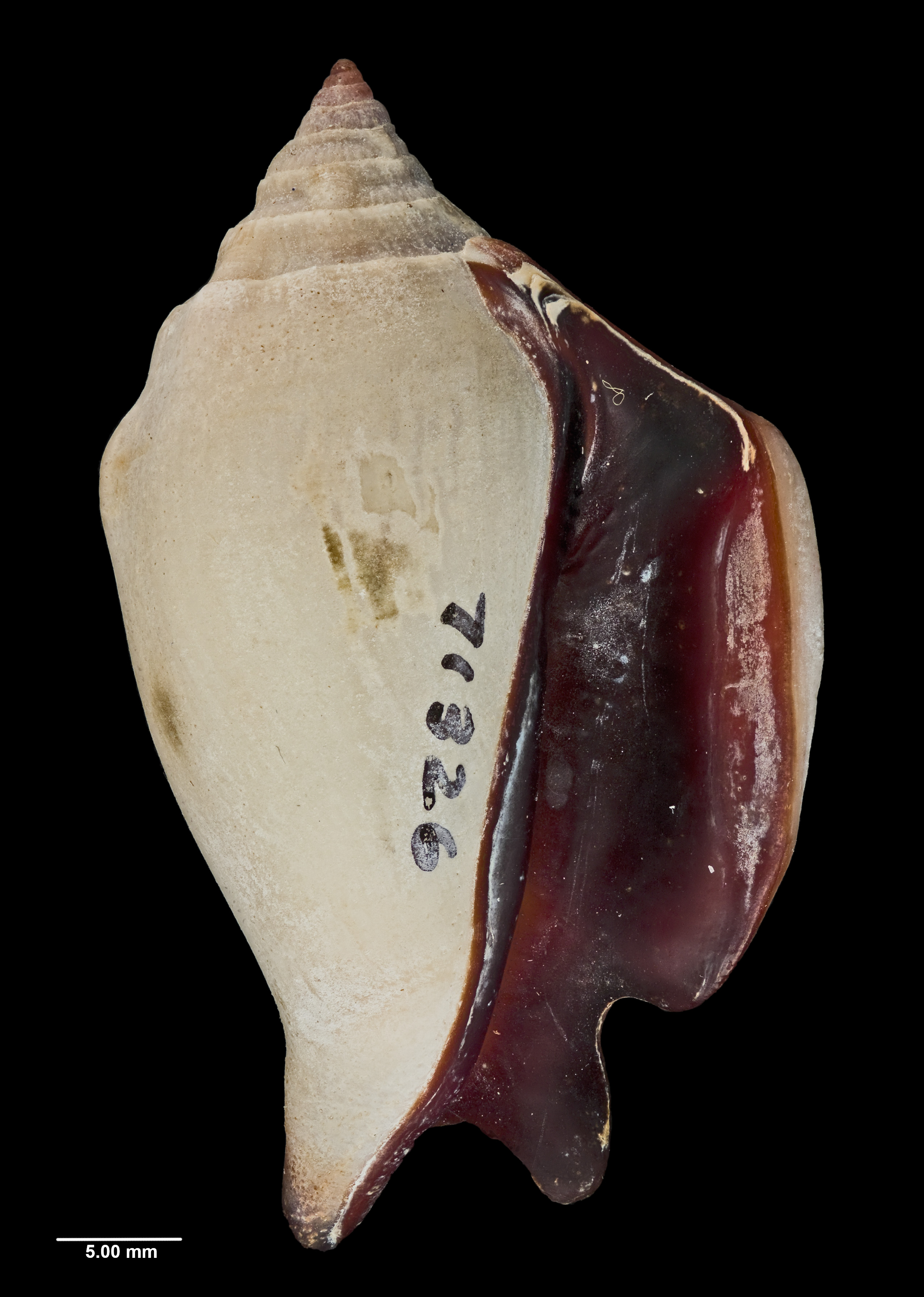
- Holotype of B. kleckhamae

Scientific classification
- Kingdom: Animalia
- Phylum: Mollusca
- Class: Gastropoda
- Subclass: Caenogastropoda
- Order: Littorinimorpha
- Superfamily: Stromboidea
- Family: Strombidae
- Genus: Barneystrombus; Blackwood, 2009

Type species
- Strombus kleckhamae Cernohorsky, 1971

= Barneystrombus =

Genus of gastropods

Barneystrombus is a genus of sea snails, marine gastropod mollusks in the family Strombidae, the true conchs.

== Species ==
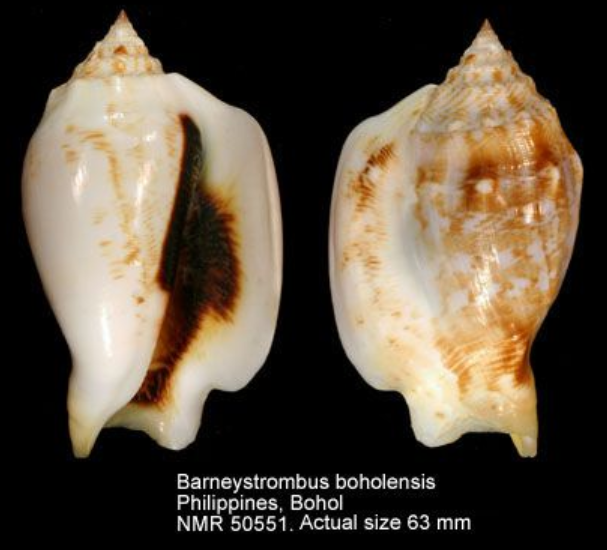
Specimen of B. boholensis

- Barneystrombus boholensis (Mühlhäusser, 1981)
- Barneystrombus kleckhamae (Cernohorsky, 1971)
