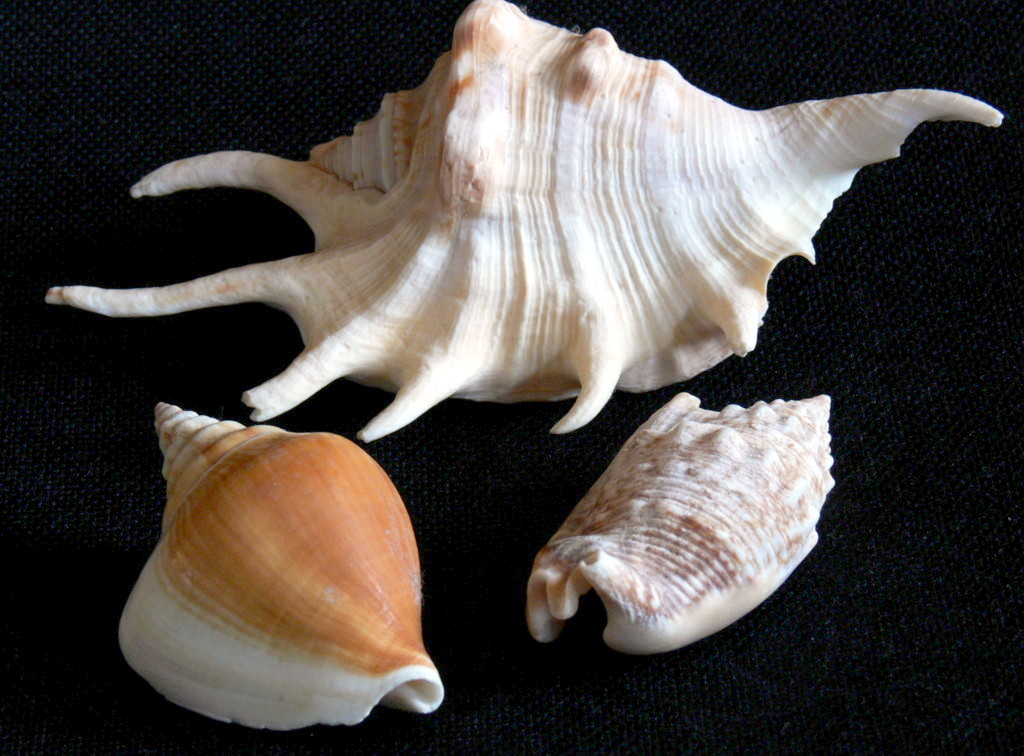
- Three shells of three species in the family Strombidae: lower left Laevistrombus turturella, upper center Lambis lambis, lower right Euprotomus aurisdianae

Scientific classification
- Kingdom: Animalia
- Phylum: Mollusca
- Class: Gastropoda
- Subclass: Caenogastropoda
- Order: Littorinimorpha
- Superfamily: Stromboidea
- Family: Strombidae; Rafinesque, 1815

Genera
- See text

Synonyms
- Aligerini S. J. Maxwell, Dekkers, Rymer & Congdon, 2020 alternative representation; Dolomenini Dekkers & S. J. Maxwell, 2020 alternative representation; Doxanderina Dekkers & S. J. Maxwell, 2020 alternative representation; Neoaligerinae S. J. Maxwell & Rymer, 2021 (unavailable name: not based on an available genus-group name); Neostrombini Liverani, Dekkers & S. J. Maxwell, 2021 alternative representation; Neostromboidae S. J. Maxwell, Dekkers, Rymer & Congdon, 2019 (unavailable name: not based on an...); Persististrombini S. J. Maxwell, Dekkers, Rymer & Congdon, 2020 alternative representation; Pteroceridae Haller, 1892

= Strombidae =

Strombidae Temporal range: Lower Jurassic–Present

Family of molluscs

Strombidae, commonly known as the true conchs, is a taxonomic family of medium-sized to very large sea snails in the superfamily Stromboidea, and the Epifamily Neostromboidae. The term true conchs, being a common name, does not have an exact meaning. It may generally refer to any of the Strombidae but sometimes is used more specifically to include only Strombus and Lambis. The family currently includes 31 extant, and 10 extinct genera.

== Distribution ==
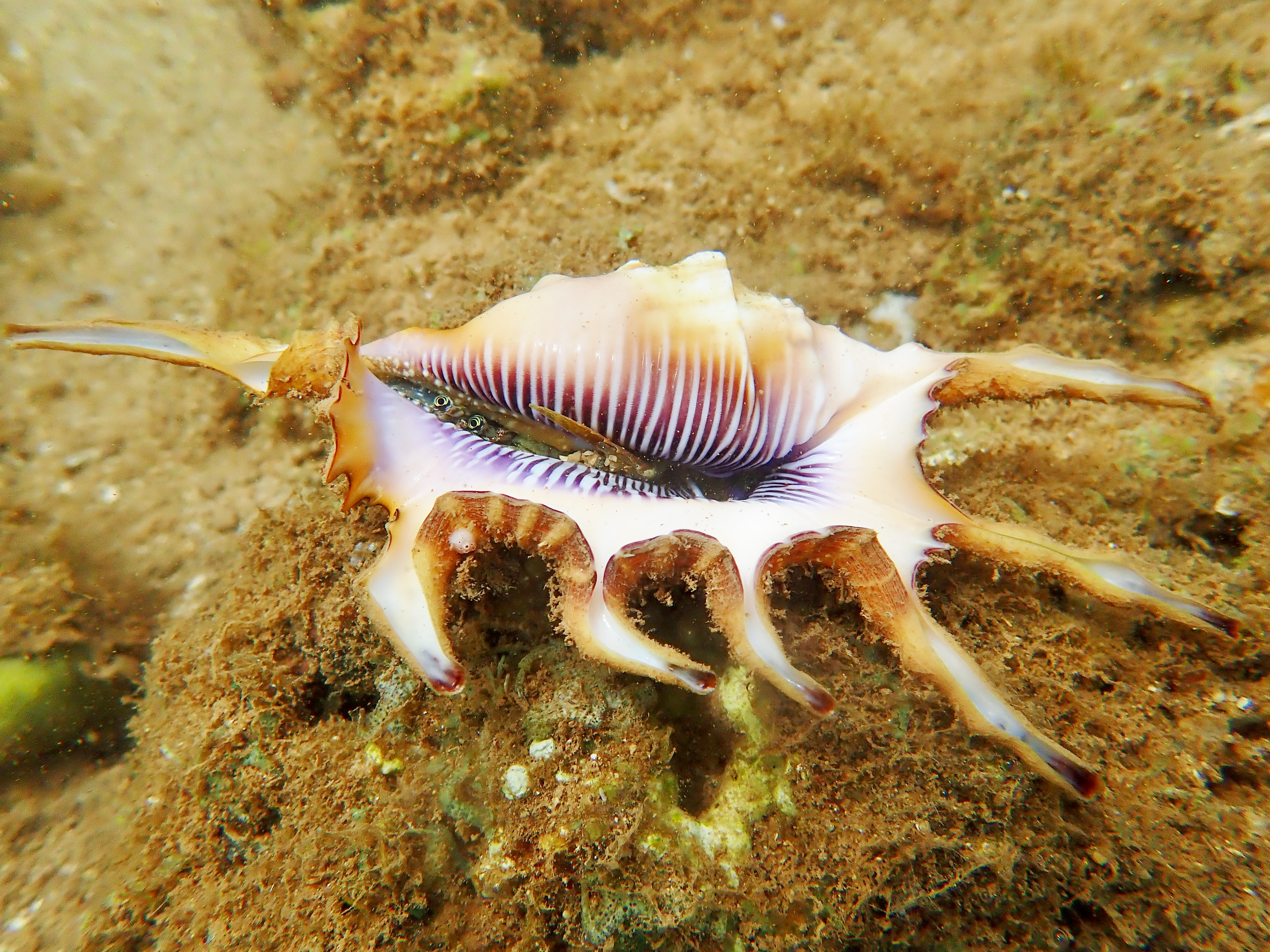
A live scorpion conch (Lambis scorpius) in Mayotte. One can see the eyes as well as the scythe-shaped operculum.

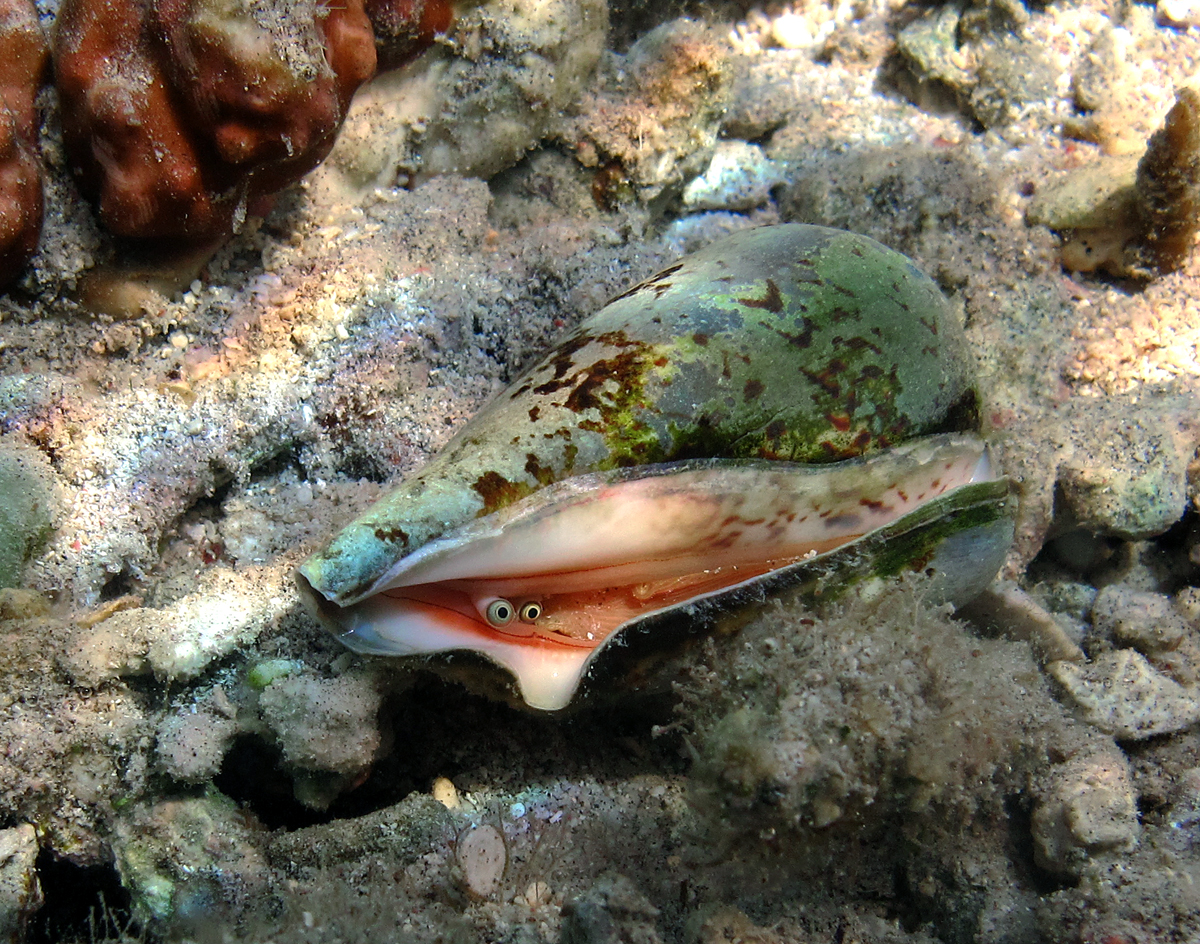
Live Conomurex decorus in La Réunion.

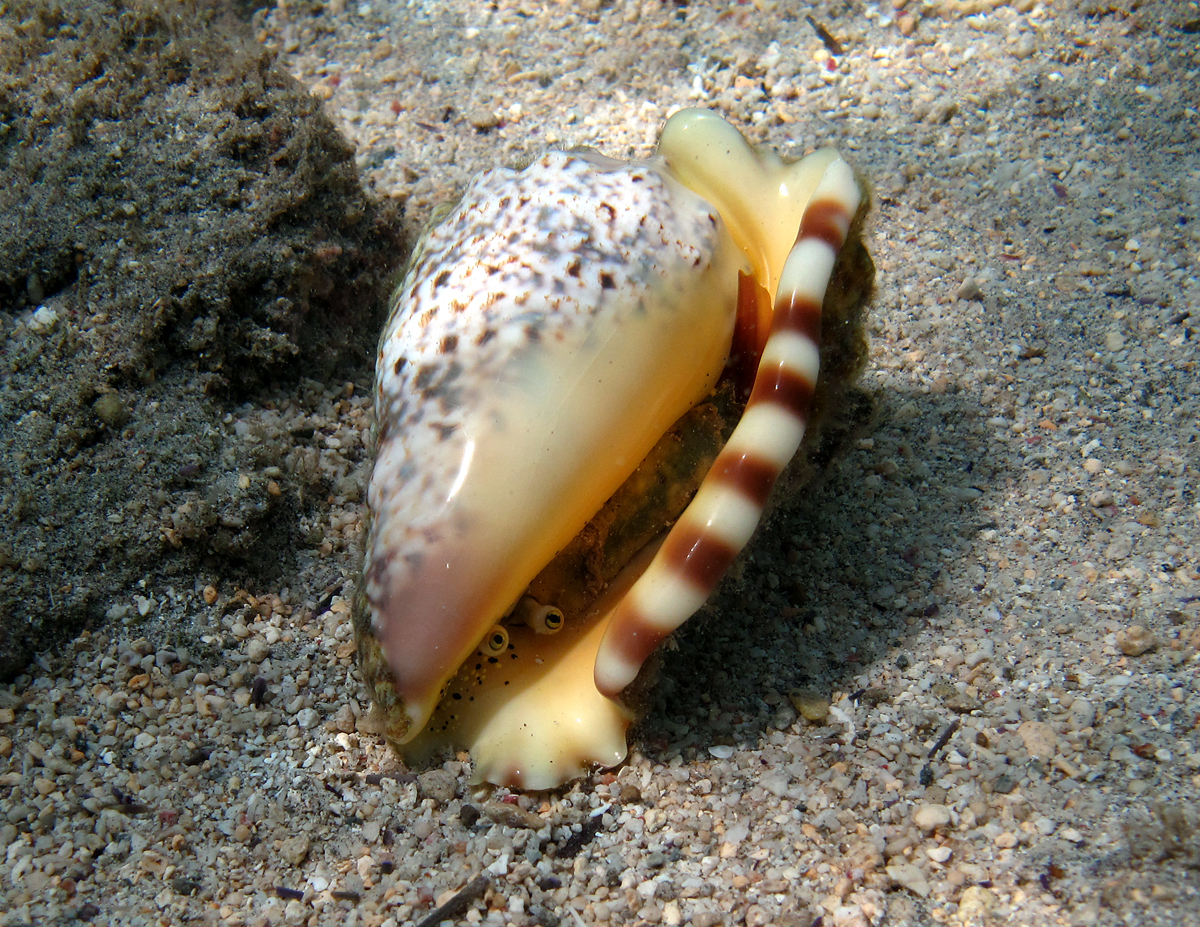
Live Lentigo lentiginosus in La Réunion.

Strombid gastropods live mainly in tropical and subtropical waters. These animals are widespread in the Indo-West Pacific, where most species and genera occur. Nearly 40 of the living species that used to belong to the genus Strombus can be found in the Indo-Pacific region. They also occur in the eastern Pacific and Western Atlantic, and a single species can be found on the African Atlantic coast. Six species of strombids are found in the wider Caribbean region, including the queen conch Aliger gigas, the goliath conch Titanostrombus goliath, the hawk-wing conch Lobatus raninus, the rooster tail conch Aliger gallus, the milk conch Macrostrombus costatus, the West Indian fighting conch Strombus pugilis, and the Florida fighting conch Strombus alatus. Until recently, all of these species were placed in the genus Strombus, but now many species are being moved into new genera.

== Morphology and life habits ==
Strombids have long eye stalks. The shell of a strombid has a long and narrow aperture and a siphonal canal. The shell margin has an indentation near the anterior end which accommodates one of the eye stalks. This indentation is called a strombid or stromboid notch. The stromboid notch may be more or less conspicuous, depending on the species. The shells of most species in this family grow a flared lip upon reaching sexual maturity. They lay eggs in long, gelatinous strands. The genera Strombus and Lambis have many similarities between them, both anatomical and reproductive, though their shells show some conspicuous differences.

Strombids were widely accepted as carnivores by several authors in the 19th century, an erroneous concept that persisted for several decades into the first half of the 20th century. This ideology was probably born in the writings of Lamarck, who classified strombids alongside other supposedly carnivorous snails, and was copied in this by subsequent authors. However, the many claims of those authors were never supported by the observation of animals feeding in their natural habitat. Nowadays, strombids are known to be specialized herbivores and occasional detritivores. They are usually associated with shallow-water reefs and seagrass meadows.

Unlike most snails, which glide slowly across the substrate on their feet, strombid gastropods have a characteristic means of locomotion, using their pointed, sickle-shaped, horny operculum to propel themselves forward in a so-called leaping motion.

Burrowing behavior, in which an individual sinks itself entirely or partially into the substrate, is also frequent among strombid gastropods. The burrowing process itself, which involves distinct sequential movements and sometimes complex behaviors, is very characteristic of each species. Usually, large strombid gastropods, such as the queen conch Eustrombus gigas and the spider conch Lambis lambis, do not bury themselves, except during their juvenile stages. However, smaller species such as Strombus canarium and Strombus epidromis may bury themselves even after adulthood.

== Taxonomy ==
For a long time, all conchs and their allies (the strombids) were classified in only two genera, namely Strombus and Lambis. This classification can still be found in many textbooks and on websites on the internet. Based on morphological and molecular phylogenies in addition to an extensively documented fossil record, both genera have been subdivided into several new genera by different authors.

=== Genera ===
The family Strombidae comprises 31 extant genera and 10 extinct genera (marked with a dagger †).

Extant genera

- Aliger Thiele, 1929
- Barneystrombus Blackwood, 2009
- Canarium Schumacher, 1817
- Conomurex Bayle in P. Fischer, 1884
- Dolomena Wenz, 1940
- Dominus Dekkers & S. J. Maxwell, 2020
- Doxander Wenz, 1940
- Euprotomus Gill, 1870
- Fusistrombus Bandel, 2007
- Gibberulus Jousseaume, 1888
- Harpago Mörch, 1852
- Hawaiistrombus Bandel, 2007
- Labiostrombus Oostingh, 1925
- Laevistrombus Abbott, 1960
- Lambis Röding, 1798
- Latissistrombus Bandel, 2007
- Lentigo Jousseaume, 1886
- Lobatus Swainson, 1837
- Macrostrombus Petuch, 1994
- Maculastrombus Liverani, Maxwell, Dekkers, 2021
- Ministrombus Bandel, 2007
- Mirabilistrombus Kronenberg, 1998
- Ophioglossolambis Dekkers, 2012
- Persististrombus Kronenberg & Lee, 2007
- Strombus Linnaeus, 1758
- Terestrombus Kronenberg & Vermeij, 2002
- Thetystrombus Dekkers, 2008
- Thersistrombus Bandel, 2007
- Titanostrombus Petuch, 1994
- Tricornis Jousseaume, 1886
- Tridentarius Kronenberg & Vermeij, 2002
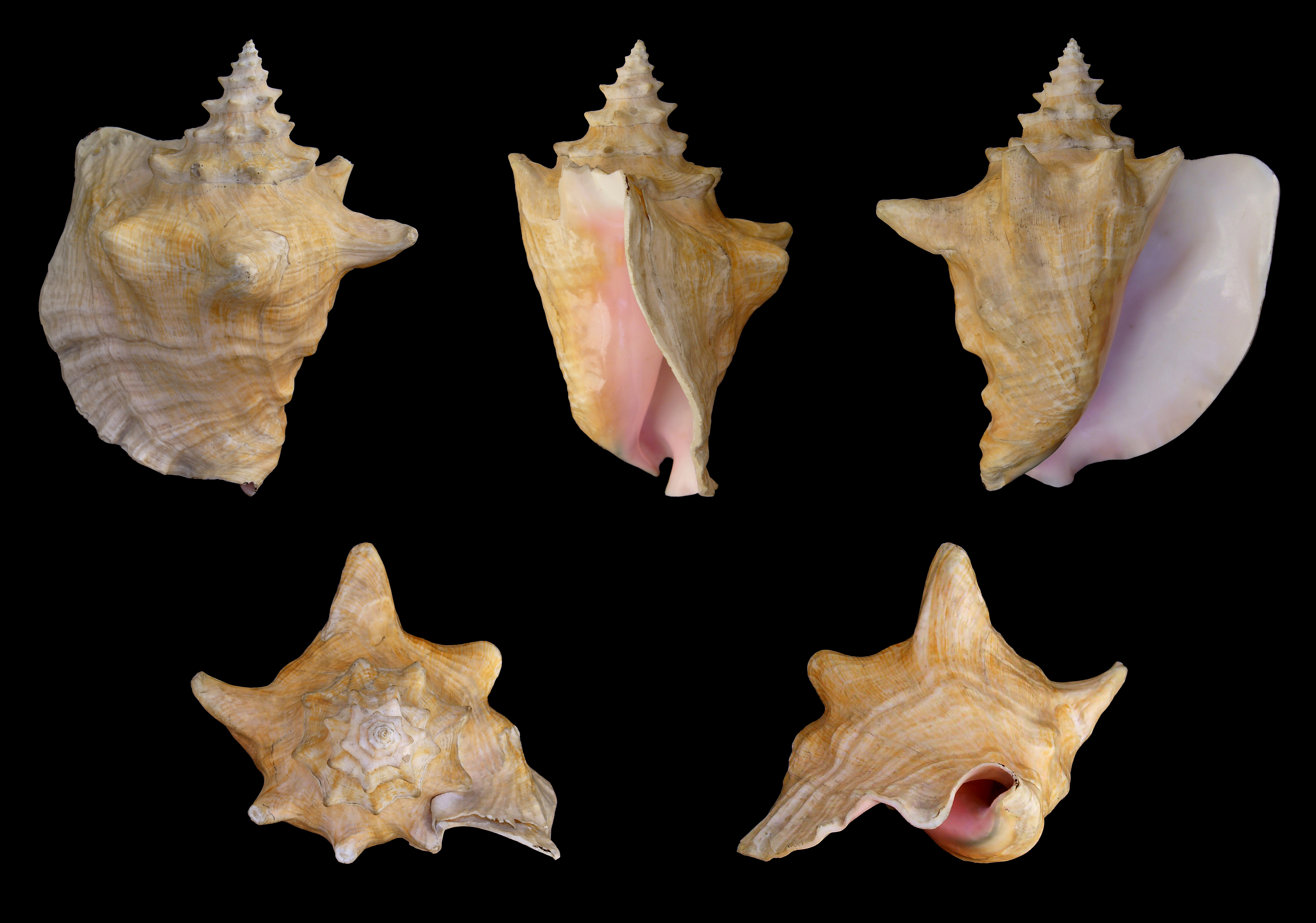
Aliger gigas

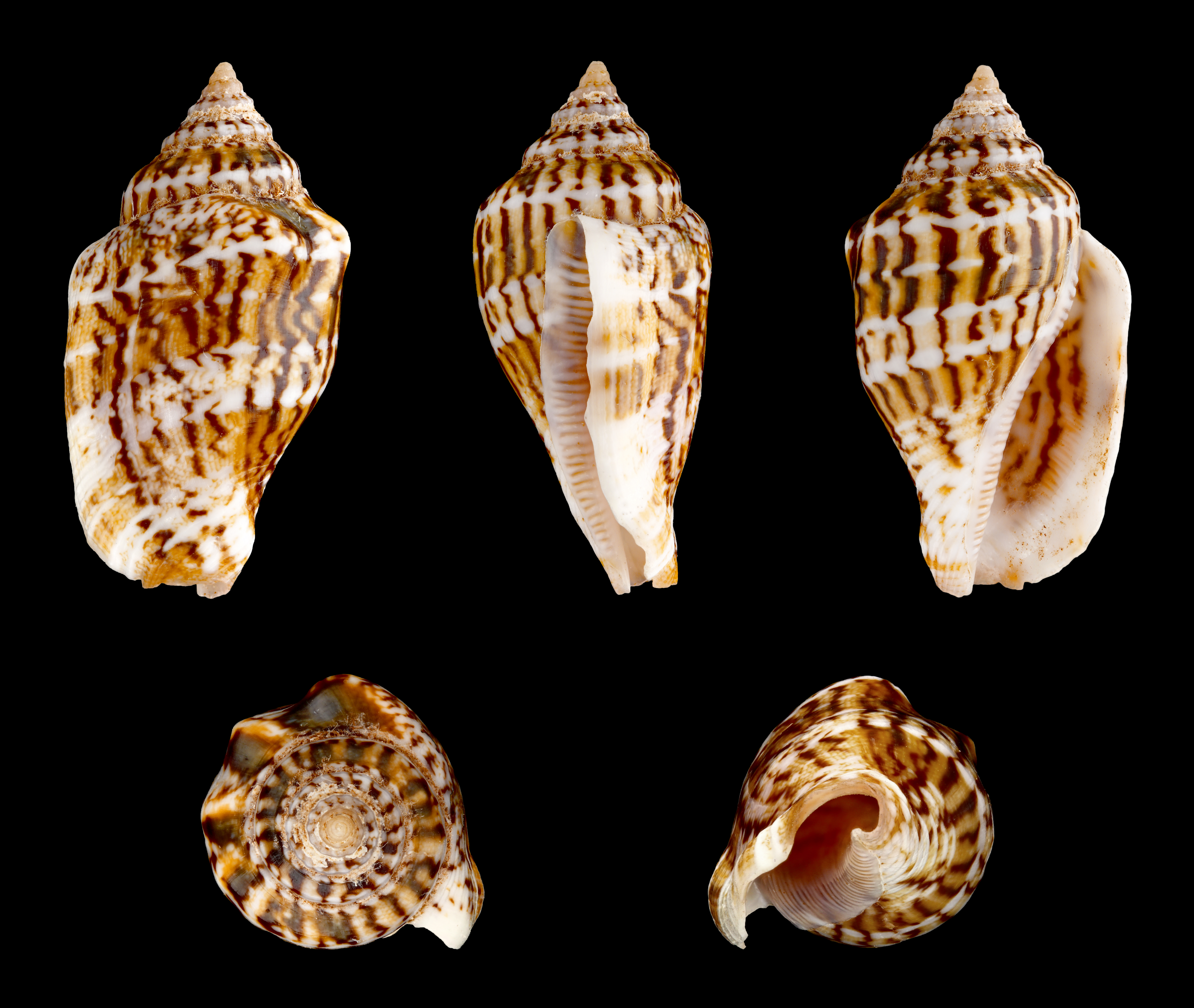
Canarium mutabile

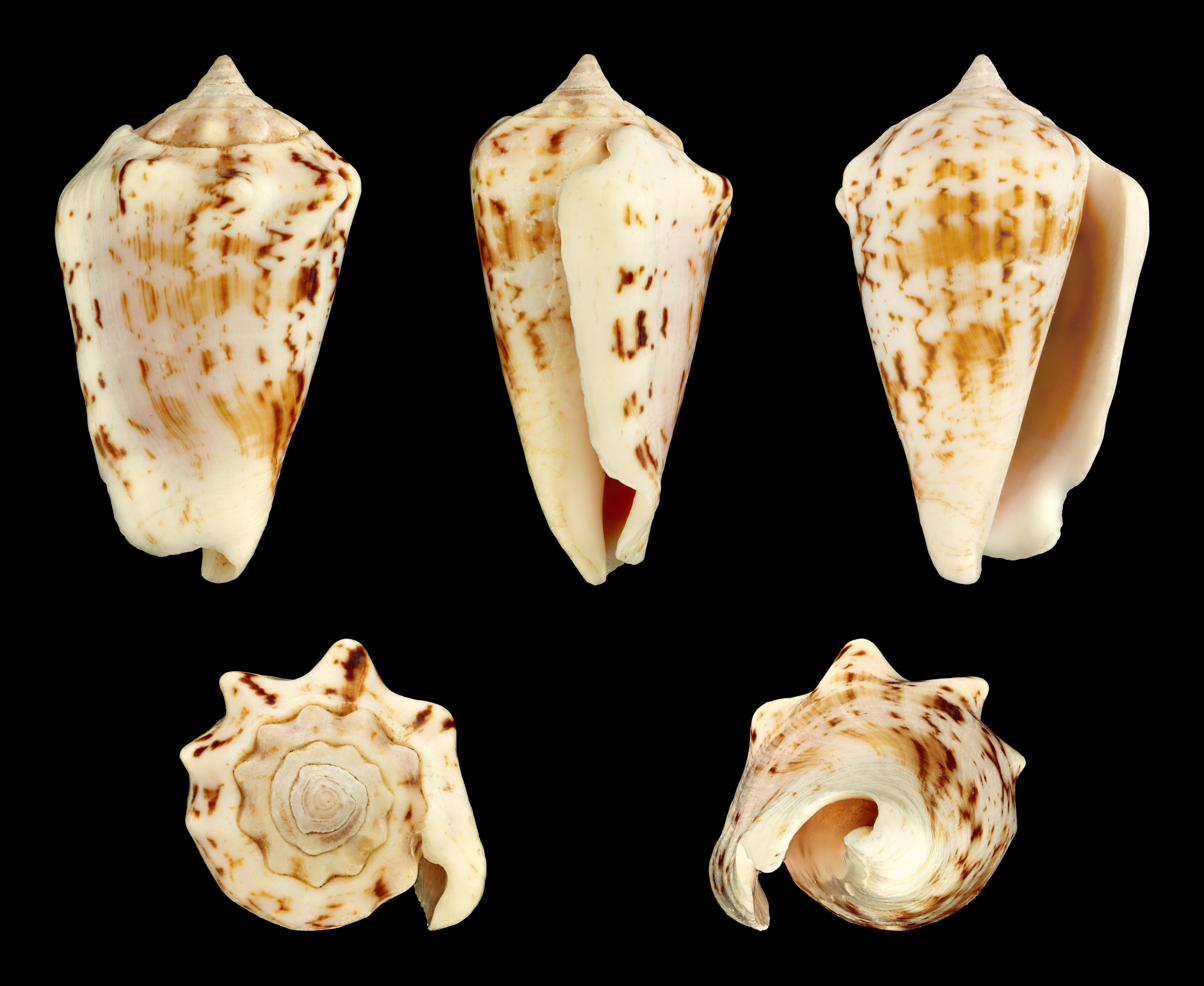
Conomurex decorus

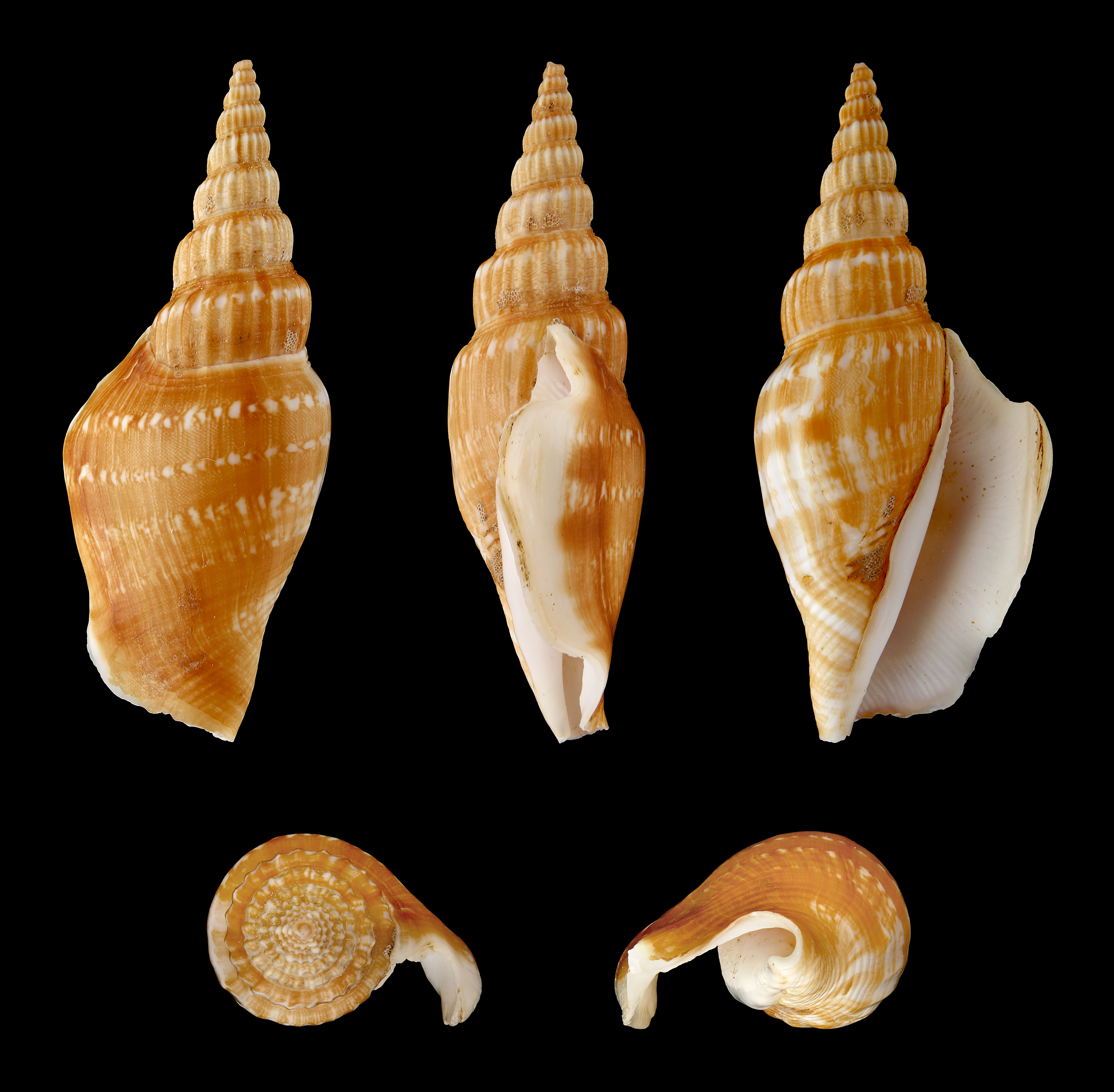
Doxander vittatus

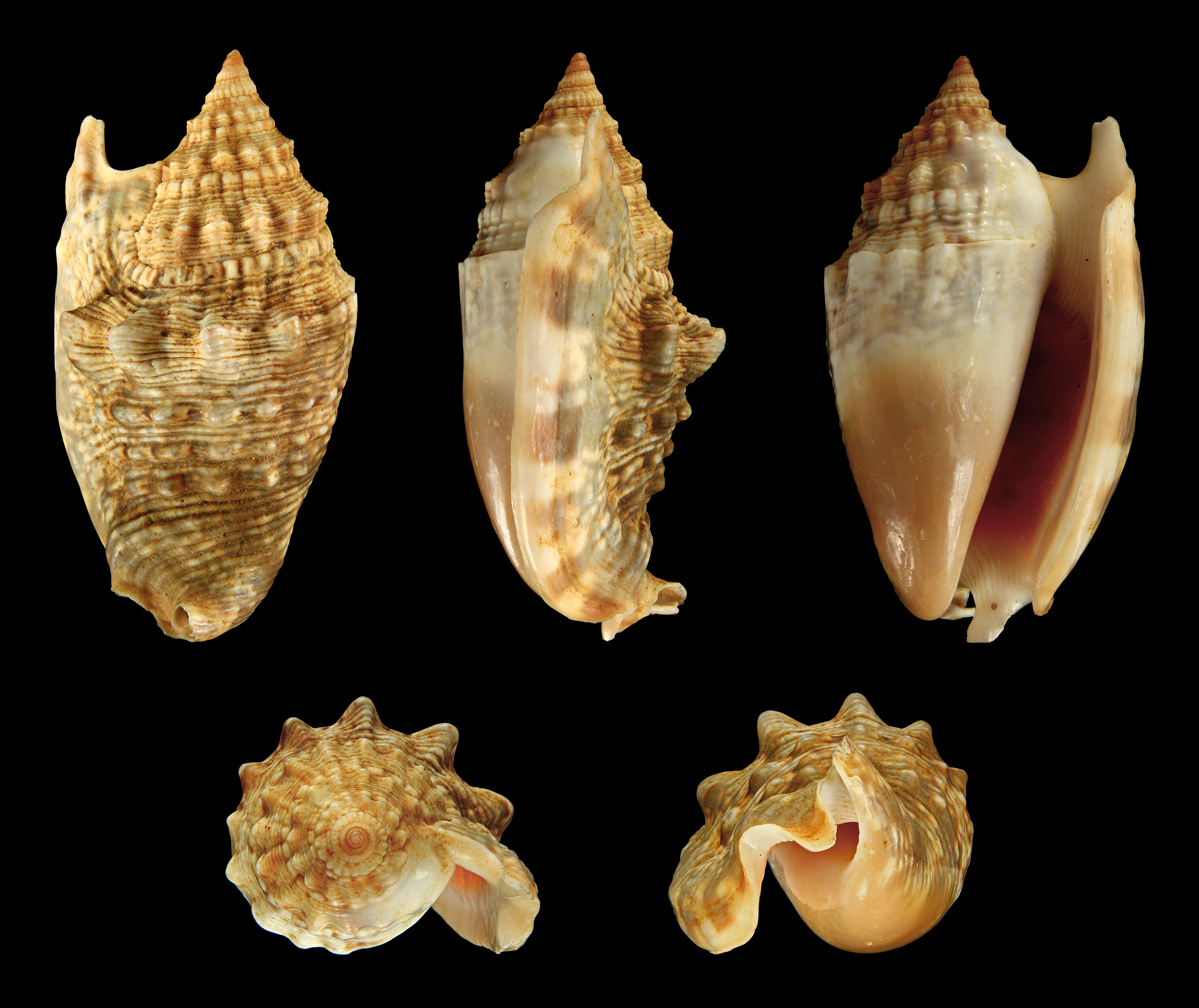
Euprotomus aurisdianae

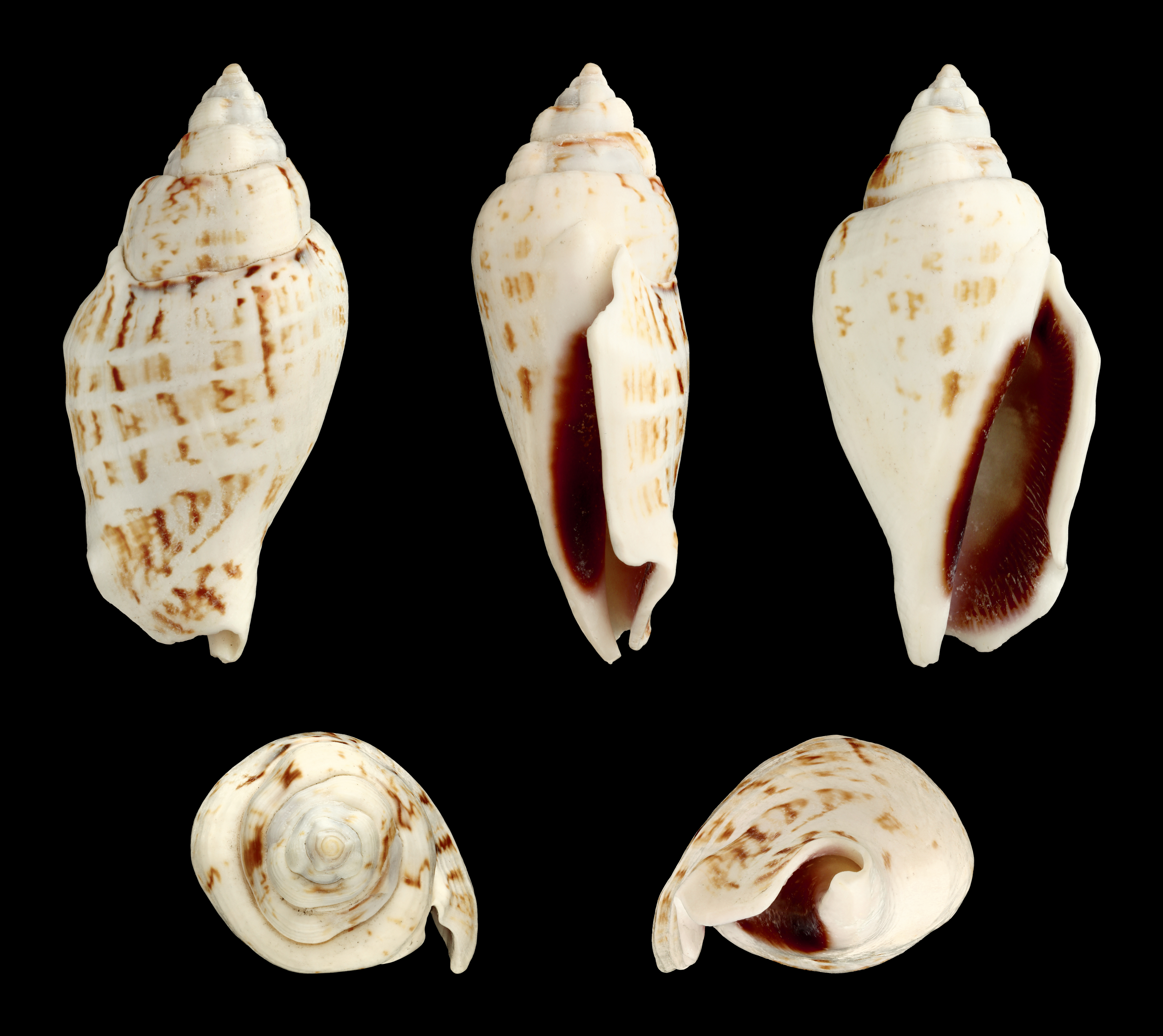
Gibberulus gibbosus

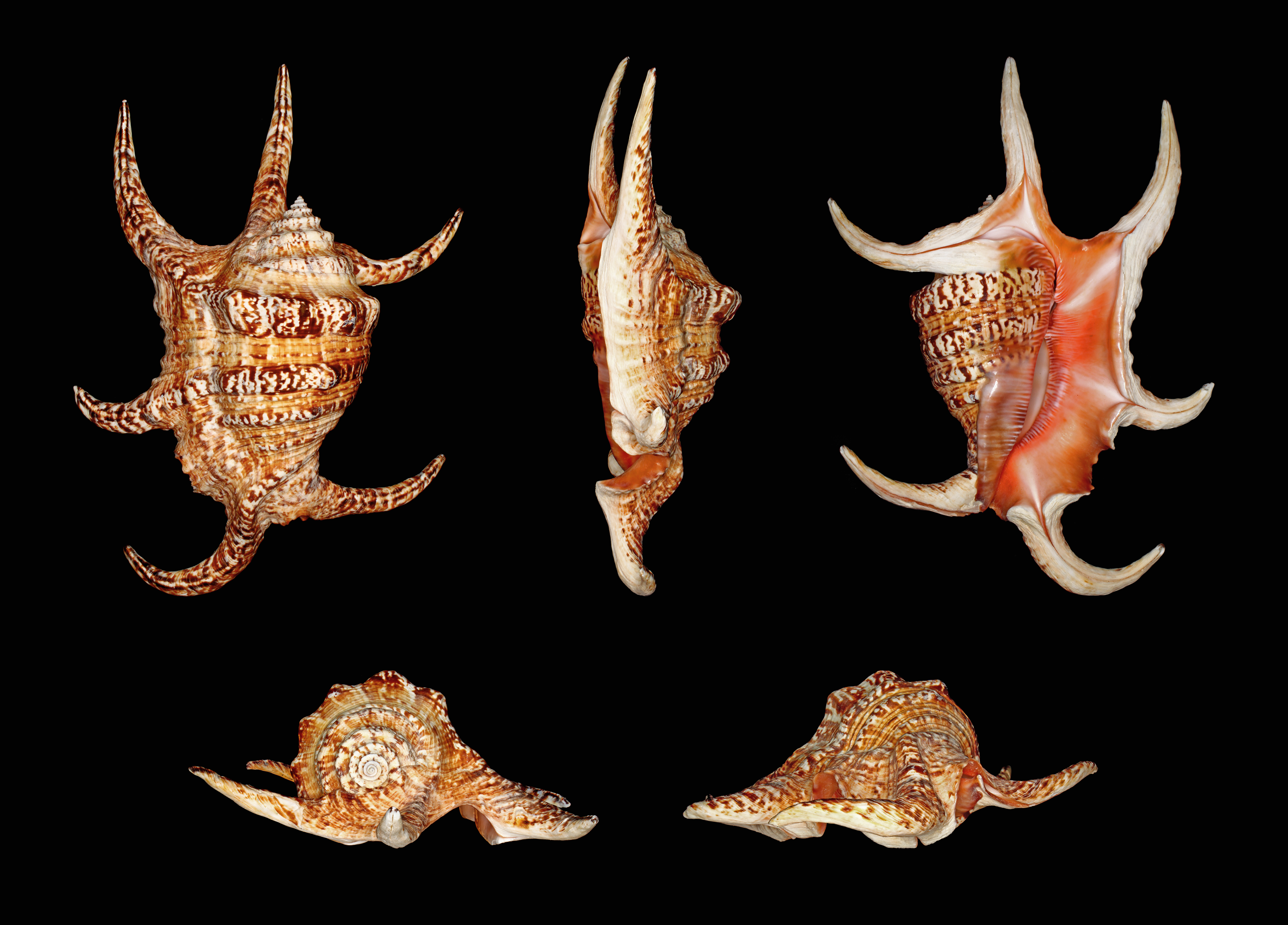
Harpago chiragra

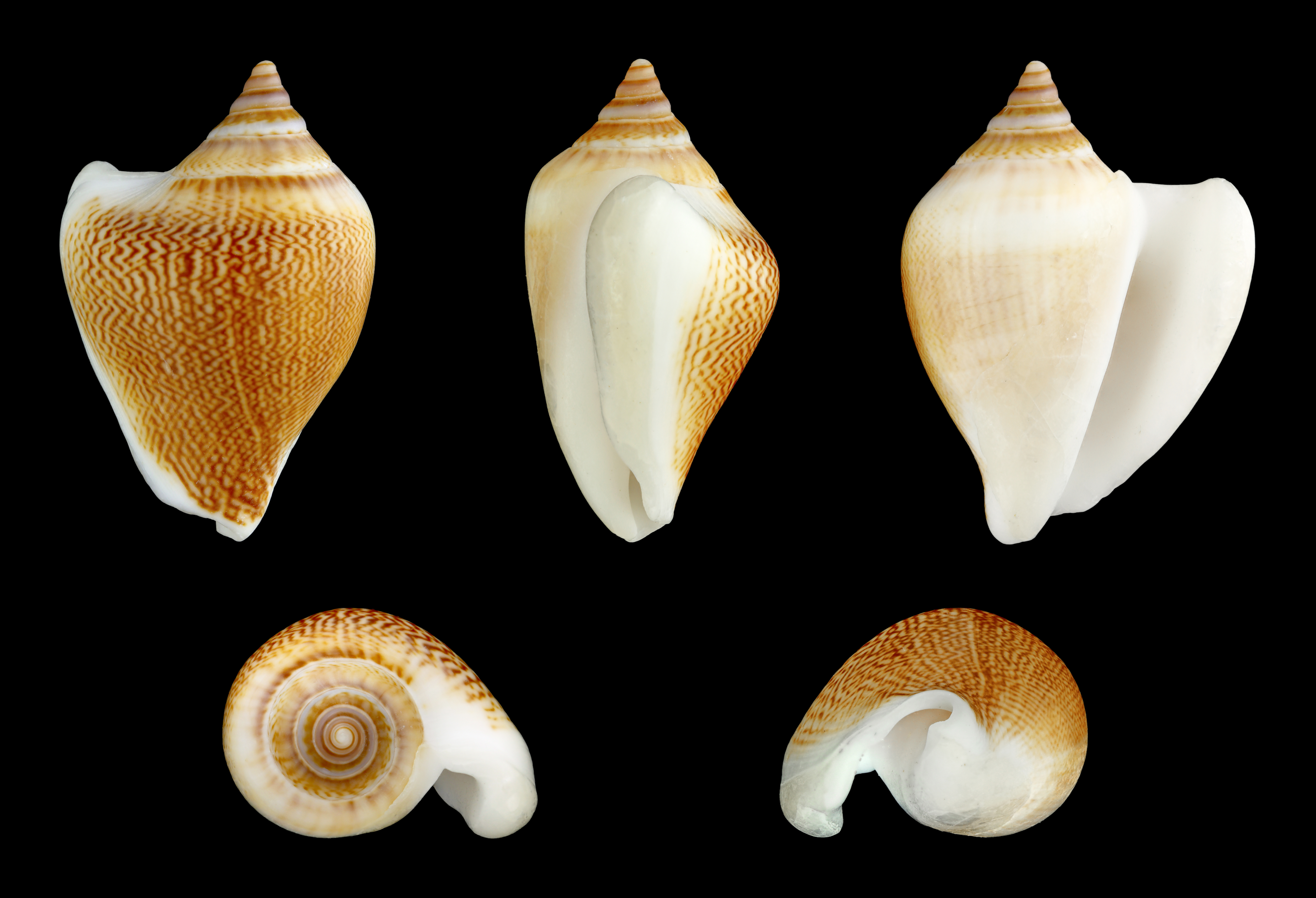
Laevistrombus canarium

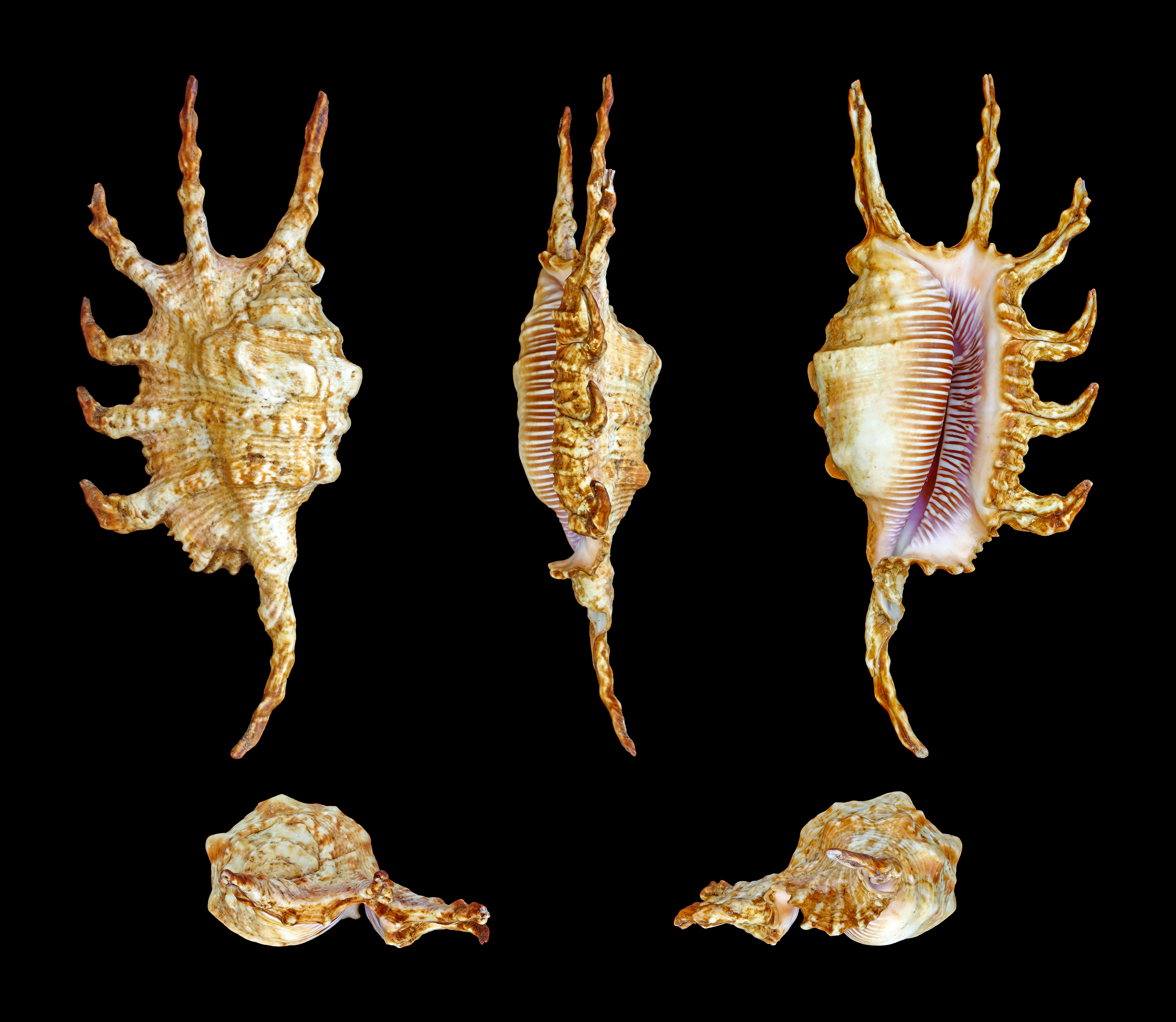
Lambis scorpius

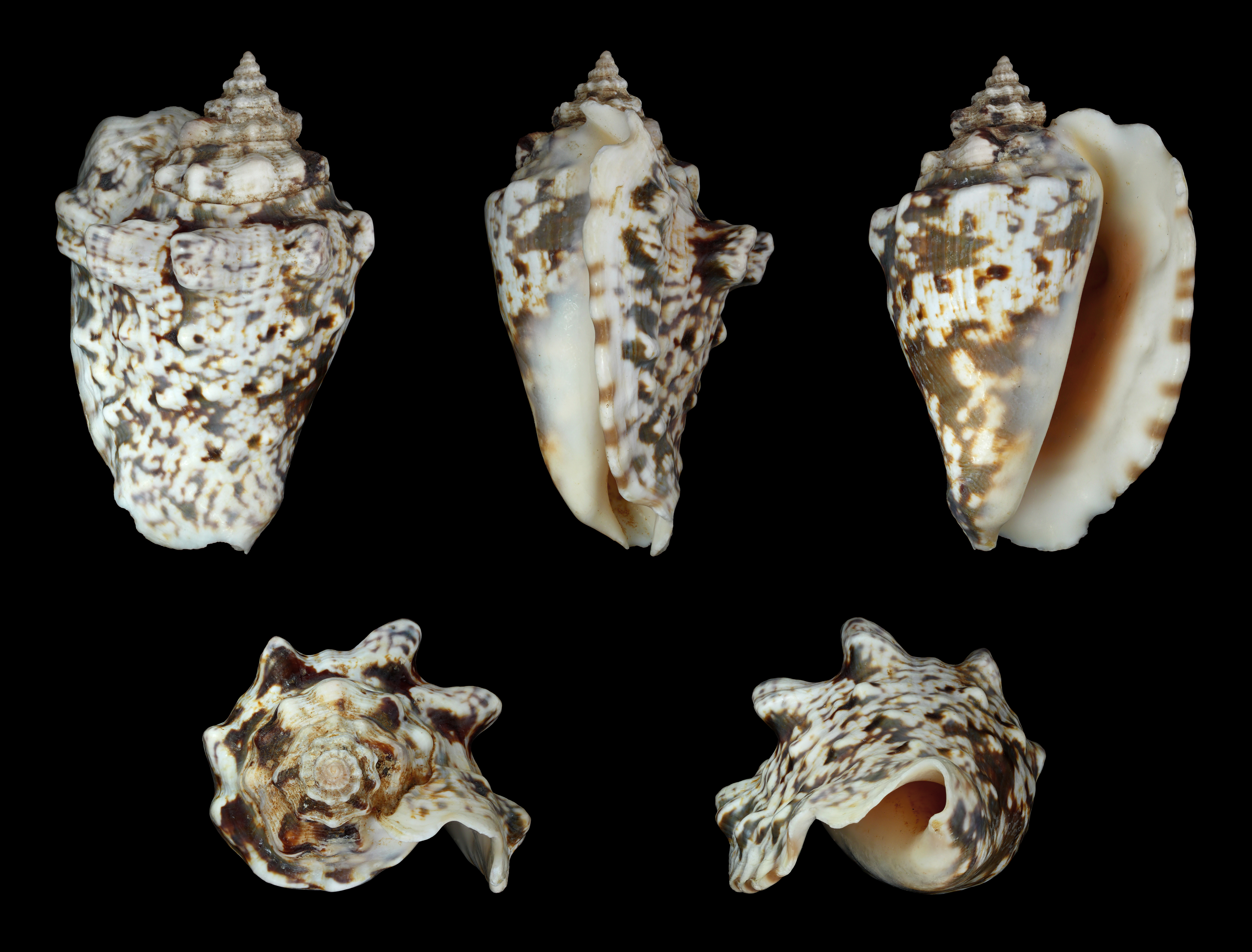
Lentigo lentiginosus

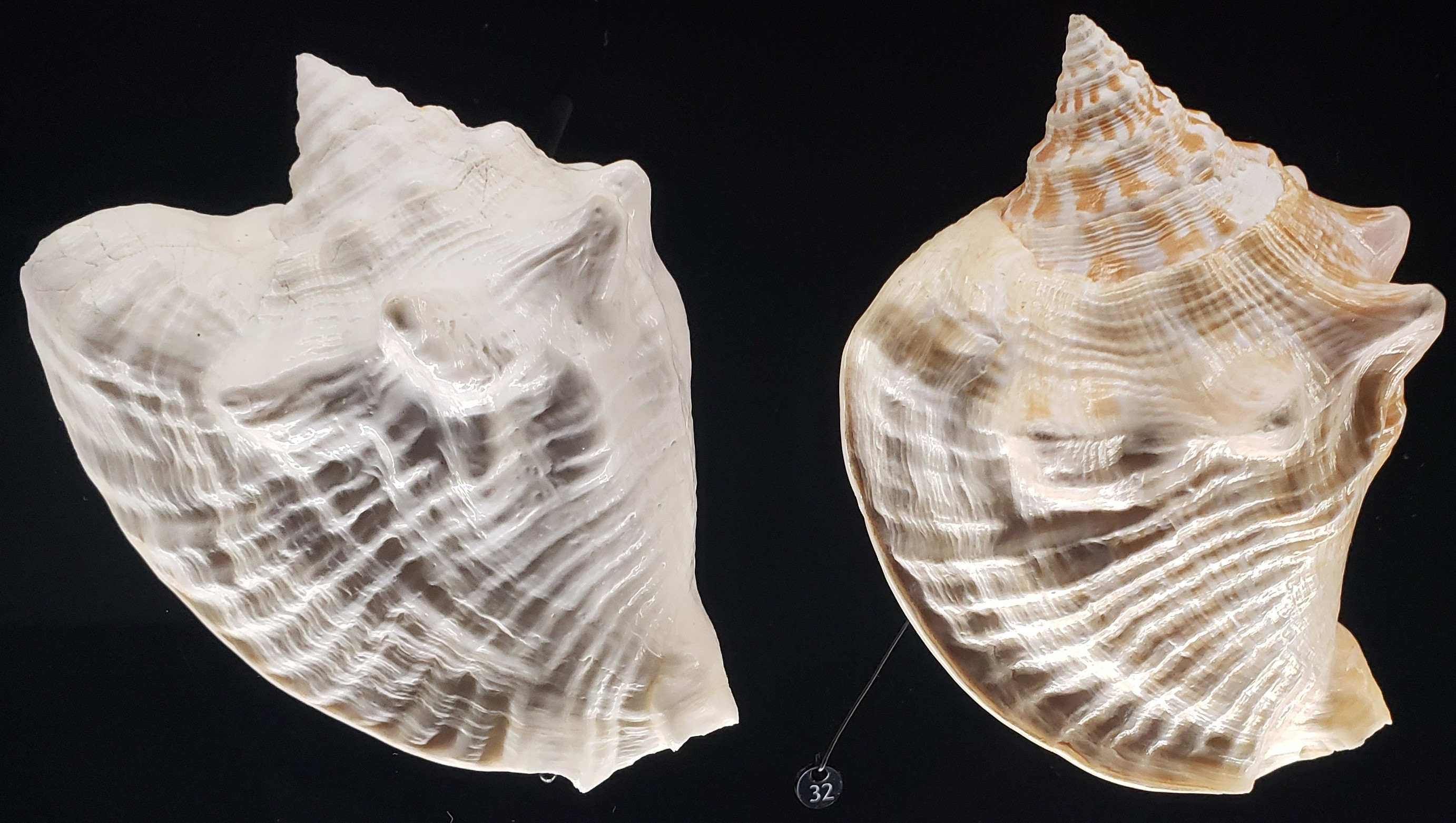
Macrostrombus costatus

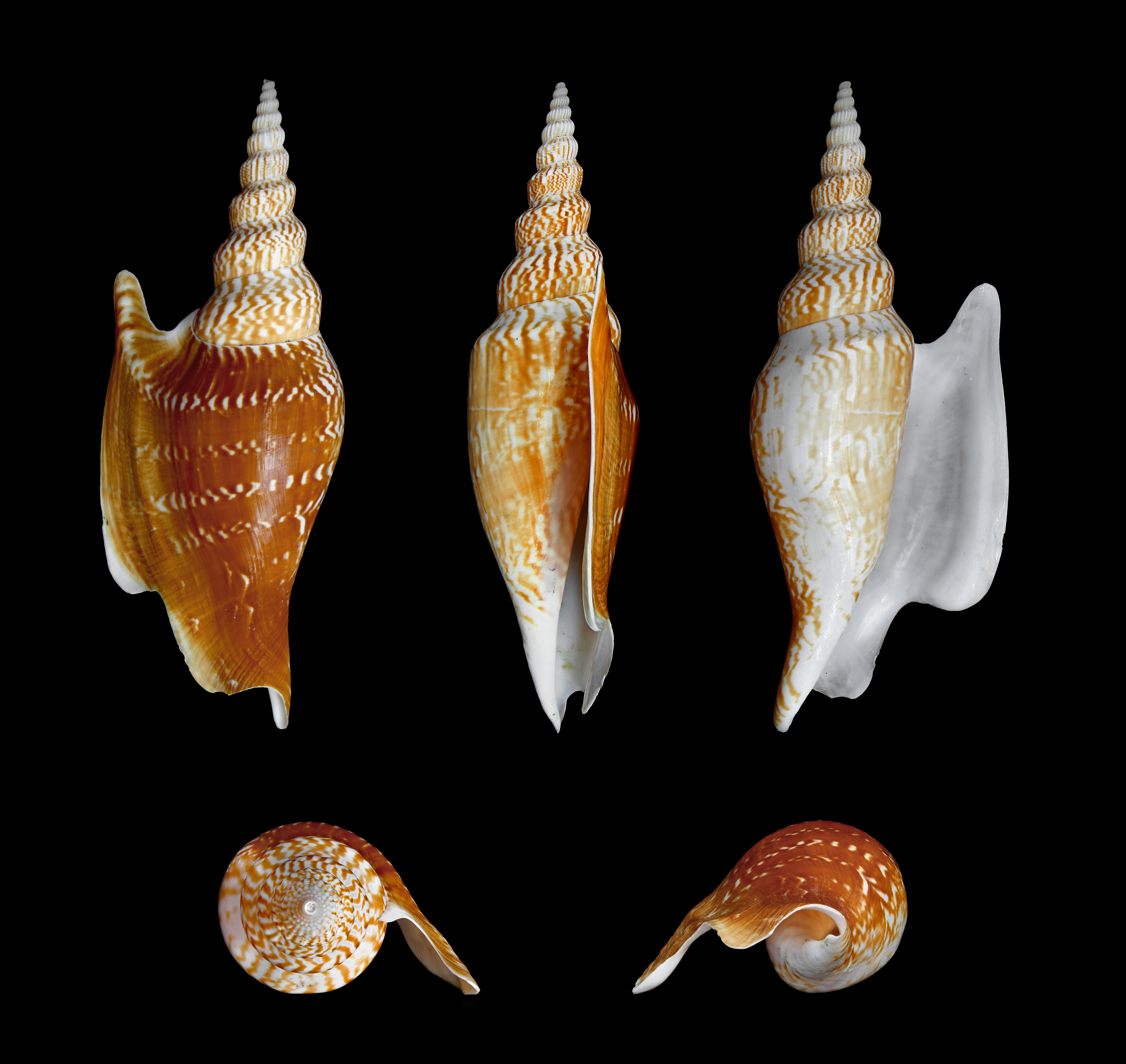
Mirabilistrombus listeri

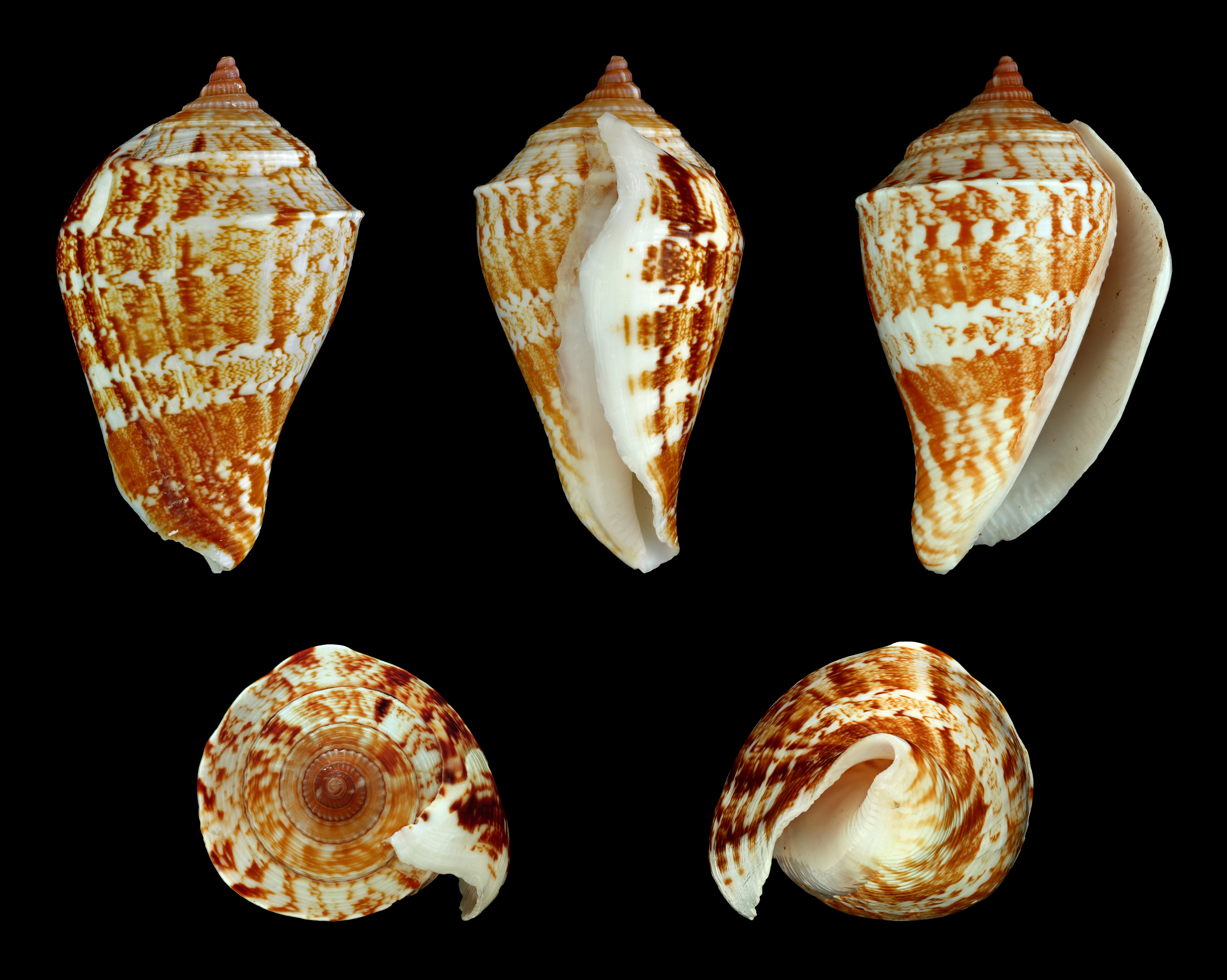
Neodilatilabrum marginatus

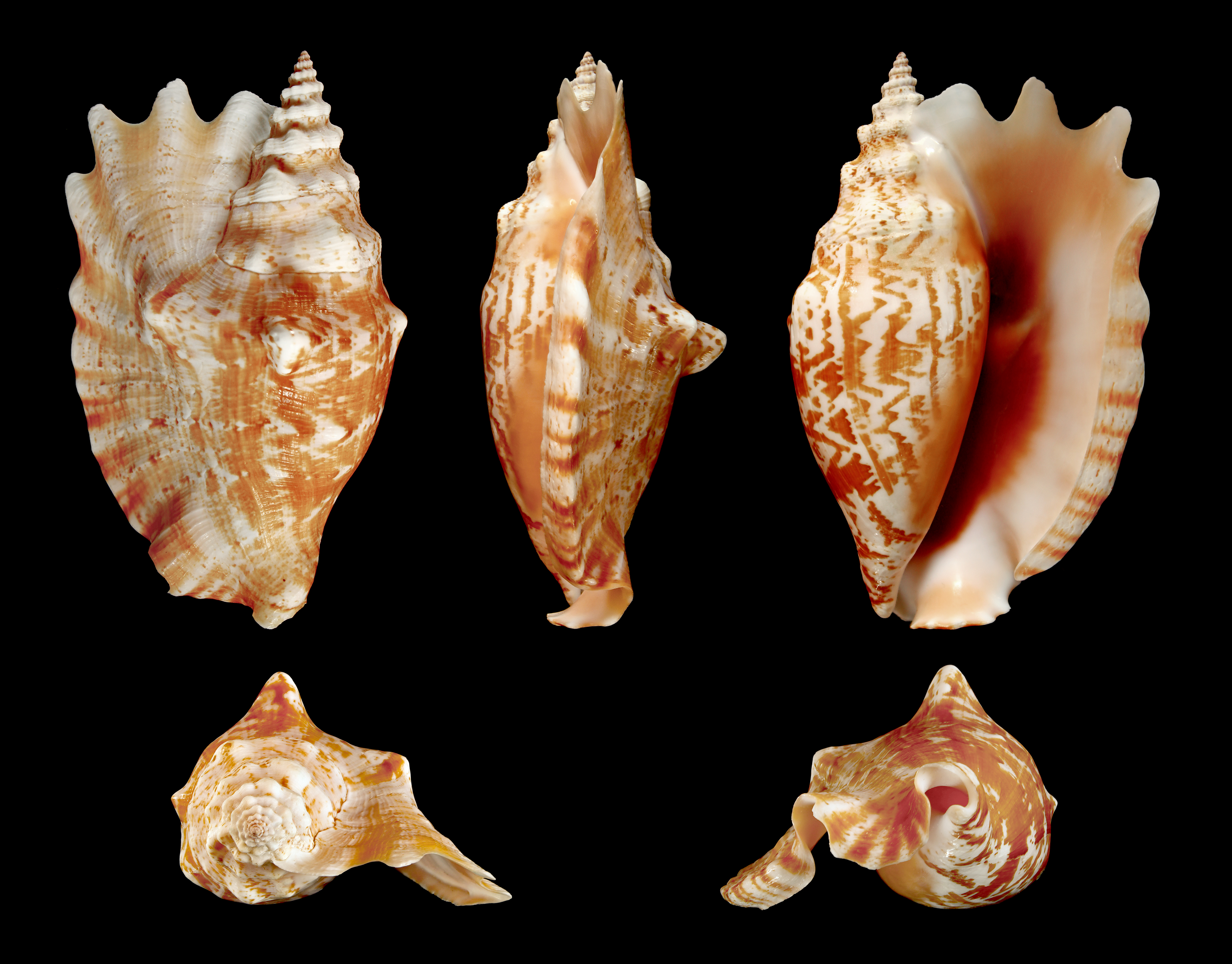
Sinustrombus sinuatus

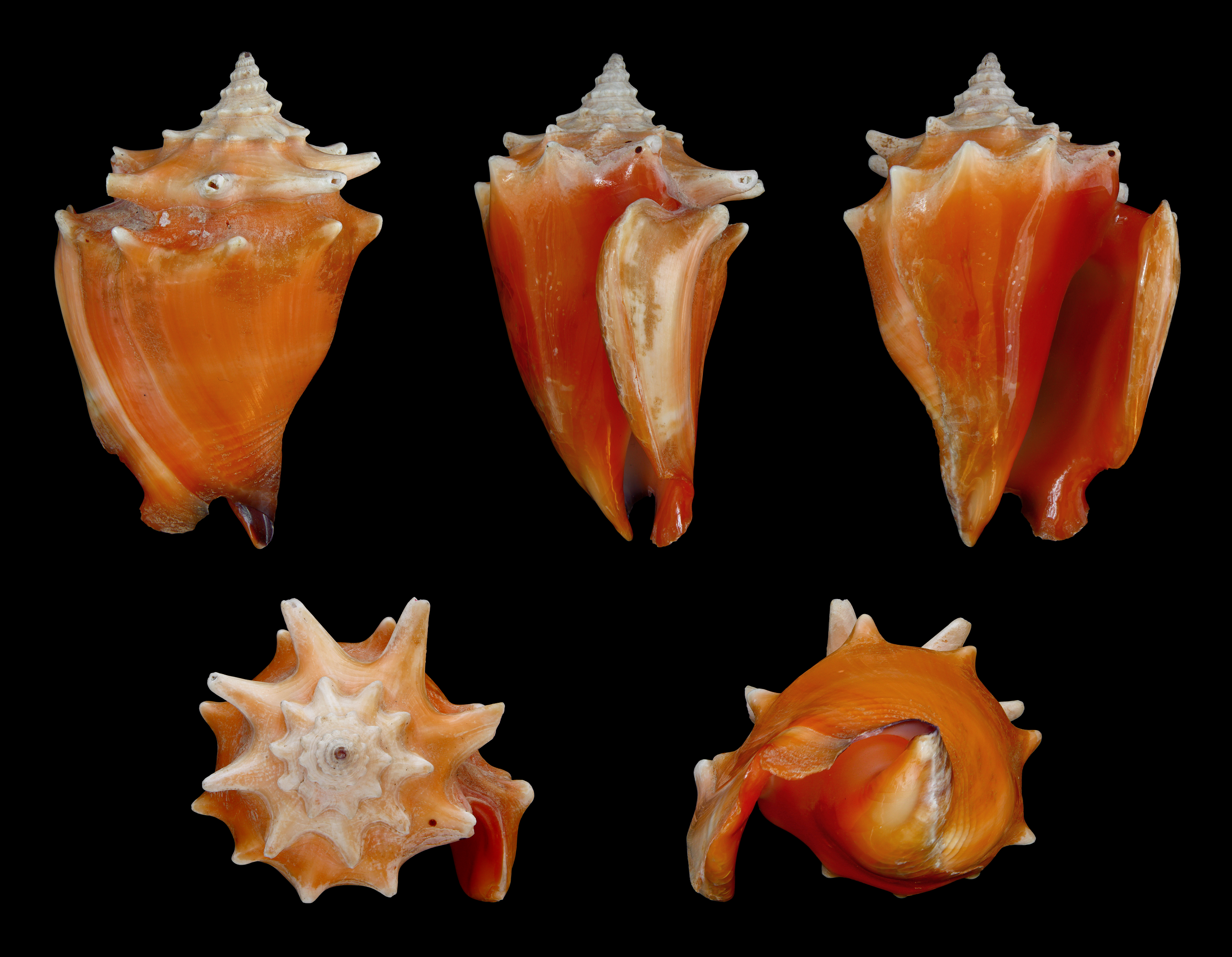
Strombus pugilis

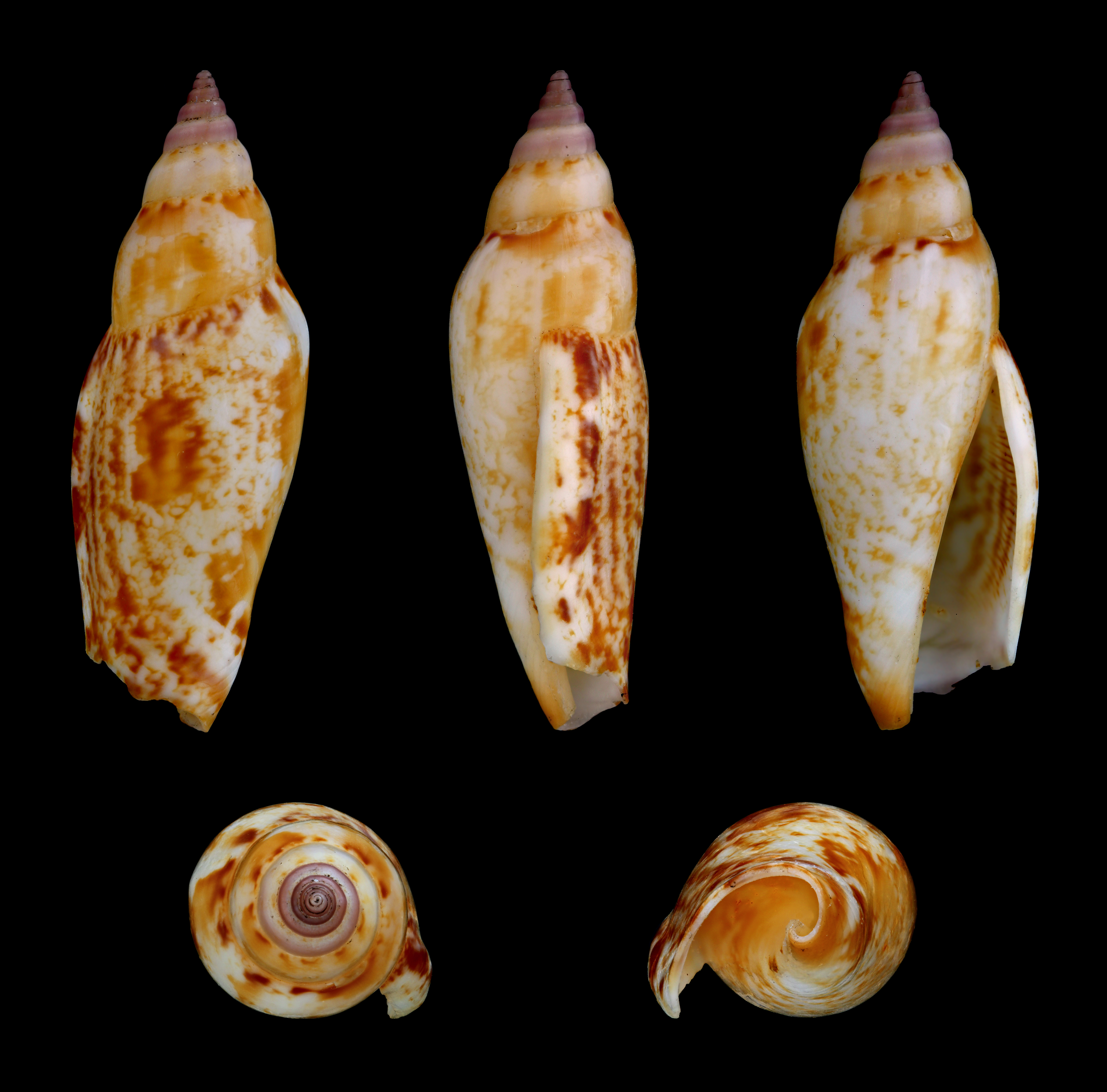
Terestrombus terebellatus

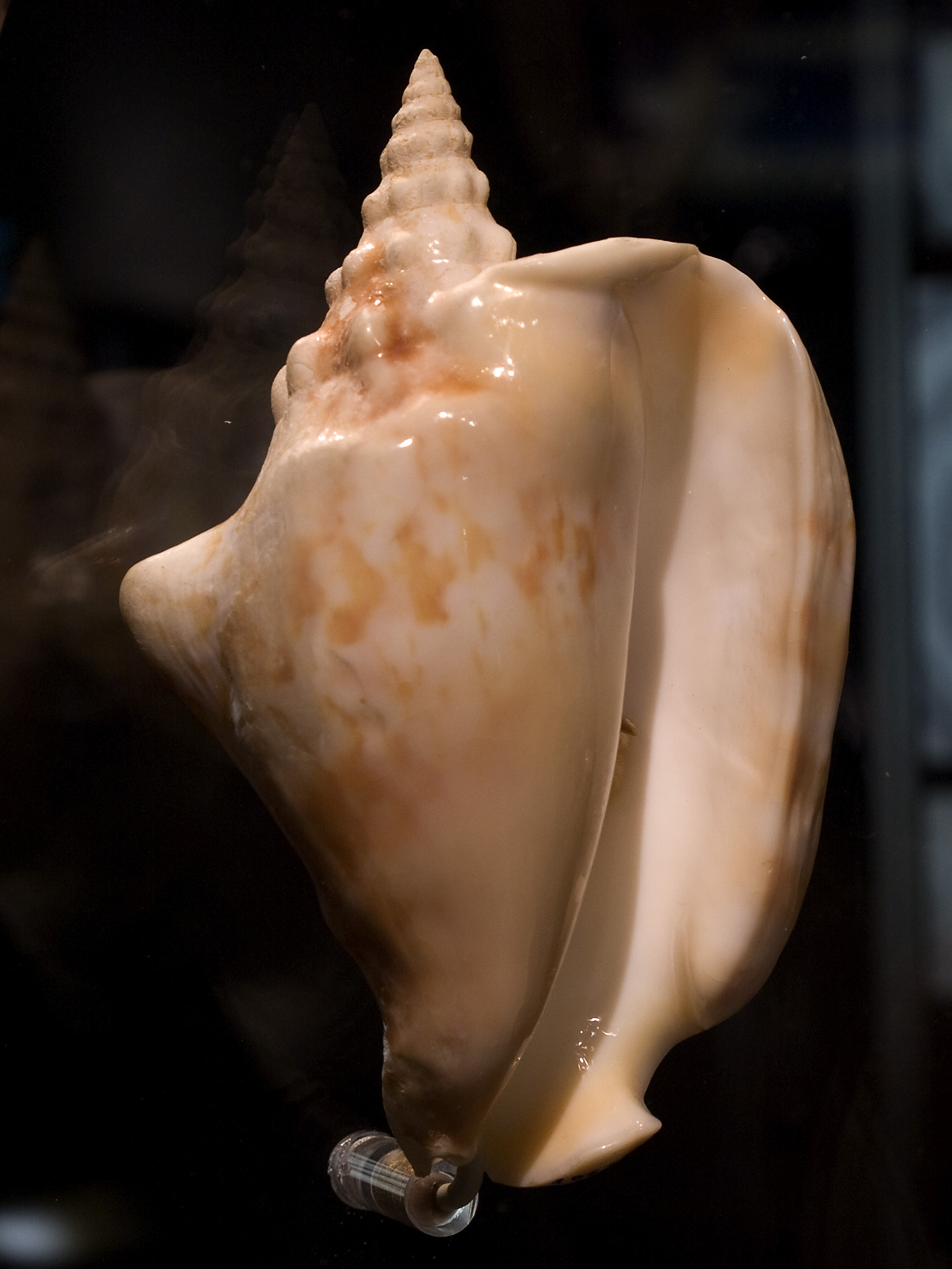
Thersistrombus thersites

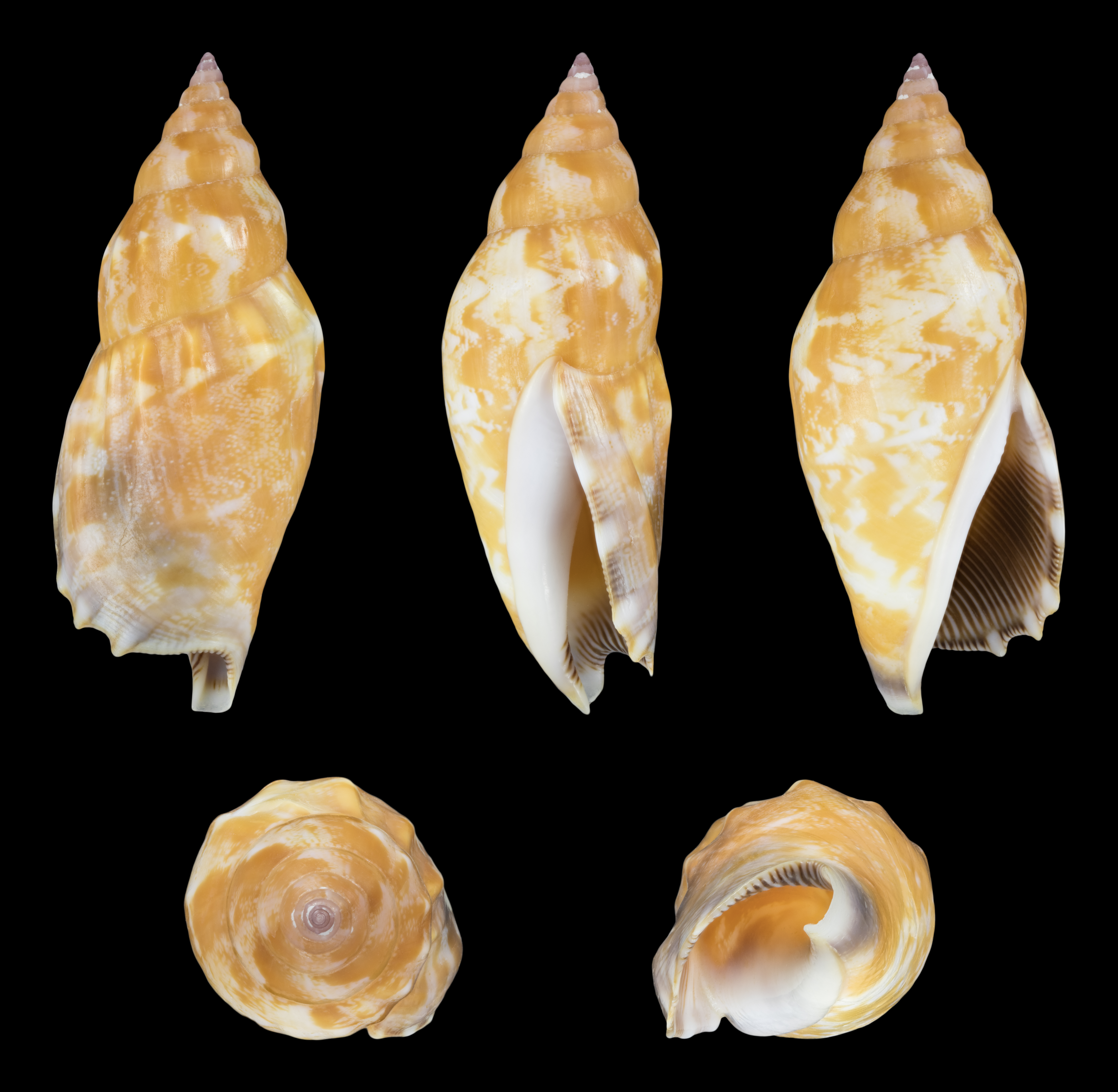
Tridentarius dentatus

Extinct genera

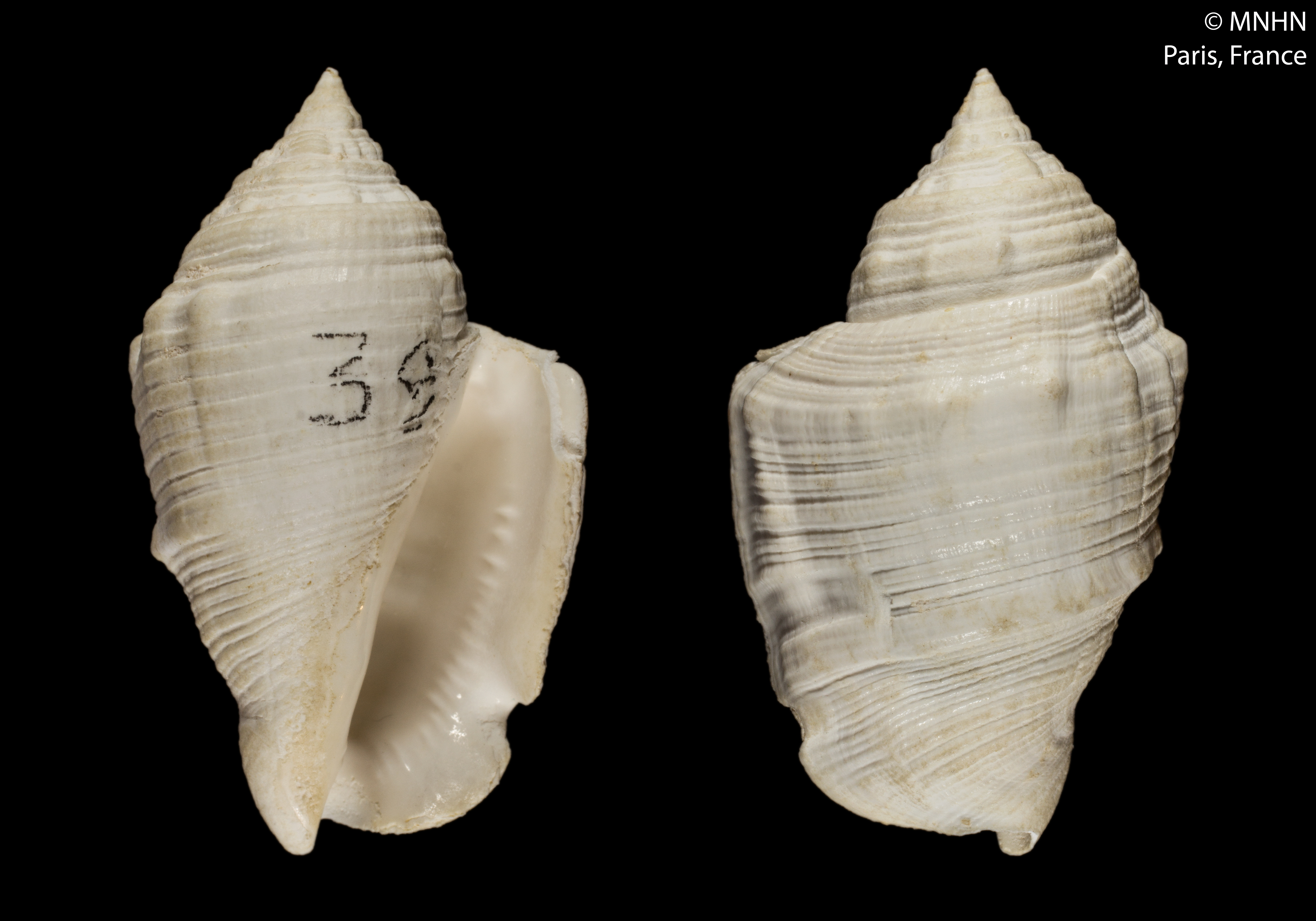
The fossilized holotype of †Striatostrombus blanci held at MNHN, Paris

- † Alatostrombus Raven, 2021
- † Antestrombus S. J. Maxwell, Dekkers, Rymer & Congdon, 2020
- †Austrombus Nielsen, 2005
- †Carinrostrina De Gregorio, 1894
- †Dilatilabrum Cossmann, 1904: belongs to the family † Dilatilabridae
- †Europrotomus Kronenberg & Harzhauser, 2012
- † Indocanarium Thach, 2025
- † Javastrombus Altaba, 2024
- † Jogjacartanus K. Martin, 1931
- † Laevispira Raven, 2021
- † Leiorhinus Gabb, 1860
- † Platyoptera Conrad, 1855
- † Spinatus Dekkers, Liverani, Ćorić, S. J. Maxwell & Landau, 2020
- †Striatostrombus Dekkers & Maxwell, 2018
- †Strombiconus Marks, 1951
- †Stromboconus De Gregorio, 1896
- †Volutostrombus Garvie, 2013
- † Woodringius Dekkers, 2025

Genera brought into synonymy

- Afristrombus Bandel, 2007 is a synonym of Persististrombus Kronenberg & Lee, 2007
- Aliger Thiele, 1929 is a synonym of Lobatus Swainson, 1837
- Decostrombus Bandel, 2007 is a synonym of Conomurex Bayle in P. Fischer, 1884
- Eustrombus Wenz, 1940 is a synonym of Lobatus Swainson, 1837
- Fusistrombus Bandel, 2007 is a synonym of Canarium Schumacher, 1817
- Gallinula Mörch, 1852 is a synonym of Labiostrombus Oostingh, 1925
- Hawaiistrombus Bandel, 2007 is a synonym of Canarium Schumacher, 1817
- Heptadactylus Mörch, 1852 is a synonym of Lambis Röding, 1798
- Latissistrombus Bandel, 2007 is a synonym of Sinustrombus Bandel, 2007
- Millipes Mörch, 1852 is a synonym of Lambis Röding, 1798
- Ministrombus Bandel, 2007 is a synonym of Dolomena Wenz, 1940
- Monodactylus Mörch, 1852 is a synonym of Euprotomus Gill, 1870
- Margistrombus Bandel, 2007 is a synonym of Neodilatilabrum Dekkers, 2008
- Neodilatilabrum Dekkers, 2012: synonym of Dolomena Wenz, 1940 (junior subjective synonym)
- Pterocera Lamarck, 1799 is a synonym of Lambis Röding, 1798
- Pyramis Röding, 1798 is a synonym of Strombus Linnaeus, 1758
- Solidistrombus Dekkers, 2008 is a synonym of Sinustrombus Bandel, 2007
- Strombella Schlüter, 1838 is a synonym of Strombus Linnaeus, 1758
- Strombidea Swainson, 1840 is a synonym of Canarium Schumacher, 1817

== Phylogeny ==
- Strombidae
  - Terebellum terebellum
  - - Canarium urceus
    - - Conomurex luhuanus
      - - Tricornis raninus
        - - Lambis lambis
          - - Strombus
            - - Eustrombus
              - Aliger

Phylogeny and relationships of the Strombidae according to Simone (2005)

The evolutionary relationships within the family Strombidae have been studied multiple times using various scientific approaches. One important contribution came in 2005, when Brazilian malacologist Luiz Ricardo L. Simone published a detailed monograph analyzing the morphology and anatomy of several related families: Aporrhaidae, Strombidae, Xenophoridae, and Struthiolariidae. In this work, Simone identified the Strombidae as a monophyletic group, meaning all its members descend from a common ancestor and share unique traits not found in other groups. He based this conclusion on 13 shared derived traits (called synapomorphies) and recognized at least eight distinct genera within the family. Simone considered the genus Terebellum to be the most primitive (or basal) member of the Strombidae. It stood apart from other strombids by its own set of 13 unique features, such as having a rounded foot. Although Tibia was not included in his formal analysis, Simone believed it was closely related to Terebellum due to morphological similarities. Most of the genera analyzed, except for Lambis, had traditionally been grouped under the broad genus Strombus (sensu lato). However, Simone found that only three species, Strombus gracilior, Strombus alatus, and Strombus pugilis (the type species of Strombus) fit the stricter definition of the genus, based on at least five defining characteristics. The other species, which had often been treated as subgenera, were elevated to full genus status. For instance, Eustrombus (now generally regarded as a synonym of Lobatus) included species like Eustrombus gigas and Eustrombus goliath (now called Aliger gigas and Titanostrombus goliath, respectively). Likewise, the genus Aliger included species such as Aliger costatus and Aliger gallus, the former of which is now treated under Macrostrombus. The remaining taxa were previously considered as subgenera, and were elevated to genus level by Simone in the end of his analysis. The genus Eustrombus (now considered a synonym of Lobatus), in this case, included Eustrombus gigas (now considered a synonym of Lobatus gigas) and Eustrombus goliath (= Lobatus goliath); similarly, the genus Aliger included Aliger costatus (= Lobatus costatus) and Aliger gallus (= Lobatus gallus).

- - - - Eastern Pacific and Atlantic
        - - - - - - Strombus gallus
                  - Strombus gigas
                - Strombus costatus
              - - Strombus raninus
                - Strombus peruvianus
            - Strombus galeatus
          - Strombus latus
        - - - - Strombus pugilis
              - Strombus alatus
            - Strombus gracilior
          - Strombus granulatus
      - - - Strombus bulla
          - Strombus aurisdianae
        - Strombus vomer
    - - Strombus gibberulus
      - Strombus luhuanus
  - - Lambis
      - - Lambis chiragra
        - Lambis truncata
      - Lambis lambis
    - - Strombus taurus
      - Strombus sinuatus
- - - - - - - Strombus maculatus
            - Strombus mutabilis
          - - Strombus microurceus
            - Strombus labiatus
        - - - Strombus fragilis
            - Strombus urceus
          - Strombus dentatus
      - - - Strombus canarium
          - Strombus vittatus
        - Strombus epidromis
    - - Strombus fusiformis
      - Strombus haemostoma
  - Strombus wilsoni

Phylogeny and relationships of Strombidae according to Latiolais (2006)

A different approach, this time based on sequences of nuclear histone H3 and mitochondrial cytochrome-c oxidase I (COI) genes, was proposed by Latiolais and colleagues in a 2006 paper. The analysis included 32 strombid species that used to, or still belong in the genera Strombus and Lambis. Despite issues with individual gene cladograms, the combined analyses were statistically congruent and reasonably represented the phylogeny of Strombus and Lambis. The findings indicated that Strombus s.l. as defined by Abbott in 1961 was paraphyletic, supporting an earlier suggestion that Strombus s.l. was polyphyletic. Relationships within Lambis were consistent with Stone’s (2001) systematics, although Abbott’s subgeneric classifications did not align with the new phylogeny. Based on strong statistical support, the study also proposed that Tricornis might be the sister group to Lambis. Further, the study found mixed support for uniting many strombid subgenera based on a glazed lip character, with some taxa lacking outer lip glazing but still clustering with those that possess it, suggesting that the character might be homoplasious among strombids. While the study was not able to fully test the monophyly of all subgenera defined by Abbott, it indicated that some, such as Tricornis and Lentigo, might not be monophyletic.

In 2019, Maxwell and colleagues proposed a new crown clade known as Neostromboidea to differentiate Strombidae, Rostellariidae, and Seraphsidae from their sister families Struthiolariidae and Aporrhaidae. This revision was based on distinct morphological similarities, including the position of the eye, foot shape, radular configuration, and shell structures. Members of the proposed clade Neostromboidea are characterized by having eyes situated at the tips of peduncles, with a cephalic tentacle located near its distal end. Their foot is laterally compressed, and their shells exhibit a stromboid notch that allows the pedunculated eyes to protrude. In contrast, Struthiolariidae and Aporrhaidae possess a broader, flattened foot and have eyes located at the base of their tentacles, not on peduncles. These families also lack the anterior notch found on Neostromboidea shells. According to the authors, these structural differences reflect the distinct life habits and evolutionary histories of these groups.

== Fossil record and geological history ==
Strombids are estimated to have originated during the Cretaceous period based on recent time-calibrated molecular phylogenetic hypothesis. This would in turn mean that the group's origin would predate the oldest known strombid fossil by at least 59 million years, a discrepancy that could either be explained by methodological inadequacies or an incomplete fossil record. The currently known fossil record reveals an increase in the number of strombid genera during the Miocene epoch, a pattern corroborated by recent findings that suggest significant rises in cladogenesis rates during the Early and Late Miocene. These diversification events are often linked to the eastward shift of the global biodiversity hotspot from the Tethys region to its current location in the Indo-West Pacific. This shift was influenced by tectonic activity, including the formation of the Gomphotherium land bridge and the collision of the Australia-New Guinea plate with Pacific arcs and the Southeast Asian plate margin approximately 25 million years ago, creating new shallow-water habitats and extended coastlines. These geological changes facilitated the expansion of seagrass habitats and the diversification of zooxanthellate corals around 20–25 million years ago. The resulting increase in habitat complexity contributed to elevated cladogenesis rates among many benthic groups, including strombids, which are closely associated with seagrass beds and coral rubble. This ecological expansion is believed to have driven a significant diversification within Strombidae approximately 23 million years ago.

== Human use ==
Snails in the family Strombidae are used by humans in a wide range of ways, mostly as food or decoration. Several species belonging to numerous genera among the Strombidae are considered economically important. Some species have been used in human culture for centuries. Since before the Age of Discovery, strombid shells were used as wind instruments, and were later used in the lime industry, in handicrafts, as souvenirs, and even in jewelry. In the Caribbean, Bermuda and southeastern United States, the queen conch Aliger gigas is sought after for its conch pearls, which have been used in jewelry since the Victorian era.

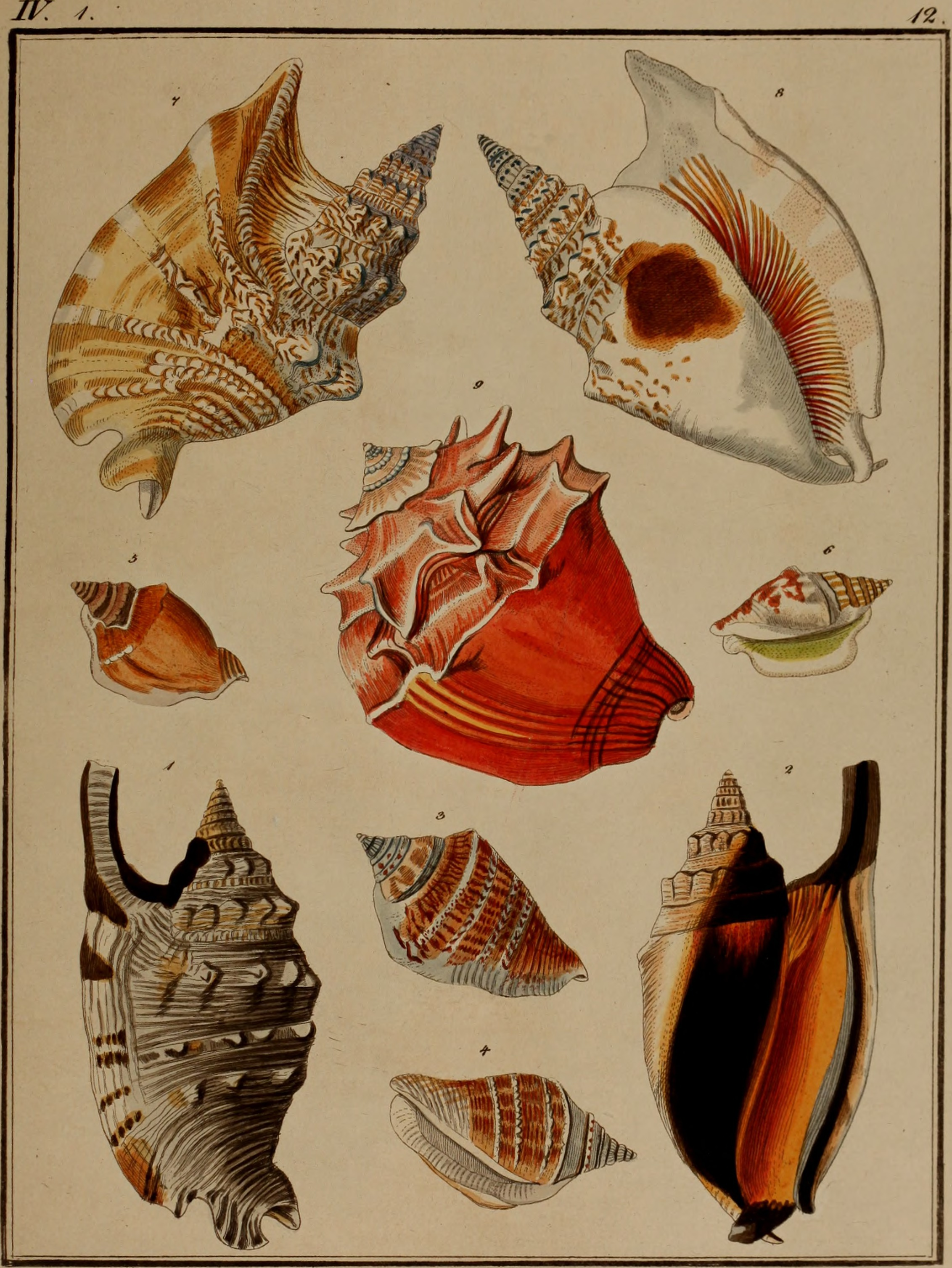

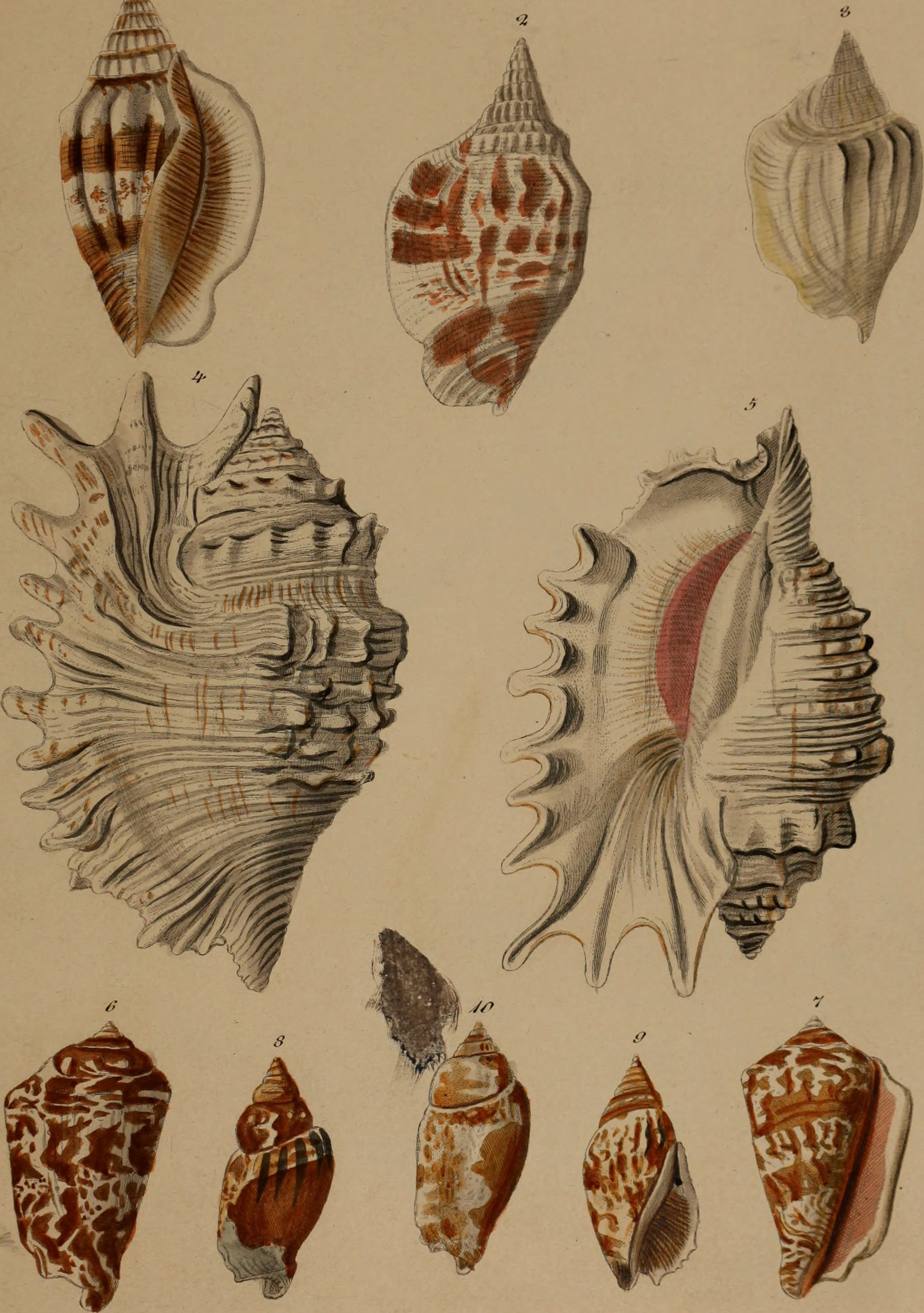

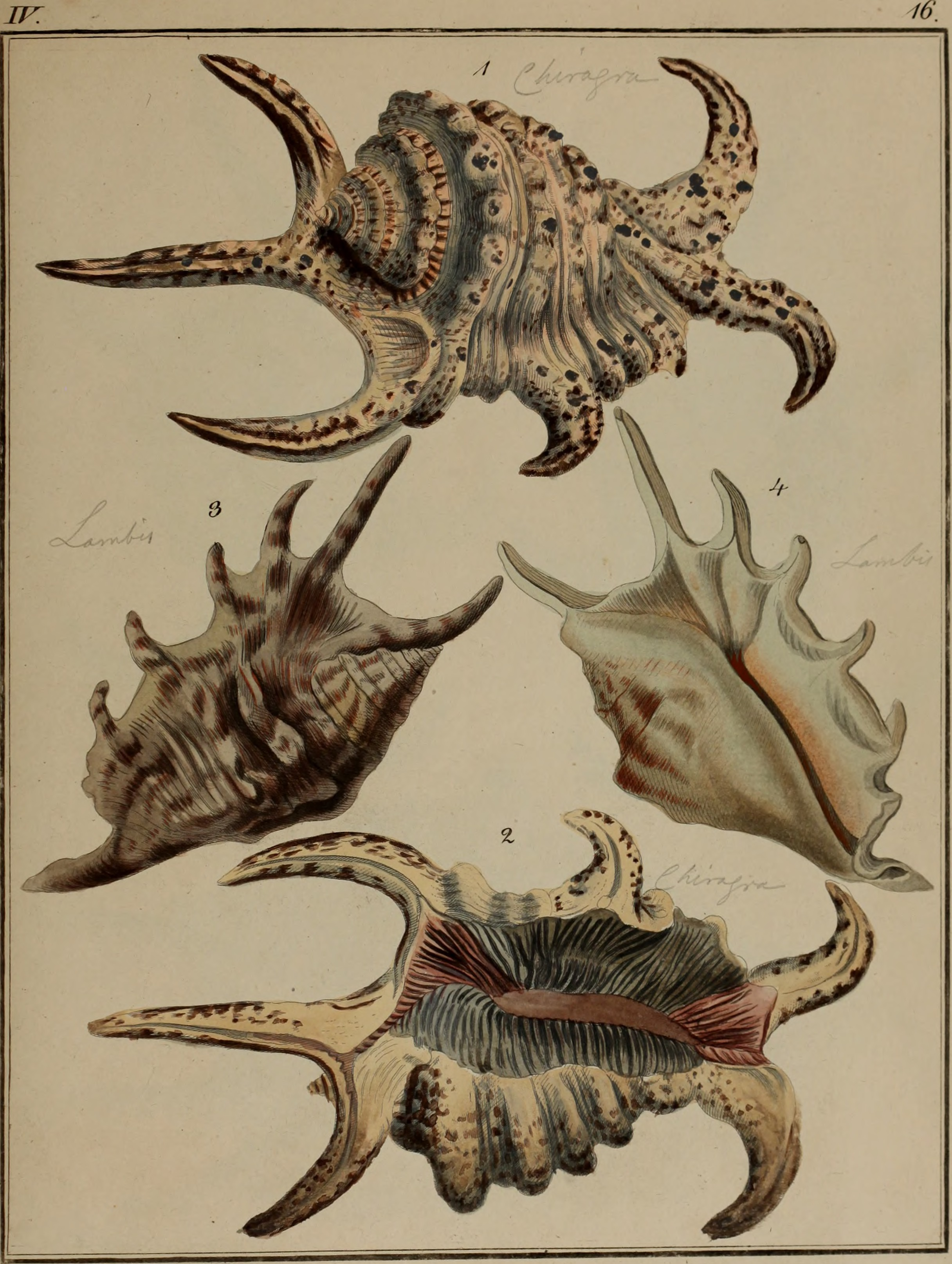

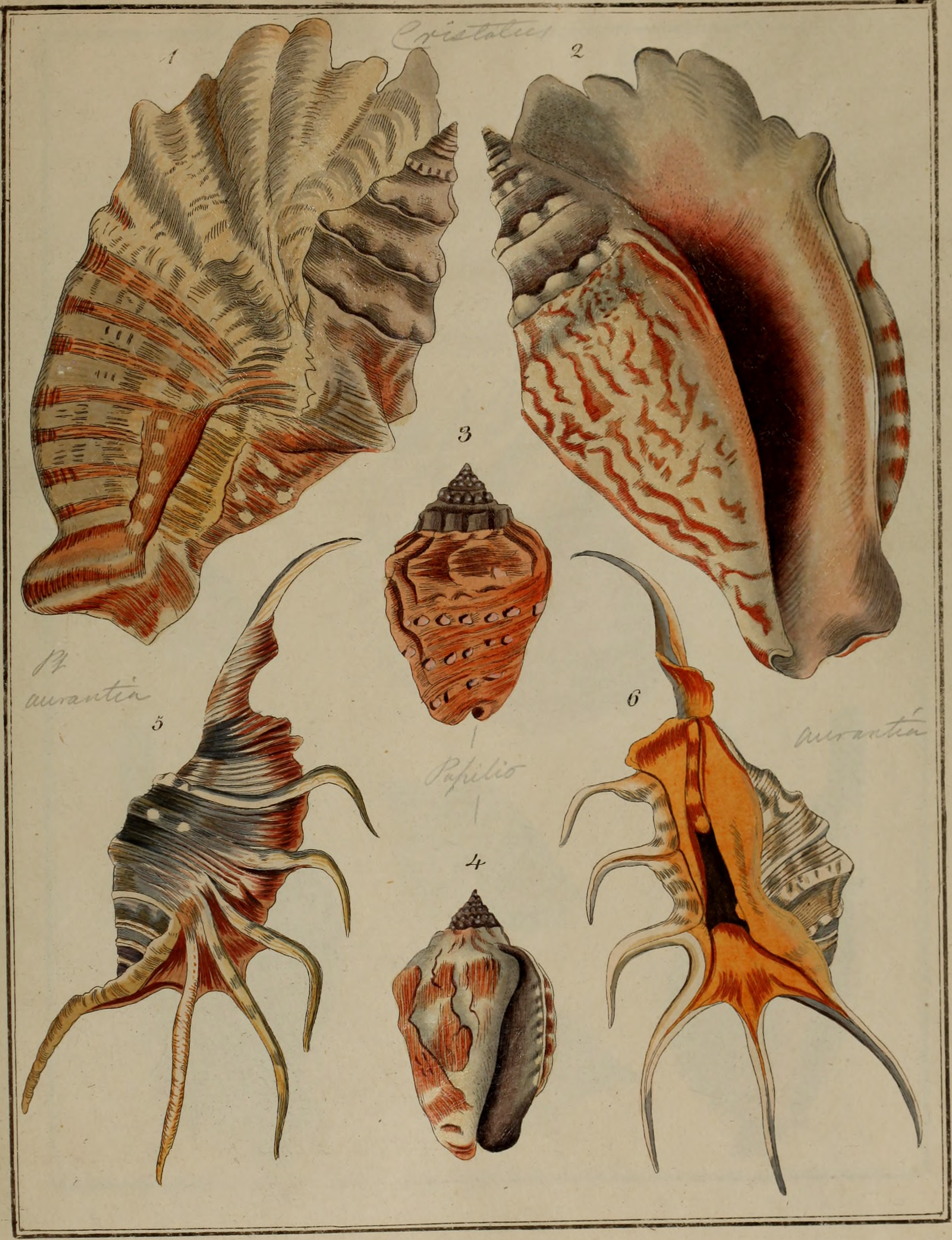

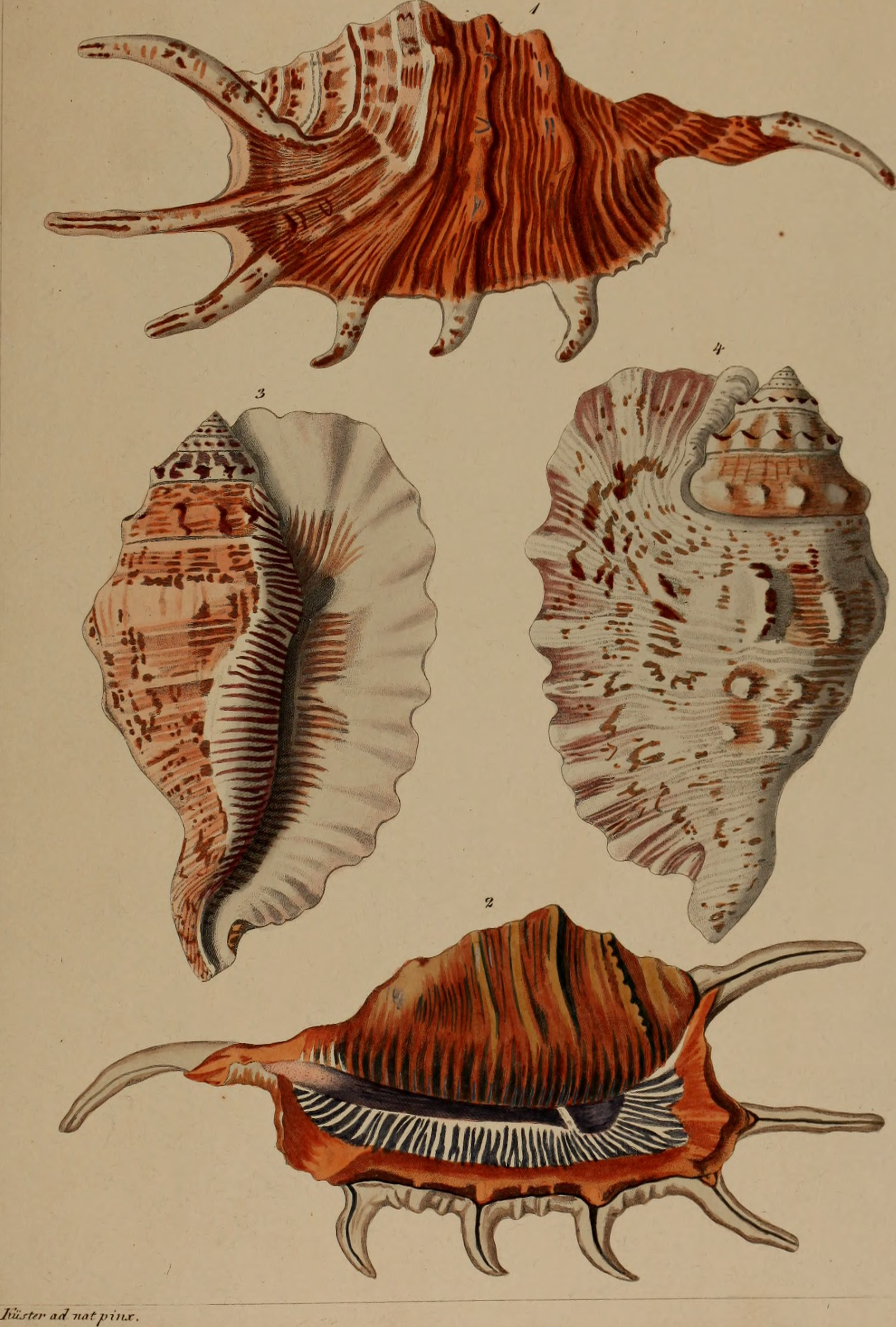

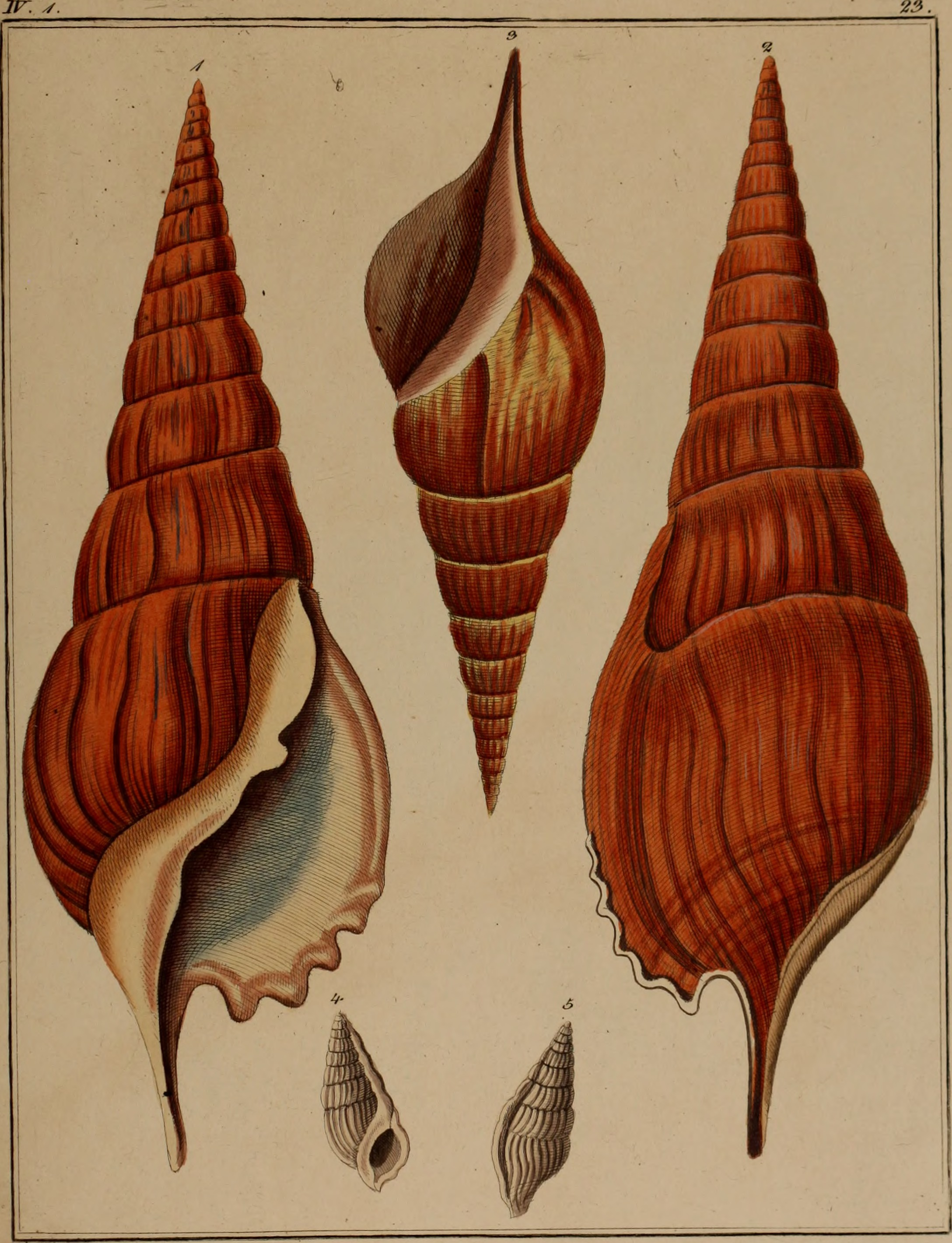

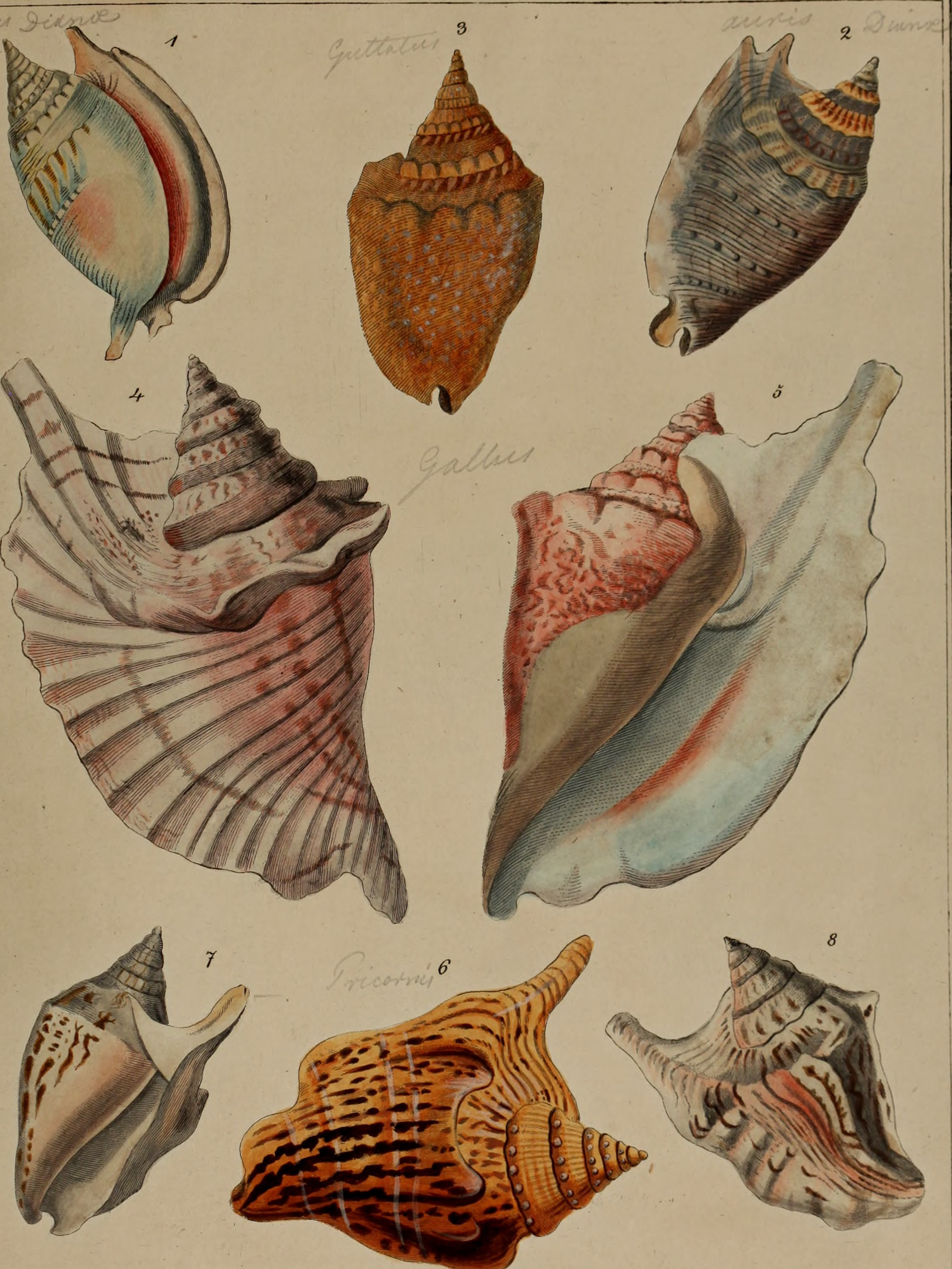
