= Spinatus muscle =

Spinatus muscle may refer to:

- Infraspinatus muscle
- Supraspinatus muscle
