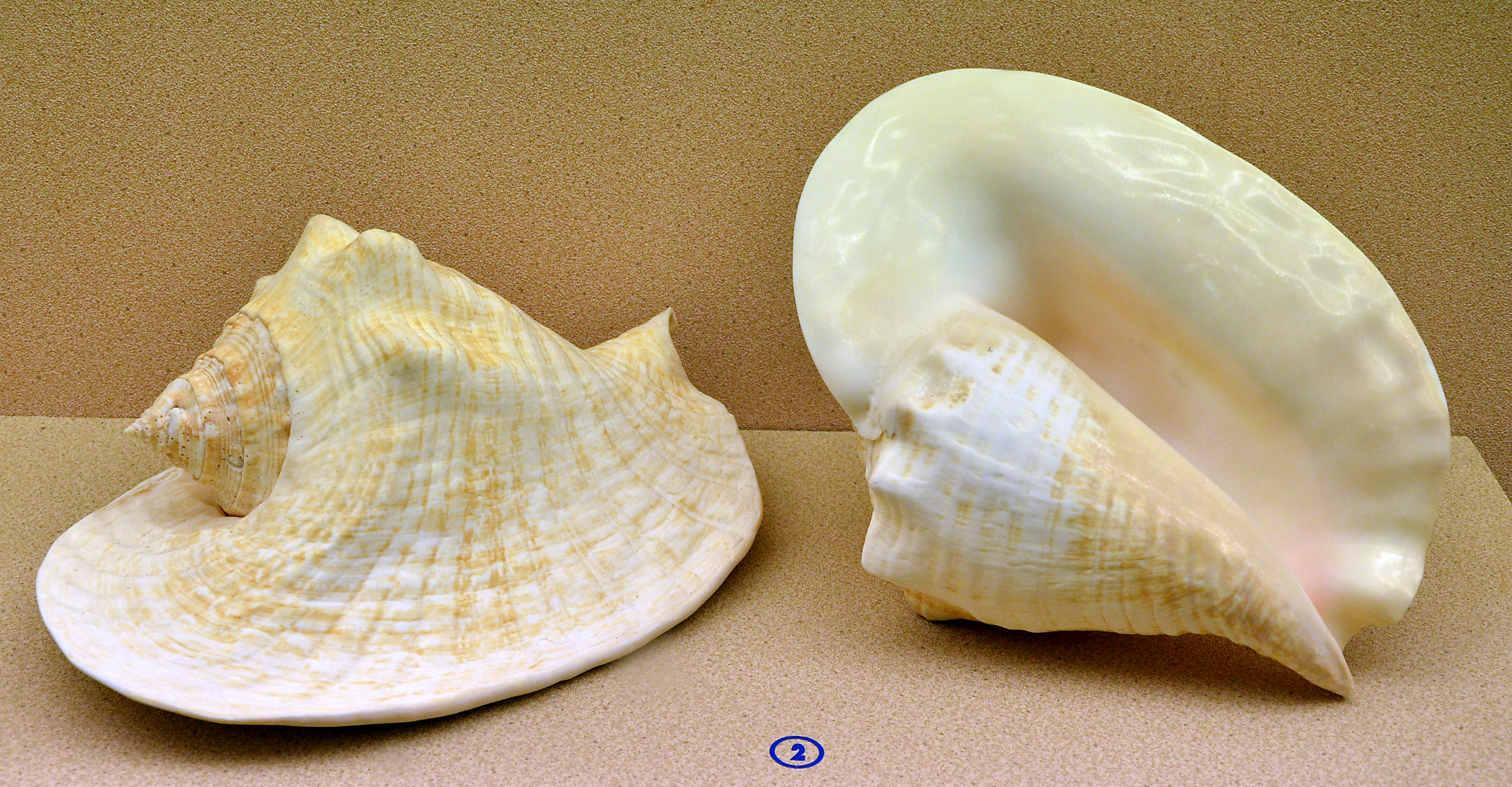
- Two shells of Titanostrombus goliath

Scientific classification
- Kingdom: Animalia
- Phylum: Mollusca
- Class: Gastropoda
- Subclass: Caenogastropoda
- Order: Littorinimorpha
- Family: Strombidae
- Genus: Titanostrombus
- Species: T. goliath

Binomial name
- Titanostrombus goliath (Schröter, 1805)

Synonyms
- Eustrombus goliath (Schröter, 1805); Lobatus goliath (Schröter, 1805); Strombus goliath Schröter, 1805

= Titanostrombus goliath =

Species of gastropod

Titanostrombus goliath, previously known as Lobatus goliath and Strombus goliath, common name the goliath conch, is a species of very large edible sea snail, a marine gastropod mollusk in the family Strombidae, the true conchs. T. goliath is one of the largest mollusks of the Western Atlantic Ocean, and also one of the largest species among the Strombidae. It was once considered endemic to Brazil, but specimens have also been recently found in the waters of Barbados. Brazilian common names for this species include búzio de chapéu or búzio (in Ceará state), and búzio de aba or buzo in (Bahia state). Some phylogenetic hypotheses consider T. goliath as closely related to the queen conch, Aliger gigas.

== Taxonomy ==
This species was first named as Strombus goliath by German theologian Johann Samuel Schröter in 1805. It is named after the biblical figure Goliath, who is traditionally considered to have been of tremendous size.

The family Strombidae has undergone an extensive taxonomic revision recently and many subgenera, including Eustrombus, were elevated to genus level by some authors. Petuch recombined this species as Titanostrombus goliath in 2004, and Landau et al. recombined it as Lobatus goliath in 2008. In 2020, the species was recombined as Titanostrombus goliath by Maxwell and colleagues. The type locality of this species is Paracuru beach, north of Fortaleza, in Ceará state (Brazil).

== Phylogeny ==
- Strombidae
  - Terebellum terebellum
  - - Canarium urceus
    - - Conomurex luhuanus
      - - Tricornis raninus
        - - Lambis lambis
          - - Strombus
            - - Eustrombus
              - Aliger

Phylogeny and relationships of Strombidae according to Simone (2005)

The phylogenetic relationships among the Strombidae have been mainly accessed on two occasions, by Simone (2005) and Latiolais (2006). However, Titanostrombus goliath was only included in Simone's analysis. Simone proposed a cladogram (a tree of descent) based on an extensive morpho-anatomical analysis of representatives of Aporrhaidae, Strombidae, Xenophoridae and Struthiolariidae, which included T. goliath.

With the exception of Lambis and Terebellum, the remaining taxa were previously allocated within the genus Strombus, including T. goliath. However, according to Simone, only Strombus gracilior, Strombus alatus and Strombus pugilis, the type species, remained within Strombus, as they constituted a distinct group based on at least five synapomorphies (traits that are shared by two or more taxa and their most recent common ancestor). The remaining taxa were previously considered as subgenera, and were elevated to genus level by Simone in the end of his analysis. The genus Eustrombus (then considered a synonym of Lobatus), in this case, included Eustrombus gigas (now considered a synonym of Aliger gigas) and Eustrombus goliath (= T. goliath), which were thus considered closely related.

== Distribution ==
Titanostrombus goliath is found along the northeastern and southeastern coast of Brazil, including several Brazilian states, such as Ceará, Rio Grande do Norte, Pernambuco, Alagoas, Bahia and Espírito Santo and insular regions, such as Abrolhos Marine National Park.

Since October 2008, a small population of both juvenile and adult specimens of Titanostrombus goliath was reported by fishermen to have been established in at least two locations along the west coast of Barbados. According to Professor Hazel A. Oxenford of the University of the West Indies, Cave Hill Campus, the means by which T. goliath came to dwell in Barbadian waters are not entirely clear; but the most likely explanation was that Goliath conch larvae were brought over from Brazilian to Barbadian waters by an 'extreme oceanographic event' involving the North Brazilian Current (NBC). Oxenford also assessed that the species was not invasive and unlikely to pose a threat to native marine flora and fauna, but opined that overfishing could cause severe depletion of its numbers.

== Shell description ==
The maximum reported length for an adult shell of Titanostrombus goliath is 380 mm (15 in). The goliath conch has a very large, heavy and solid shell, with a very conspicuous, widely flaring and thickened outer lip. The stromboid notch is rather inconspicuous in adult individuals, but it can be identified as a secondary anterior indentation to the right of the siphonal canal in a non-sinistral shell, assuming it is viewed ventrally, with its anterior end pointing down. Unlike the similarly sized queen conch, Aliger gigas, the aperture of the shell of the Goliath conch is colored tan, and not pink. T. goliath has also a shorter spire and duller spines as compared to the queen conch, and the outer lip frequently expands far beyond the length of the spire in the shells of adult individuals.

== Habitat ==
The minimum recorded depth for this species is 0 m, and the maximum recorded depth is 50 m.

== Human uses ==
The flesh of the goliath conch is edible. However, the shell has recently become the main reason for the fishery. This is because the shell is a popular decorative object which is widely utilized in handicrafts and commonly sold as a souvenir in local markets and craft stores in several regions of Brazil. This is despite the fact that some authors have warned about the risks to this species of overexploitation and even extinction. In response to depletion of Titanostrombus goliath numbers, the species was included in Annex II of the Brazilian List of Species Threatened by Overexploitation since 2005.
