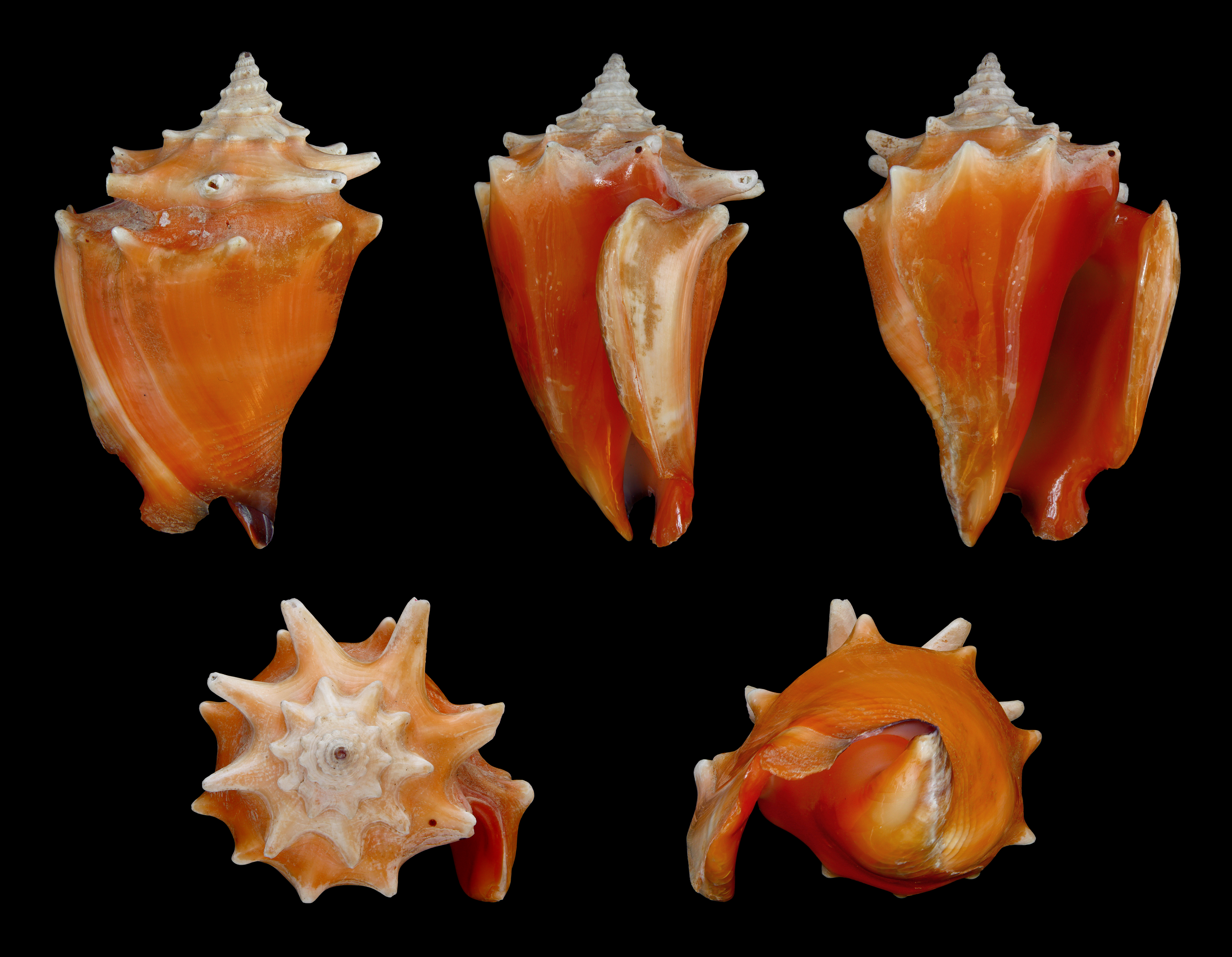
- Five views of a shell of the West Indian fighting conch, Strombus pugilis, type species of the genus Strombus

Scientific classification
- Kingdom: Animalia
- Phylum: Mollusca
- Class: Gastropoda
- Subclass: Caenogastropoda
- Order: Littorinimorpha
- Superfamily: Stromboidea
- Family: Strombidae
- Genus: Strombus; Linnaeus, 1758

Type species
- Strombus pugilis Linnaeus, 1758

Synonyms
- Pyramis Röding, 1798; Strombella Schlüter, 1838

= Strombus =

Strombus Temporal range: Cretaceous - recent

Genus of gastropods

Strombus is a genus of medium to large sea snails, marine gastropod molluscs in the family Strombidae, which comprises the true conchs and their immediate relatives. The genus Strombus was named by Swedish Naturalist Carl Linnaeus in 1758. Around 50 living species were recognized, which vary in size from fairly small to very large. Six species live in the greater Caribbean region, including the queen conch, Strombus gigas (now usually known as Eustrombus gigas or Lobatus gigas or Aliger gigas), and the West Indian fighting conch, Strombus pugilis. However, since 2006, many species have been assigned to discrete genera. These new genera are, however, not yet found in most textbooks and collector's guides.

Worldwide, several of the larger species are economically important as food sources; these include the endangered queen conch, which very rarely also produces a pink, gem-quality pearl.

In the geological past, a much larger number of species of Strombus existed. Fossils of species within this genus have been found all over the world in sediments from Cretaceous to Quaternary (age range: 140.2 million years ago to recent).

Of the living species, most are in the Indian and Pacific Oceans. Many species of true conchs live on sandy bottoms among beds of sea grass in tropical waters. They eat algae and have a claw-shaped operculum.

== Description ==
=== Anatomy ===
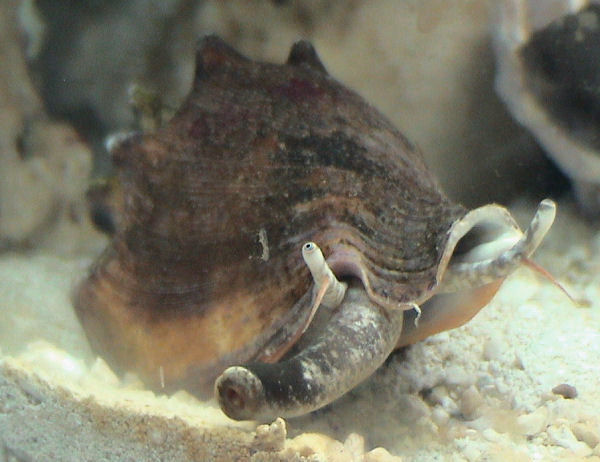
Live animal of the Florida fighting conch Strombus alatus: Note the extensible snout in the foreground, and the two stalked eyes behind it.

Like almost all shelled gastropods, conches have spirally constructed shells. Again, as is normally the case in many gastropods, this spiral shell growth is usually right-handed, but on very rare occasions it can be left-handed.

True conches have long eye stalks, with colorful ring-marked eyes at the tips. The shell has a long and narrow aperture, and a short siphonal canal, with another indentation near the anterior end called a stromboid notch. This notch is where one of the two eye stalks protrudes from the shell.

The true conch has a foot ending in a pointed, sickle-shaped, operculum, which can be dug into the substrate as part of an unusual "leaping" locomotion.

True conches grow a flared lip on their shells only upon reaching sexual maturity. This is called an alated outer lip or alation.

Conches lay eggs in long strands; the eggs are contained in twisted, gelatinous tubes. Strombus moves with a leaping motion.

== Shell description ==
Strombus shells have a flaring outer lip with a notch near the anterior end called the stromboid notch through which the animal can protrude one of its stalked eyes.

== Phylogeny ==
- Strombidae
  - Terebellum terebellum
  - - Canarium urceus
    - - Conomurex luhuanus
      - - Tricornis raninus
        - - Lambis lambis
          - - Strombus
            - - Eustrombus
              - Aliger

A simplified version of the phylogeny and relationships of the Strombidae according to Simone (2005)

- - - - - - - - - - Strombus gallus
                  - Strombus gigas
                - Strombus costatus
              - - Strombus raninus
                - Strombus peruvianus
            - Strombus galeus
          - Strombus latus
        - - - - Strombus pugilis
              - Strombus alatus
            - Strombus gracilior
          - Strombus granulatus

Phylogeny and relationships of Eastern Pacific and Atlantic Strombus species, according to Latiolais et al. (2006)

The phylogenetic relationships among the Strombidae have been mainly accessed in two different occasions, using two distinct methods. In a 2005 monograph, Simone proposed a cladogram (a tree of descent) based on an extensive morphoanatomical analysis of representatives of the Aporrhaidae, Strombidae, Xenophoridae, and Struthiolariidae. However, according to Simone, only Strombus gracilior, Strombus alatus, and Strombus pugilis, the type species, remained within Strombus. In Simone's cladogram, these three species constituted a distinct group based on at least five synapomorphies (traits that are shared by two or more taxa and their most recent common ancestor). The remaining taxa were previously considered as subgenera, and were elevated to genus level by Simone in the end of his analysis.

In a different approach, Latiolais and colleagues (2006) proposed another cladogram that attempts to show the phylogenetic relationships of 34 species within the family Strombidae. The authors analysed 31 species in the genus Strombus and three species in the allied genus Lambis. The cladogram was based on DNA sequences of both nuclear histone H3 and mitochondrial cytochrome-c oxidase I (COI) protein-coding gene regions. In this proposed phylogeny, Strombus pugilis, Strombus alatus, Strombus granulatus and Strombus gracilior are closely related and appear to share a common ancestor.

== Species ==
This genus of sea snails used to comprise about 50 species, 38 of them occurring in the Indo-Pacific region. Species within the genus Strombus include:

- Strombus alatus Gmelin, 1791
- Strombus gracilior Sowerby I, 1825
- Strombus pugilis Linnaeus, 1758
- Strombus fragilis (Röding, 1798)

Extinct species

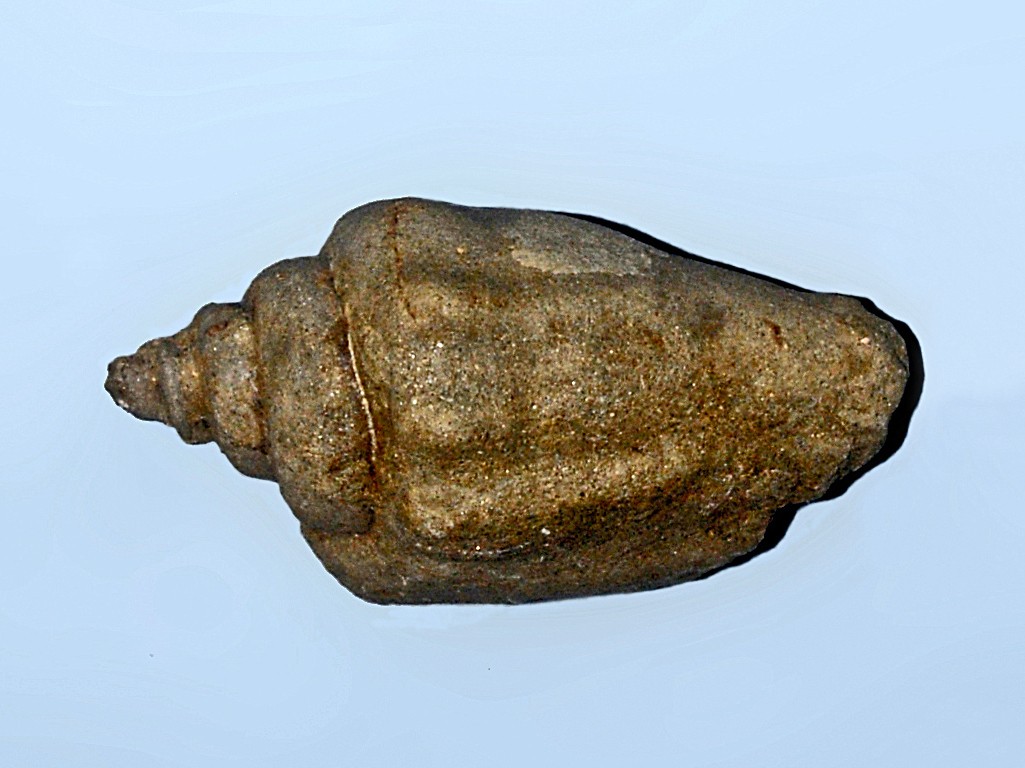
Fossil shell of Strombus radix

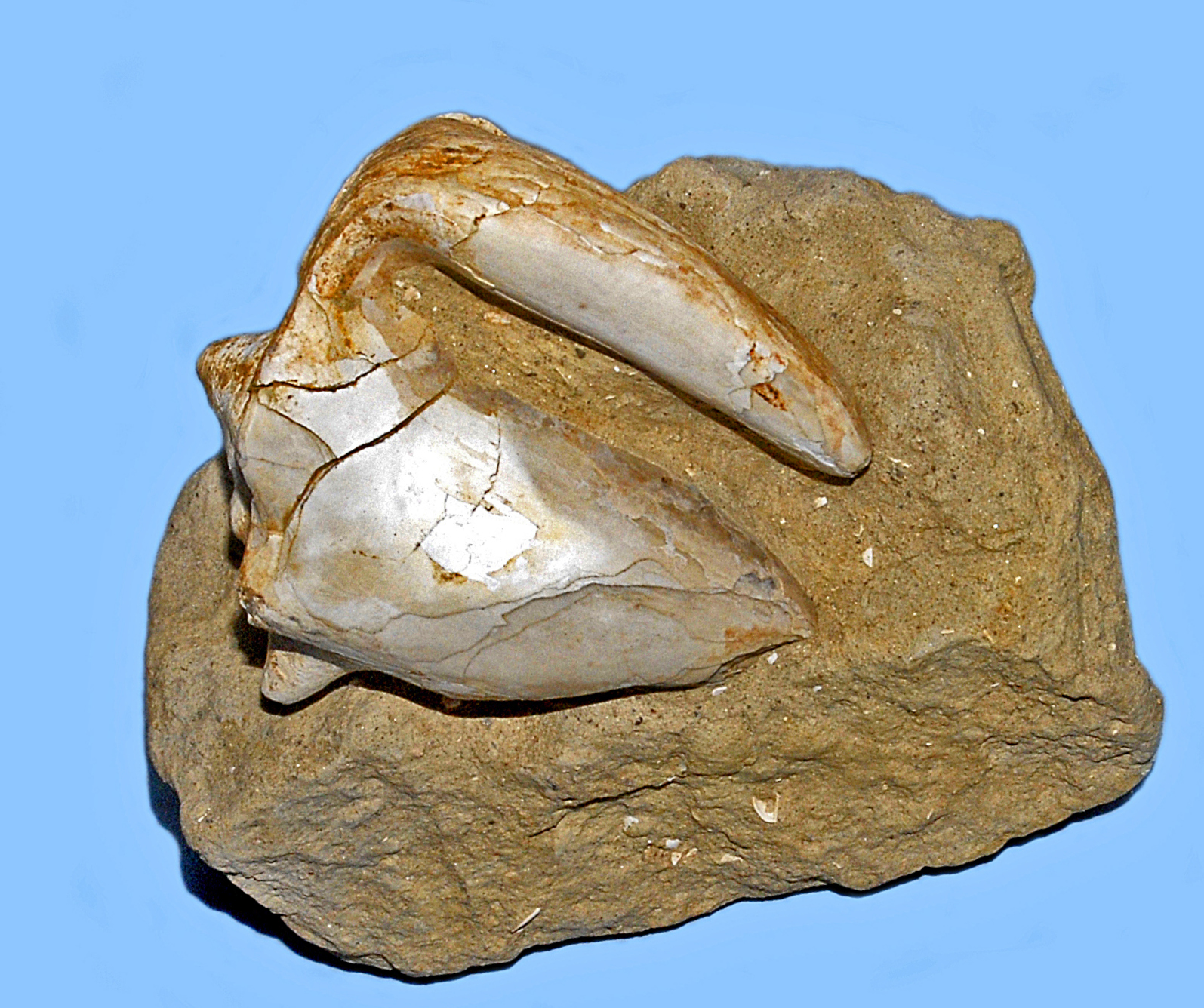
Fossil shell of Strombus coronatus from Pliocene of Italy

Extinct species within this genus include:

- †Strombus arayaensis Landau and Marques da Silva 2010
- †Strombus bifrons Sowerby 1850
- †Strombus contortus Forbes 1846
- †Strombus coronatus Defrance 1827
- †Strombus cossmanni Dey 1961
- †Strombus daviesi Dey 1961
- †Strombus evergladesensis Petuch 1991
- †Strombus floridanus Mansfield 1930
- †Strombus glaber Martin 1879
- †Strombus herklotsi Martin 1879
- †Strombus inflatus Martin 1879
- †Strombus javanus Martin 1879
- †Strombus junghuhni Martin 1879
- †Strombus labiatus Röding 1798
- †Strombus lindae Petuch 1991
- †Strombus mekranicus Vredenburg 1925
- †Strombus proximus Sowerby 1850
- †Strombus sedanensis Martin 1899
- †Strombus triangulatus Martin 1879
- †Strombus uncatus Forbes 1846
- †Strombus urceus Linnaeus 1758
- †Strombus vomer Röding 1798

Species brought into synonymy

- Strombus accipiter Dillwyn, 1817 : synonym of Lobatus costatus (Gmelin, 1791)
- Strombus aurisdianae Linnaeus, 1759: synonym of Euprotomus aurisdianae (Linnaeus, 1758)
- Strombus bituberculatus Lamarck, 1822 : synonym of Lobatus raninus (Gmelin, 1791)
- Strombus boletus Röding, P.F., 1798: synonym of Clionella sinuata (Born, 1778)
- Strombus bulla Röding, 1798: synonym of Euprotomus bulla (Röding, 1798)
- Strombus canarium Linnaeus, 1758: synonym of Laevistrombus canarium (Linnaeus, 1758)
- Strombus costatus aguayoi Jaume & del Valle, 1947 : synonym of Lobatus costatus (Gmelin, 1791)
- Strombus decorus (Röding, 1798): synonym of Conomurex decorus (Röding, 1798)
- Strombus dehelensis: synonym of Conomurex fasciatus (Born, 1778)
- Strombus dentatus Linnaeus, 1758: synonym of Tridentarius dentatus (Linnaeus, 1758)
- Strombus epidromis Linnaeus, 1758: synonym of Labiostrombus epidromis (Linnaeus, 1758)
- Strombus erythrinus is a synonym for Canarium erythrinum Dillwyn, 1817
- Strombus fasciatus Born, 1778: synonym of Persististrombus latus (Gmelin, 1791)
- Strombus fusiformis is a synonym for Canarium fusiforme Sowerby, 1842
- Strombus galeatus Swainson, 1823: synonym of Titanostrombus galeatus (Swainson, 1823)
- Strombus gallus Linnaeus, 1758: synonym of Aliger gallus (Linnaeus, 1758)
- Strombus gibberulus Linnaeus, 1758: synonym of Gibberulus gibberulus (Linnaeus, 1758)
- Strombus gigas is a synonym for Eustrombus gigas L., 1758
- Strombus guidoi Man in t'Veld & De Turck, 1998: synonym of Laevistrombus canarium guidoi (Man in 't Veld & De Turck, 1998)
- Strombus goliath Schröter, 1805 : synonym of Lobatus goliath (Schröter, 1805)
- Strombus haemastoma Sowerby, 1842: synonym of Canarium haemastoma (Sowerby II, 1842)
- Strombus hickeyi Willan, 2000: synonym of Dolomena hickeyi (Willan, 2000)
- Strombus inermis Swainson, 1822 : synonym of Lobatus costatus (Gmelin, 1791)
- Strombus integer Swainson, 1823 : synonym of Lobatus costatus (Gmelin, 1791)
- Strombus jeffersonia Van Hyning, 1945 : synonym of Lobatus costatus (Gmelin, 1791)
- Strombus labiatus is a synonym for Canarium labiatum Röding, 1798
- Strombus labiosus Gray in Wood, 1828: synonym of Dolomena labiosa (Wood, 1828)
- Strombus latus Gmelin, 1791: synonym of Persististrombus latus (Gmelin, 1791)
- Strombus lentiginosus Linnaeus, 1758: synonym of Lentigo lentiginosus (Linnaeus, 1758)
- Strombus listeri Gray, 1852: synonym of Mirabilistrombus listeri (Gray, 1852)
- Strombus luhuanus Linnaeus, 1758: synonym of Conomurex luhuanus (Linnaeus, 1758)
- Strombus magolecciai Macsotay & Villarroel, 2001: synonym of Lobatus magolecciai (Macsotay & Campos, 2001)
- Strombus marginatus C. Linnaeus, 1758 : synonym of Margistrombus marginatus (Linnaeus, 1758)
- Strombus mutabilis Swainson, 1821: synonym of Canarium mutabile (Swainson, 1821)
- Strombus oldi Emerson, 1965: synonym of Tricornis oldi (Emerson, 1965)
- Strombus persicus (Swainson, 1821): synonym of Conomurex persicus (Swainson, 1821)
- Strombus plicatus Röding, 1798: synonym of Dolomena plicata (Röding, 1798)
- Strombus sinuatus Humphrey, 1786: synonym of Sinustrombus sinuatus ([Lightfoot], 1786)
- Strombus terebellatus Sowerby, 1842: synonym of Terestrombus terebellatus (G.B. Sowerby II, 1842)
- Strombus tricornis (Humphrey, 1786): synonym of Tricornis tricornis (Lightfoot, 1786)
- Strombus urceus Linnaeus, 1758: synonym of Canarium urceus (Linnaeus, 1758)
- Strombus ustulatus (Schumacher, 1817): synonym of Canarium urceus urseus (Linnaeus, 1758)
- Strombus variabilis Swainson, 1820: synonym of Dolomena variabilis (Swainson, 1820)
- Strombus wilsoni Abbott, 1967: synonym of Canarium wilsonorum (Abbott, 1967)
- Strombus wilsonorum Abbott, 1967: synonym of Canarium wilsonorum (Abbott, 1967)
- Strombus yerburyi E. A. Smith, 1891: synonym of Dolomena plicata yerburyi (E. A. Smith, 1891)
- Strombus zonatus Wood, 1828: synonym of Cerithium zonatum (W. Wood, 1828)

== See also ==
- Conch
