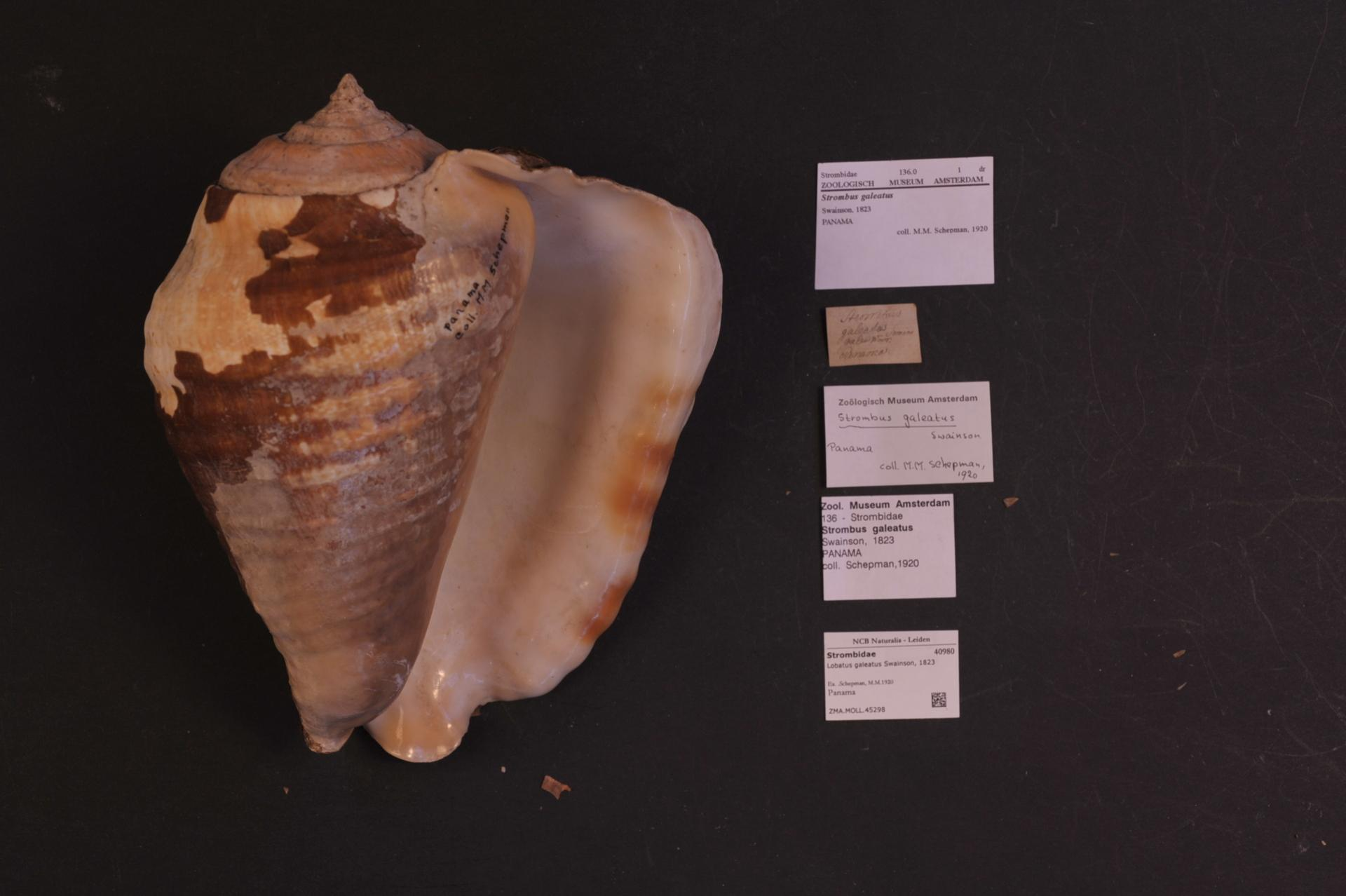
- Apertural view of a shell of Titanostrombus galeatus from a museum collection

Scientific classification
- Kingdom: Animalia
- Phylum: Mollusca
- Class: Gastropoda
- Subclass: Caenogastropoda
- Order: Littorinimorpha
- Family: Strombidae
- Genus: Titanostrombus
- Species: T. galeatus

Binomial name
- Titanostrombus galeatus (Swainson, 1823)

Synonyms
- Strombus galeatus Swainson, 1823 (basionym); Strombus crenatus Sowerby I, 1825; Strombus galea Wood, 1828

= Titanostrombus galeatus =

Species of gastropod

Titanostrombus galeatus, the Eastern Pacific giant conch, is a species of large sea snail, a marine gastropod mollusk in the family Strombidae, the true conchs and their allies.

It is an eastern Pacific species that occurs from the Gulf of California to Peru.

The shells of this species were used as a wind instruments by the Chavín, an ancient civilization from the northern Andean highlands of Peru. They are still used for this purpose in the Andes, where they are known as pututu.

== Distribution ==
Titanostrombus galeatus occurs in several countries and regions along the coastal waters of the eastern Pacific Ocean, including the Gulf of California, Mexico, Pacific Panama, Nicaragua, Costa Rica, Ecuador, Galapagos Islands and Peru.

== Description ==
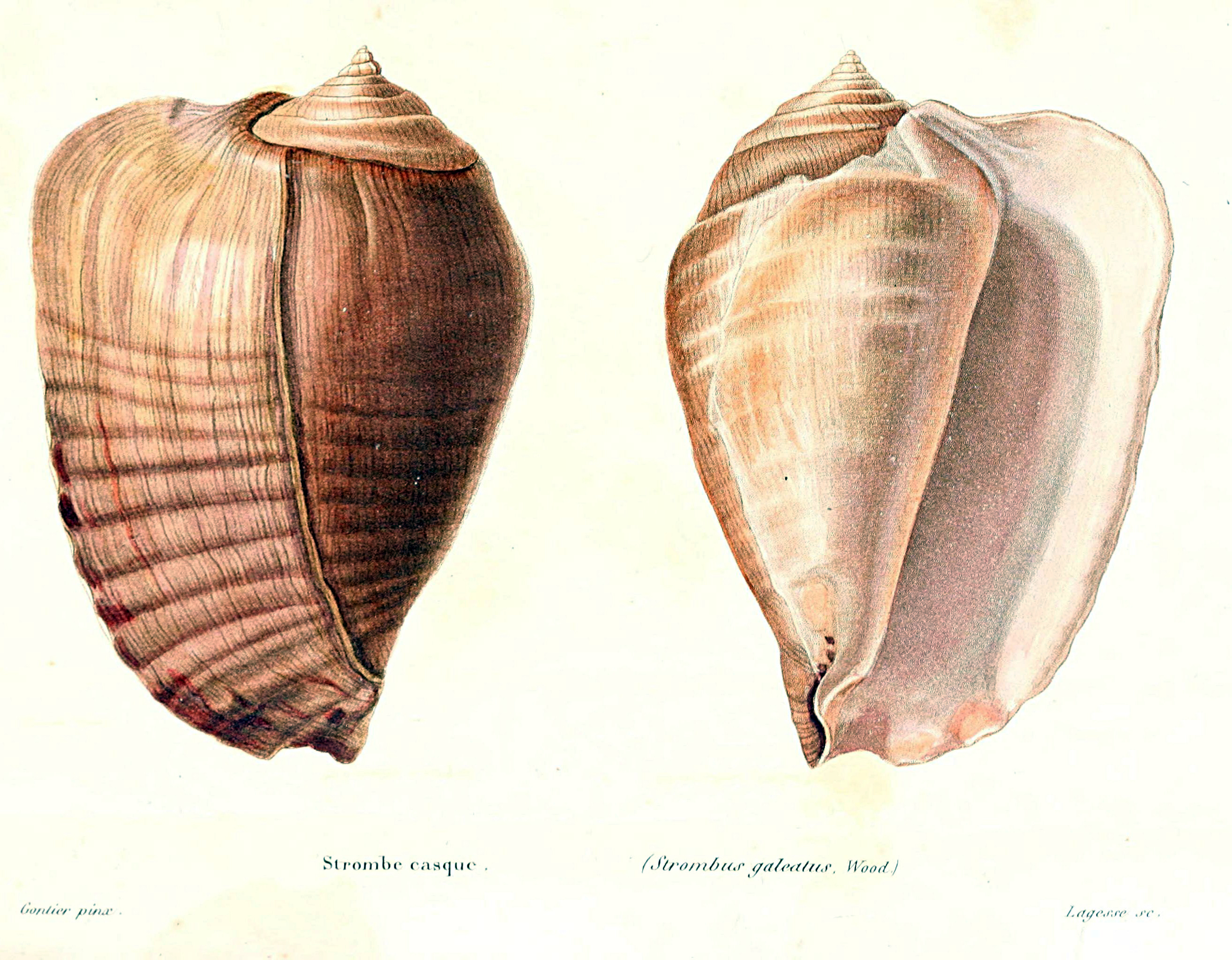
A colored drawing of a shell of Titanostrombus galeatus from Kiener, 1843

The shell of Titanostrombus galeatus is large (maximum size 23 cm (8.97 inches), common to 14 cm (5.46 inches)), very thick and heavy. It has an oblong outline, with a short pointed spire that lacks spines and nodules and is often eroded. The body whorl is very inflated, with numerous spiral ridges and low, slightly noticeable nodules on the shoulder. The periostracum is thick. The outer lip is very flared, posteriorly expanded, not higher than the apex of the spire. The edge of the outer lip edge bears a shallow stromboid notch that is often associated with the undulations originating from the superficial spiral sculpture. The columella is smooth with a well-developed callus in this species. The shell is colored ivory white to light brown externally, with a darker spire and a brown periostracum. The aperture is bright white, and the outer lip and columellar callus are often extensively orange or dull brown in old specimens.

== Phylogeny ==
- - - - - - - - - - Strombus gallus
                  - Strombus gigas
                - Strombus costatus
              - - Strombus raninus
                - Strombus peruvianus
            - Strombus galeatus
          - Strombus latus
        - - - - Strombus pugilis
              - Strombus alatus
            - Strombus gracilior
          - Strombus granulatus

Phylogeny and relationships of Eastern Pacific and Atlantic Strombus species, according to Latiolais et al. (2006)

In 2006, Latiolais and colleagues proposed a cladogram that attempts to show the phylogenetic relationships of 34 species within the family Strombidae. The authors analysed 31 species in the genus Strombus including Lobatus galeatus (there referred to as Strombus galeatus), and three species in the allied genus Lambis. The cladogram was based on DNA sequences of both nuclear histone H3 and mitochondrial cytochrome-c oxidase I protein-coding gene regions. In this proposed phylogeny, Strombus galeatus is show as a sister taxon to the clade that includes Lobatus gallus (Strombus gallus), Lobatus gigas (Strombus gigas), Lobatus costatus (Strombus costatus), Lobatus raninus (Strombus raninus), Lobatus peruvianus (Strombus peruvianus) and their last common ancestor.

== Ecology ==
Titanostrombus galeatus dwells on rocky, sandy bottoms near mangrove areas. It lives in depths from the low tide mark to 15 m, but records go as deep as 30 m. During the beginning of the year, in the early months, L. galeatus exhibits a gregarious behavior, forming large agglomerates in shallow waters. This is due to the mating season, which is also when oviposition occurs. Females usually lay eggs arranged in clusters called egg masses, either directly on the sand or on dead mollusk shells.

During the 19th century, strombid gastropods were believed to be carnivores. This erroneous conception was based on the writings of the French naturalist Jean Baptiste Lamarck, whose classification scheme grouped strombids with the carnivorous sea snails. However, subsequent studies have refuted the concept completely, proving without a doubt that strombid gastropods are herbivorous animals. L. galeatus feeds primarily on macroalgae, and occasionally on detritus.

The giant conch is preyed upon by invertebrates, such as octopuses, and also by vertebrates, including rays (genera and species of cartilaginous fish in the family Myliobatidae), triggerfish (family Balistidae), and snappers (perciform fish in the family Lutjanidae).

== Behavior ==
Compared to other gastropods, Titanostrombus galeatus has an unusual means of locomotion, which is common only among the Strombidae. This curious series of maneuvers was originally described by the American zoologist George Howard Parker in 1922. The animal initially fixes the posterior end of the foot by thrusting the point of its sickle-shaped operculum into the substrate. Then it extends its foot forward, lifting the shell and throwing it ahead in a motion that Parker called "leaping". L. galeatus is known to move long distances, on a scale of kilometers, in a matter of months. Burrowing behavior, in which an individual sinks itself entirely or partially into the substrate, is frequent among strombid gastropods. In the course of its life span, Lobatus galeatus spends part of the time partially buried in the sand.

== Human uses ==
Giant conch shells were used as wind instruments by the Chavín, a pre-Incan civilization that developed in the northern Andean highlands of Peru. Lobatus galeatus shells were prepared for musical use through the creation of a mouthpiece. This was done by cutting a small tip of the spire out and polishing the resulting hole, thus producing a trumpet-like instrument. In 2001, twenty such instruments were excavated from the Chavín de Huantar archaeological site, which makes them nearly three thousand years old. This kind of playable shell is still used in the Andes, where they are known as pututu. Lobatus galeatus is edible; it is an economically important species in many areas where it occurs. It is primarily used for subsistence and commercial fishery.
