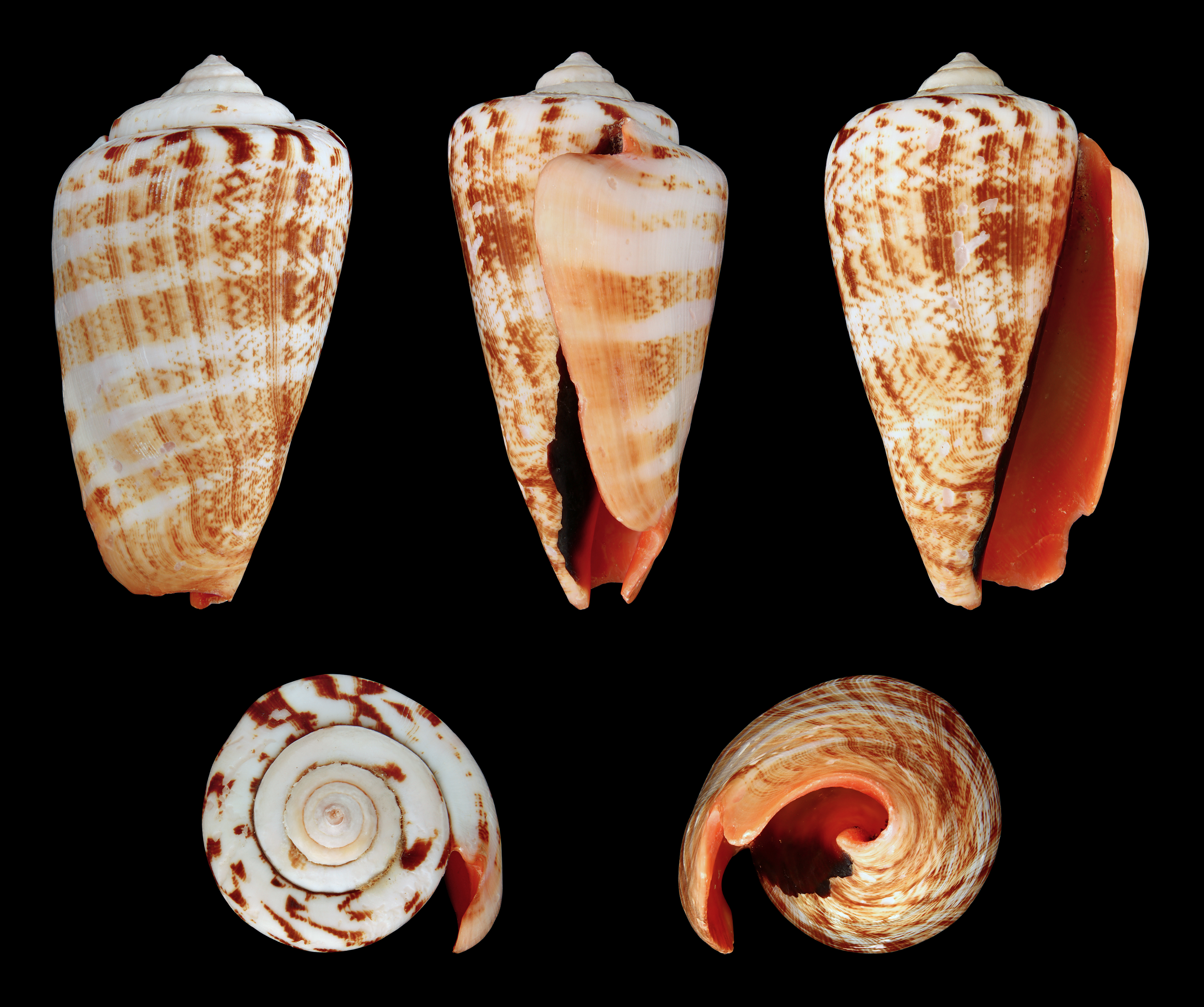
- Five views of a shell of the Strawberry conch, Conomurex luhuanus

Scientific classification
- Kingdom: Animalia
- Phylum: Mollusca
- Class: Gastropoda
- Subclass: Caenogastropoda
- Order: Littorinimorpha
- Superfamily: Stromboidea
- Family: Strombidae
- Genus: Conomurex
- Species: C. luhuanus

Binomial name
- Conomurex luhuanus (Linnaeus, 1758)

Synonyms
- Strombus luhuanus Linnaeus, 1758

= Conomurex luhuanus =

Strawberry conch

Species of gastropod

Conomurex luhuanus, commonly known as the strawberry conch or tiger conch, is a species of medium-sized sea snail, a marine gastropod mollusk in the family Strombidae, the true conchs. C. luhuanus is found in sandy habitat among corals in the Indopacific region. They feed on algae or detritus, move with a modified foot, and have complex eyes compared to other gastropods.

== Shell description ==
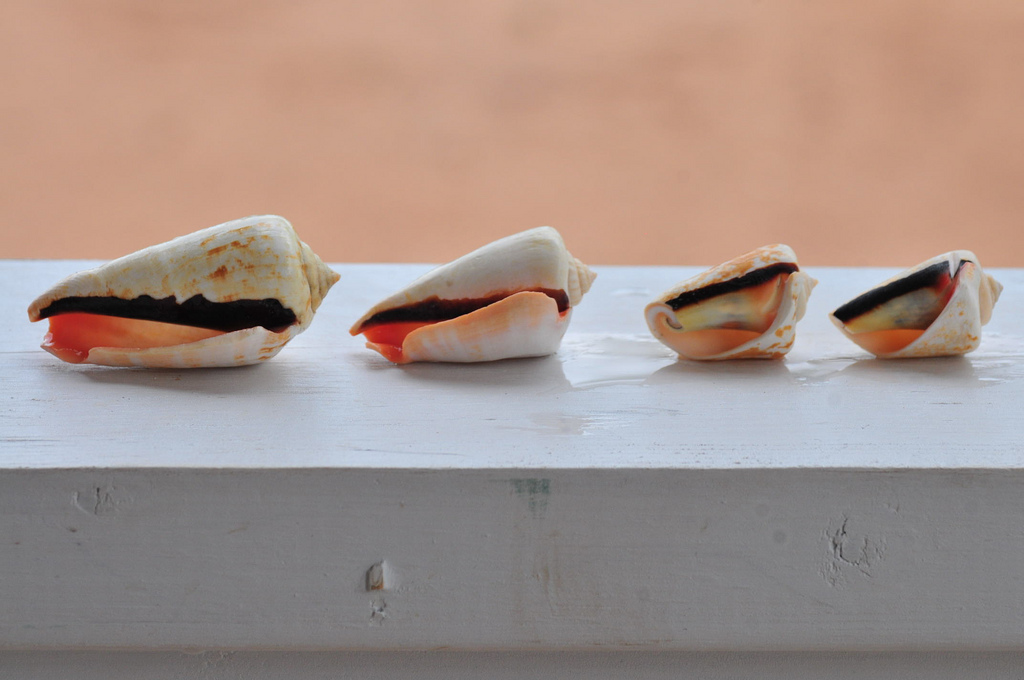
Some shells of Conomurex luhuanus. The two smaller shells to the right have been cut open to reveal the coloration of the parietal wall

The shell of C. luhuanus ranges from a more common length of 5 cm, to a maximum length of 8 cm.

C. luhuanus is often mistaken for a cone snail, mainly because of the conoidal outline of its shell, which is relatively unusual among the Strombidae. Its stromboid notch, though not as conspicuous as observed in many species that used to belong to Strombus (such as Lentigo lentiginosus), is deep and easily distinguished. The interior may be slightly lirate.

The external color of the shell can be either white with an orange, brown/tan pattern of blotches, or completely brown/white. The interior is usually colored strong orange, red or pink, and the inner lip border is black or chocolate brown.

== Phylogeny ==
- Strombidae
  - Terebellum terebellum
  - - Canarium urceus
    - - Conomurex luhuanus
      - - Tricornis raninus
        - - Lambis lambis
          - - Strombus
            - - Eustrombus
              - Aliger

Phylogeny and relationships of Strombidae according to Simone (2005)

The phylogenetic relationships among the Strombidae have been mainly accessed on two occasions, by Simone (2005) and Latiolais (2006), using two distinct methods. Simone proposed a cladogram (a tree of descent) based on an extensive morpho-anatomical analysis of representatives of Aporrhaidae, Strombidae, Xenophoridae and Struthiolariidae, which included C. luhuanus.

With the exception of Lambis and Terebellum, the remaining taxa were previously allocated within the genus Strombus, including C. luhuanus. However, according to Simone, only Strombus gracilior, Strombus alatus and Strombus pugilis, the type species, remained within Strombus, as they constituted a distinct group based on at least five synapomorphies (traits that are shared by two or more taxa and their most recent common ancestor). The remaining taxa were previously considered as subgenera, and were elevated to genus level by Simone in the end of his analysis. The genus Conomurex, in this case, only included C. luhuanus.

In a different approach, Latiolais et al. (2006) proposed a cladogram based on sequences of nuclear histone H3 gene and mitochondrial cytochrome-c oxidase I (COI) gene showing phylogenetic relationships of 32 species that used to belong to the genus Strombus and Lambis, including Conomurex luhuanus (= Strombus luhuanus). All species in this cladogram are still given under their original names in Strombus and Lambis.

== Habitat and ecology ==
 C. luhuanus dwells in sandy substrate in tropical habitats, such as the Great Barrier Reef and southern Papua New Guinea. They often form colonies that move together over long periods of time. Two types of colonies have been described: colonies of juveniles that are made up of conch of the same size-class, and colonies of mixed age-classes that contain individual conch of a spectrum of ages, although within the colony separation based on age still persists. C. luhuanus are herbivores or feed on detritus. They use their proboscis to pick up sand which they may then swallow or eat algae from. Strombus also have sensory tentacles at the end of their eyestalks which may play a role in chemically sensing the presence of nearby food. The sensory tentacles may also be important in detecting predators, such as carnivorous snails. Unlike many snails that move by slowly creeping along their terrain, members of the Strombus family move with an awkward leaping motion as they thrust off the sea floor with their modified foot. This leaping motion is also used to quickly escape from predators.

- - - - Eastern Pacific and Atlantic
        - - - - - - Strombus gallus
                  - Strombus gigas
                - Strombus costatus
              - - Strombus raninus
                - Strombus peruvianus
            - Strombus galeus
          - Strombus latus
        - - - - Strombus pugilis
              - Strombus alatus
            - Strombus gracilior
          - Strobus granulatus
      - - - Strombus bulla
          - Strombus aurisdianae
        - Strombus vomer
    - - Strombus gibberulus
      - Strombus luhuanus
  - - Lambis
      - - Lambis chiragra
        - Lambis truncata
      - Lambis lambis
    - - Strombus taurus
      - Strombus sinuatus
- - - - - - - Strombus maculatus
            - Strombus mutabilis
          - - Strombus microurceus
            - Strombus labiatus
        - - - Strombus fragilis
            - Strombus urceus
          - Strombus dentatus
      - - - Strombus canarium
          - Strombus vittatus
        - Strombus epidromis
    - - Strombus fusiformis
      - Strombus haemostoma
  - Strombus wilsoni

Phylogeny and relationships of Strombidae according to Latiolais (2006)

== Reproduction ==
 C. luhuanus form mating aggregations of copulating individuals where males and females compete for reproduction opportunities.

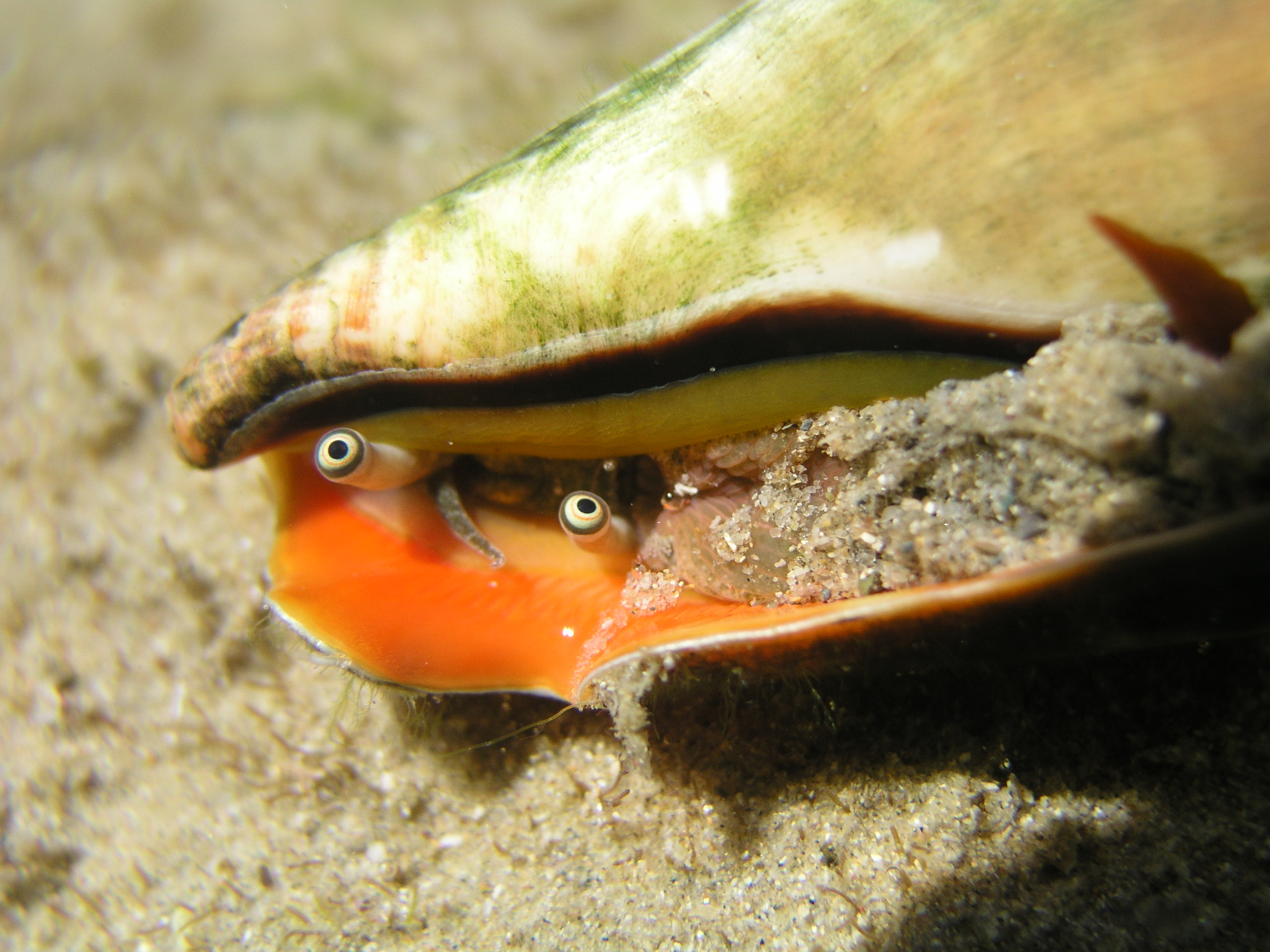
Eyes of C. luhuanus. By Harry Rose.

== Vision ==
The eyes of members of the Strombus family are positioned at the ends of eye stalks and typically have a diameter of about 1.5-2.5 mm, which is large compared to their body size. The eye stalks extend from two notches in the shell. The eye of Strombus contains a spherical lens, a cornea, a pupil with a pigmented iris surrounding it, a vitreous body, and a cup-shaped retina. In contrast, some other gastropods only possess small open eyes containing a gelatinous substance. The retina is made up of several layers. The first layer, located adjacent to the vitreous body, is primarily composed of the processes of photoreceptor cells. This layer is approximately 180 um thick. The next layer is characterized by an abundance of dark pigment granules. The following layer contains the cell bodies of different cell types, and the last layer consists of neuropil. It is from the neuropil layer that the optic nerve projects in several small branches that eventually merge to form a single nerve fiber. Strombus has almost 100,000 photoreceptors, whereas some nudibranchs merely have five. Three distinct cell types have been described in the retinas of C. luhuanus, one of which is a photoreceptor, another which is a glial cell, and the last which may be a second type of photoreceptor. Only one type of visual pigment has been identified in C. luhuanus, suggesting that they do not possess color vision.

Electrophysiological recordings that measure electrical impulses, or action potentials, from neurons have been used to study the neural processing of visual information from the eye of C. luhuanus. When eyes adapted to the dark were shown brief flashes of light, a cornea-negative potential was evoked. This response was termed the "on" response. When light was presented to the dark-adapted eye for a longer period of time, the extracellular retinal potential (ERG) recordings showed the cornea-negative potential declined until a steady-state was reached. Then, the steady-state was maintained until the light stimulus ceased and the potential returned to baseline. Finally, a third type of response that fired at the cessation of light stimulus was observed and termed the "off" response. These different waveform responses could indicate that C. luhuanus is capable of complex neural processing involving excitation, inhibition, and synaptic inhibition. The "on" response could be due to excitation of the optic nerve in response to depolarizing photoreceptors, while the decline to steady-state potential could be a sign of synaptic inhibition, and the "off" activity could indicate release from light-promoted inhibition.

The light-promoted "off" potentials were found to be sensitive to anesthesia by magnesium chloride, with repetitive "off" potentials eliminated within minutes of being introduced to the magnesium chloride solution. However, the light-promoted "on" potentials were not affected by the magnesium chloride and would continue firing over an hour after being immersed in the magnesium chloride solution. These results could indicate that nerve fibers that are responsible for "off" stimuli are regulated by chemical synapses, which can be inhibited by magnesium.

It is not entirely clear why C. luhuanus evolved such well-developed eyes. Usually eyes of this complexity are found on predators that move quickly through their environment looking for prey, not in slow-moving herbivorous creatures such as C. luhuanus. One study suggests that the eyes are important for coordination in the escape response of Strombus. When conch were blinded, they showed an increased probability of leaping nearer to the predator instead of away from it. More work remains to be done on the purpose of the eyes, however.

== Regeneration ==
Another remarkable feature of the eyes of Strombus luhuanus is that they are capable of regeneration following amputation. The first step of regeneration following severance of the optic nerve is the formation of an eye cup as the epithelium adjacent to the cut folds inward. This occurs within a day after the optic nerve is cut. The eye cup is closed by day three, and at this stage it resembles an embryonic eye. The diameter of the eye continues to increase, and meanwhile the cells of the eye differentiate to form the different layers in the retina. When the diameter of the eye reaches about 0.8 mm (after about 15 days), the retina looks like a mature adult eye. The eye will continue to grow until it becomes fully sized, with a diameter of 2 mm, which can take several months. Size, age, sex, nutritional state, or whether the left or right eye is amputated does not have a substantial influence on the regenerative prospects of the eye.

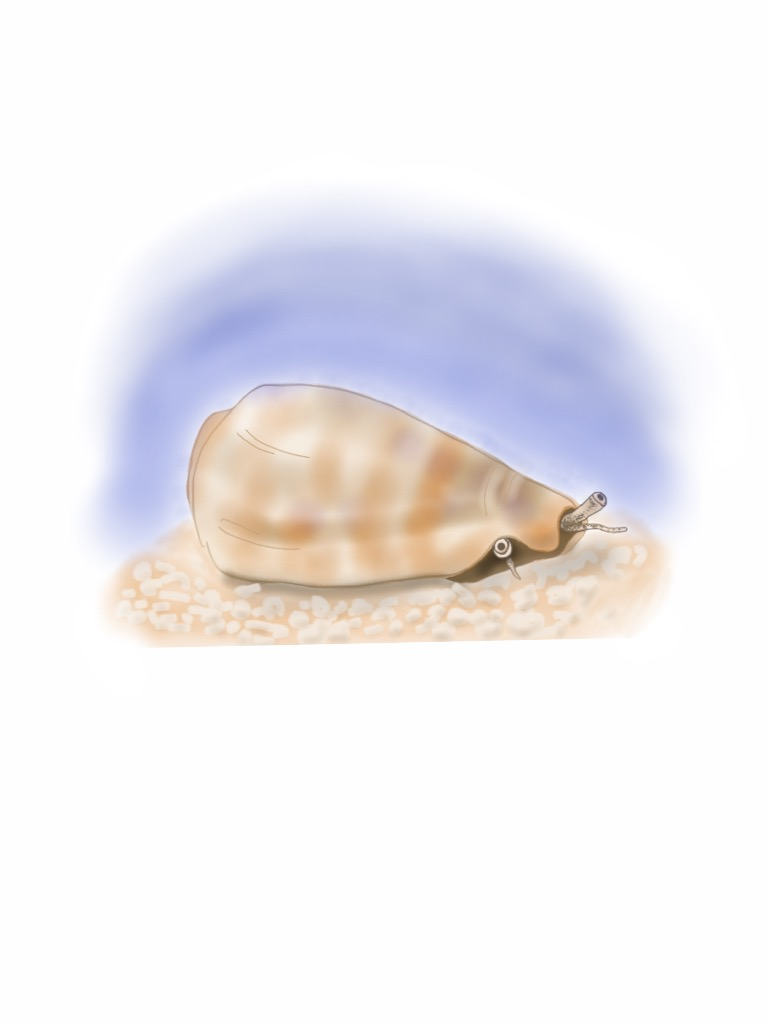
Tiger conch (C. luhuanus)

In gastropod eye regeneration, the degenerating nerve is important for the formation of the new eye. New axons leave the eye cup and bundle together to form the optic nerve. The new nerve fibers seem to be attracted to the previous optic nerve, and grow down it until they make contact with the cerebral ganglion.

Electroretinograms (ERGs) have been used to monitor neuron activity in the developing eye of C. luhuanus over the course of the eye's development. The ERGs of the regenerating C. luhuanus eye grow increasingly complex as the eye matures. During the first week of regeneration, a simple "on" peak was recorded, and steady-state potentials were observed in response to prolonged illumination. When the eye reached about 0.4 mm in diameter, an "off" response was observed occasionally. At a diameter of 0.6 mm, rhythmic ERG "off" responses were detected. By 0.8 mm in diameter, the ERGs of the regenerated eye resembled that of a mature adult eye, with two distinct cornea-negative "on" potentials and rhythmic "off" potentials.
