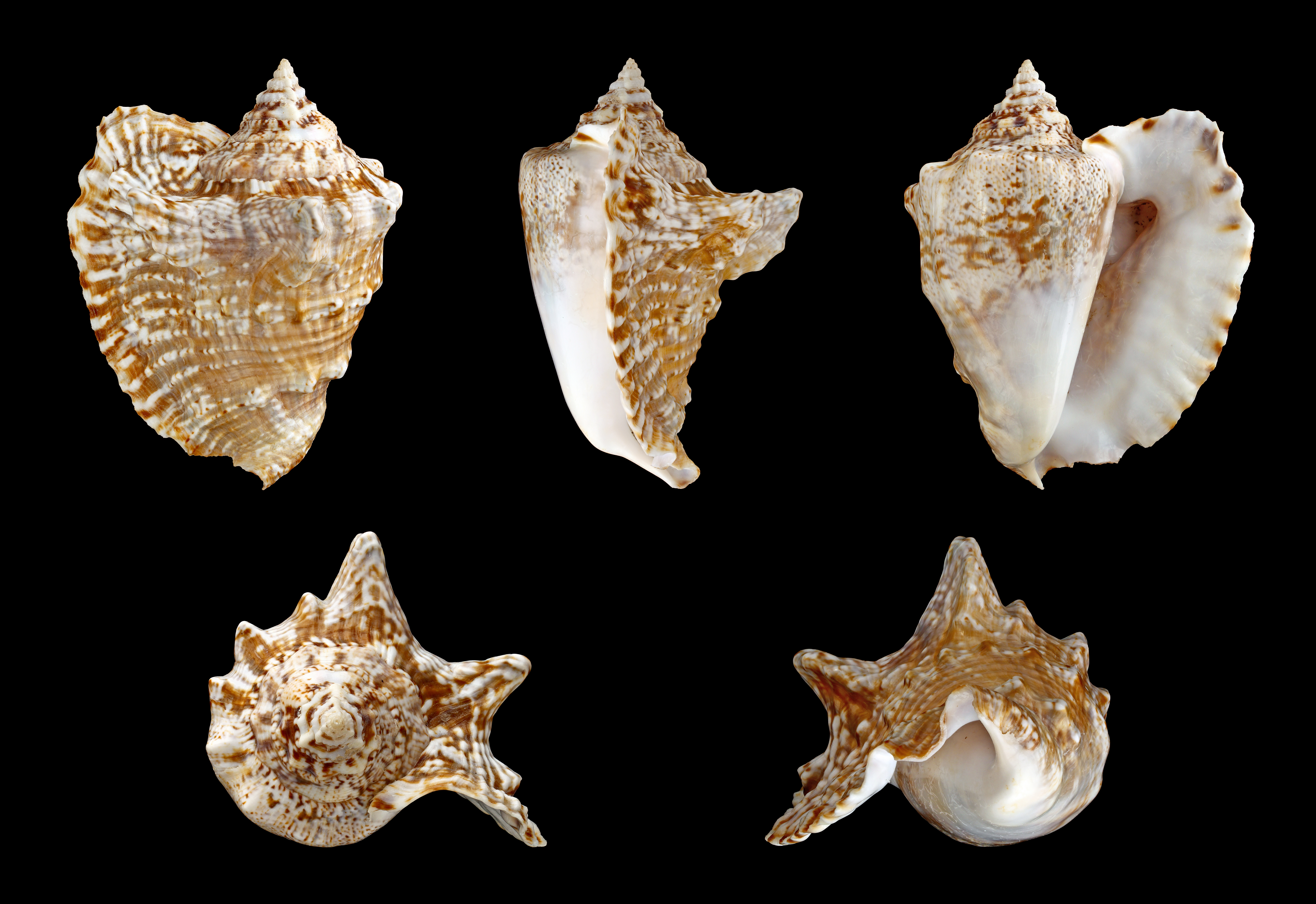
- Five views of a shell of Lobatus raninus (Gmelin, 1791)

Scientific classification
- Kingdom: Animalia
- Phylum: Mollusca
- Class: Gastropoda
- Subclass: Caenogastropoda
- Order: Littorinimorpha
- Family: Strombidae
- Genus: Lobatus
- Species: L. raninus

Binomial name
- Lobatus raninus (Gmelin, 1791)

Synonyms
- List of synonyms: Strombus bituberculatus Lamarck, 1822; Strombus costosomuricatus Mörch, 1852; Strombus fetus Jung & Heitz, 2001; Strombus lobatus Swainson, 1823; Strombus praeraninus Kronenberg & Dekker, 2000 (Unnecessary new name for S. wilsonorum Petuch, 1994); Strombus quadratus Perry, 1811; Strombus raninus Gmelin, 1791 (basionym); Strombus raninus nanus Bales, 1942; Strombus sulcatus Fischer von Waldheim, 1807; Strombus wilsonorum Petuch, 1994 †; Tricornis raninus (Gmelin, 1791)

= Lobatus raninus =

Hawk-wing conch

Species of gastropod

Lobatus raninus, common name the hawk-wing conch, is a species of medium to large sea snail, a marine gastropod mollusk in the family Strombidae, the true conchs.

== Shell description ==
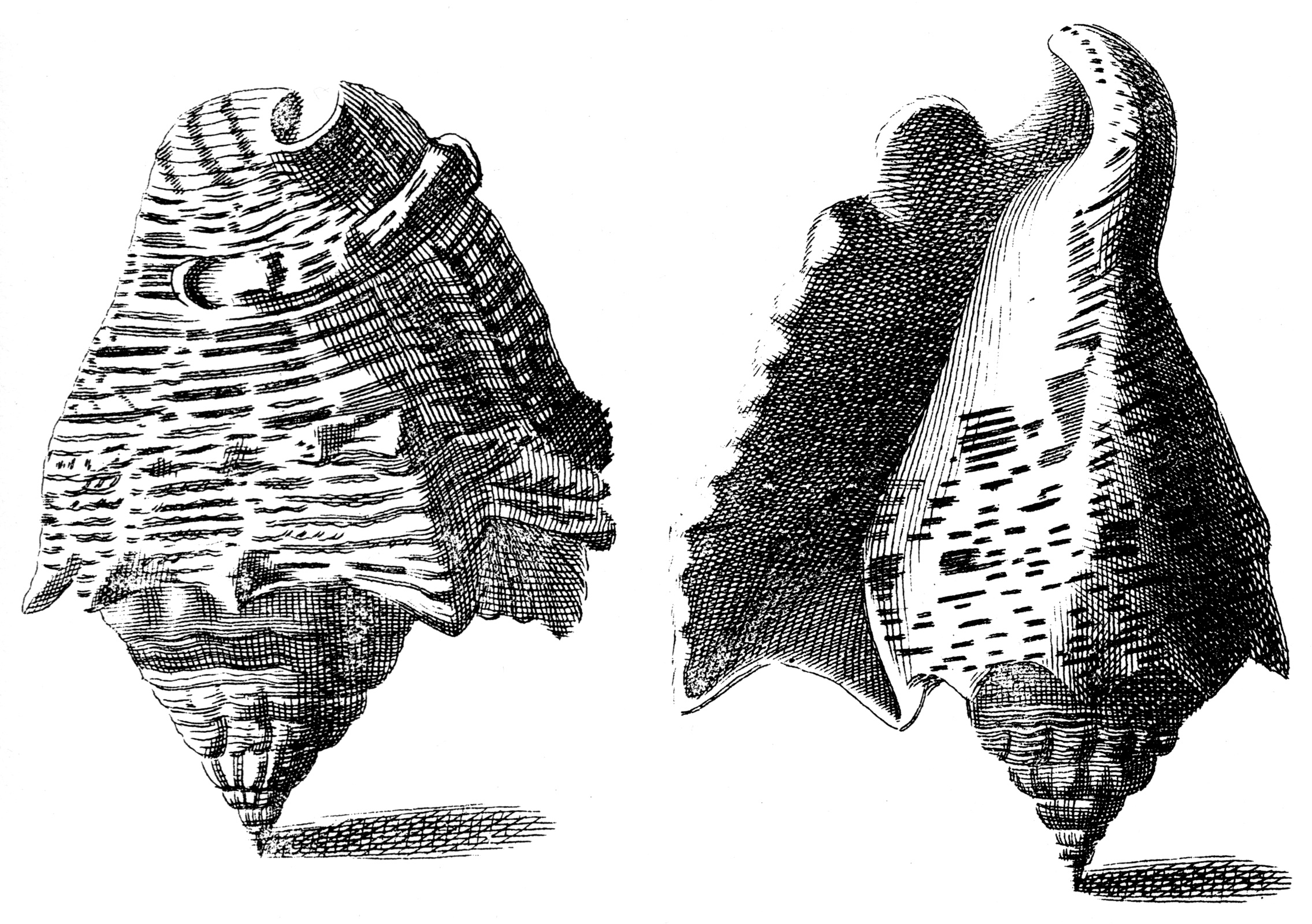
A drawing depicting the shell of Lobatus raninus from Index Testarum Conchyliorum (1742).

The maximum recorded shell length is 121 mm or up to 130 mm. Like other species in the same genus, Lobatus raninus has a robust, somewhat heavy and solid shell, with a distinct stromboid notch. The body whorl is dorsally ornamented by characteristic coarse spiral ridges. The posterior expansion of the flaring outer lip is always lower than the spire. The color is brownish, with several disperse white spots. Both inner and outer lips are cream or white.

== Phylogeny ==
- Strombidae
  - Terebellum terebellum
  - - Canarium urceus
    - - Conomurex luhuanus
      - - Tricornis raninus
        - - Lambis lambis
          - - Strombus
            - - Eustrombus
              - Aliger

A simplified version of the phylogeny and relationships of Strombidae according to Simone (2005)

- - - - - - - - - - Strombus gallus
                  - Strombus gigas
                - Strombus costatus
              - - Strombus raninus
                - Strombus peruvianus
            - Strombus galeatus
          - Strombus latus
        - - - - Strombus pugilis
              - Strombus alatus
            - Strombus gracilior
          - Strombus granulatus

Phylogeny and relationships of Eastern Pacific and Atlantic Strombus species, according to Latiolais and colleagues (2006)

The phylogenetic relationships among the Strombidae have been mainly accessed on two occasions, using two methods. In 2005, Simone proposed a cladogram (a tree of descent) based on an extensive morpho-anatomical analysis of representatives of Aporrhaidae, Strombidae, Xenophoridae and Struthiolariidae, including L. raninus (there referred to as Tricornis raninus).

With the exception of Lambis and Terebellum, the remaining taxa were previously allocated within the genus Strombus. However, according to Simone, only Strombus gracilior, Strombus alatus and Strombus pugilis, the type species, remained within Strombus, as they constituted a distinct group based on at least five synapomorphies (traits that are shared by two or more taxa and their most recent common ancestor). The remaining taxa were previously considered as subgenera, and were elevated to genus level by Simone in the end of his analysis. The genus Tricornis (now considered a synonym of Lobatus), in this case, only included T. raninus (now considered a synonym of Lobatus raninus).

A different approach, this time based on sequences of nuclear histone H3 and mitochondrial cytochrome-c oxidase I (COI) genes was proposed by Latiolais et al. (2006). The phylogenic relations of (32 analyzed) species that used to belong or still belong in the genus Strombus and Lambis are shown below:

== Distribution ==
This species is distributed in the Caribbean Sea, the Gulf of Mexico and the Lesser Antilles.

== Ecology ==
Habitat

S. raninus lives near seagrass beds, usually in shallow water. The minimum recorded depth is 0.3 m; the maximum recorded depth is 55 m.

Feeding

Like other species of the genus Strombus, S. raninus is known to be a herbivore.
