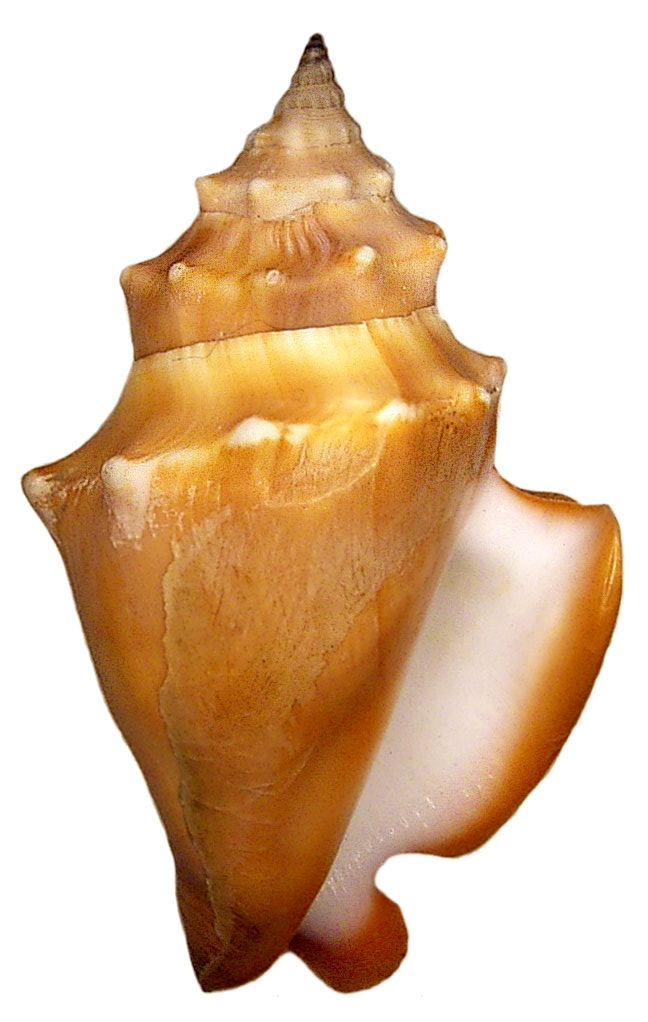
- Apertural view of a shell of the Eastern Pacific fighting conch, Strombus gracilior

Scientific classification
- Kingdom: Animalia
- Phylum: Mollusca
- Class: Gastropoda
- Subclass: Caenogastropoda
- Order: Littorinimorpha
- Family: Strombidae
- Genus: Strombus
- Species: S. gracilior

Binomial name
- Strombus gracilior Sowerby I, 1925

= Strombus gracilior =

Strombus gracilior Temporal range: Pleistocene–Recent

Species of gastropod

Strombus gracilior, common names the Eastern Pacific fighting conch, or the Panama fighting conch, is a species of medium to large sea snail, a marine gastropod mollusk in the family Strombidae, the true conchs.

== Description ==
The length of the shell varies between 40 mm and 95 mm, the width may attain 50 mm. The high spire is covered with subsutural spines or pointed nodes on the shoulder of the whorls. The color of the shell is yellowish to yellowish-brown, interrupted in the middle with a lighter band. The aperture and the large outer lip is white bordered with orange-brown. The shell is covered with a thin, horn-covered periostracum.

The fighting conch (Strombus pugilis) from the Caribbean Sea and the Gulf of Mexico is a similar species in the sculpture of the shell and in inner morphological characters.

== Phylogeny ==
- Strombidae
  - Terebellum terebellum
  - - Canarium urceus
    - - Conomurex luhuanus
      - - Tricornis raninus
        - - Lambis lambis
          - - Strombus
            - - Eustrombus
              - Aliger

A simplified version of the phylogeny and relationships of Strombidae according to Simone (2005)

- - - - - - - - - - Strombus gallus
                  - Strombus gigas
                - Strombus costatus
              - - Strombus raninus
                - Strombus peruvianus
            - Strombus galeus
          - Strombus latus
        - - - - Strombus pugilis
              - Strombus alatus
            - Strombus gracilior
          - Strombus granulatus

Phylogeny and relationships of Eastern Pacific and Atlantic Strombus species, according to Latiolais et al. (2006)

The phylogenetic relationships among the Strombidae have been mainly accessed on two occasions, using two distinct methods. In a 2005 monography, Simone proposed a cladogram (a tree of descent) based on an extensive morpho-anatomical analysis of representatives of Aporrhaidae, Strombidae, Xenophoridae and Struthiolariidae. However, according to Simone, only Strombus gracilior, Strombus alatus and Strombus pugilis, the type species, remained within Strombus. In Simone's cladogram, these three species constituted a distinct group based on at least five synapomorphies (traits that are shared by two or more taxa and their most recent common ancestor). The remaining taxa were previously considered as subgenera, and were elevated to genus level by Simone in the end of his analysis.

In a different approach, Latiolais and colleagues (2006) proposed another cladogram that attempts to show the phylogenetic relationships of 34 species within the family Strombidae. The authors analysed 31 species in the genus Strombus and three species in the allied genus Lambis. The cladogram was based on DNA sequences of both nuclear histone H3 and mitochondrial cytochrome-c oxidase I protein-coding gene regions. In this proposed phylogeny, Strombus pugilis, Strombus alatus, Strombus granulatus and Strombus gracilior are closely related and appear to share a common ancestor.

== Distribution ==
This species is can be found on sandflats and lagoons and offshore to 45 m in the Gulf of California along West Mexico and in the Pacific Ocean along Northern Peru.
