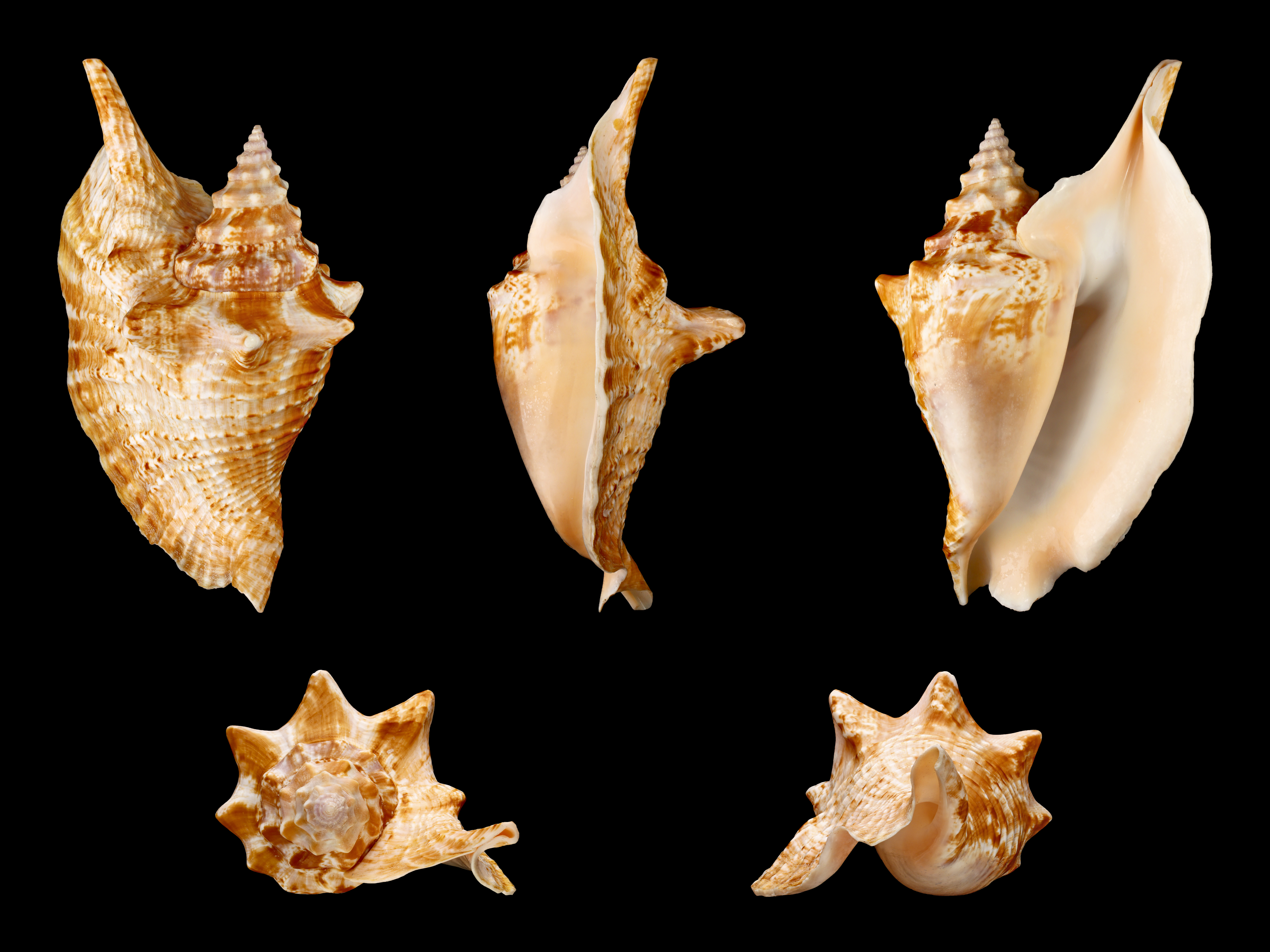
- A shell of the rooster conch, Aliger gallus.

Scientific classification
- Kingdom: Animalia
- Phylum: Mollusca
- Class: Gastropoda
- Subclass: Caenogastropoda
- Order: Littorinimorpha
- Family: Strombidae
- Genus: Aliger
- Species: A. gallus

Binomial name
- Aliger gallus (Linnaeus, 1758)

Synonyms
- Lambis velum Röding, 1798; Lobatus gallus (Linnaeus, 1758); Strombus gallus Linnaeus, 1758 (original combination); Strombus solitaris Perry, 1811

= Aliger gallus =

Species of gastropod

Aliger gallus, previously known as Strombus gallus, common name the rooster conch or rooster-tail conch, is a species of medium-sized sea snail, a marine gastropod mollusk in the family Strombidae, the true conchs.

== Distribution ==
This species is found from southeast Florida and Bermuda through the West Indies and south to Brazil.

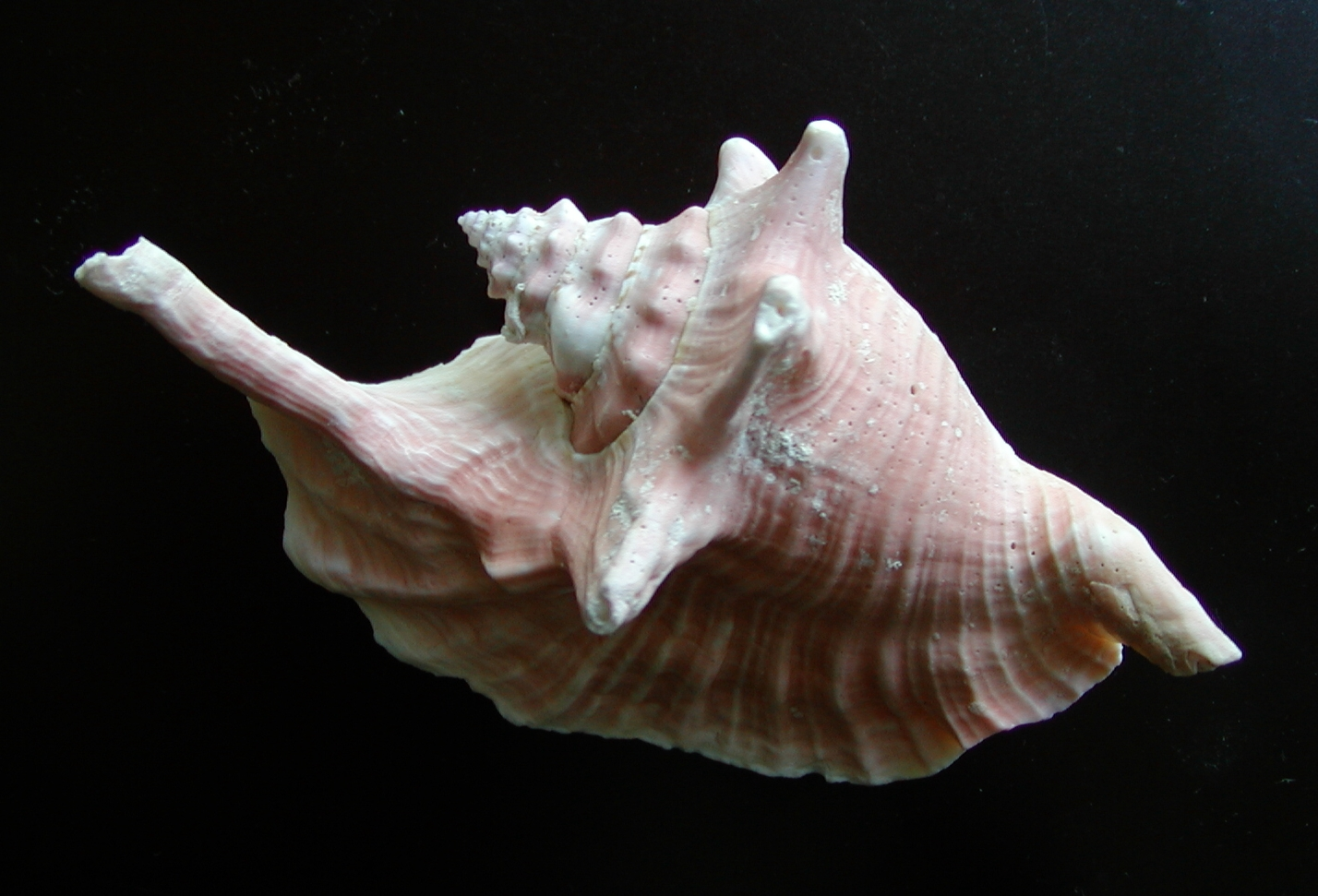
A shell of Aliger gallus from Haiti

== Description ==
The average shell length of this species is about 12.5 cm.

The maximum recorded shell length is 197 mm.

== Habitat ==
The minimum recorded depth for this species is 0.3 m.; the maximum recorded depth is 82 m.

== Phylogeny ==
- Strombidae
  - Terebellum terebellum
  - - Canarium urceus
    - - Conomurex luhuanus
      - - Tricornis raninus
        - - Lambis lambis
          - - Strombus
            - - Eustrombus
              - Aliger

A simplified version of the phylogeny and relationships of Strombidae according to Simone (2005)

- - - - - - - Strombus gallus
            - Strombus gigas
          - Strombus costatus
        - - Strombus raninus
          - Strombus peruvianus
      - Strombus galeus
    - Strombus latus
  - - - - Strombus pugilis
        - Strombus alatus
      - Strombus gracilior
    - Strobus granulatus

Part of the Phylogeny and relationships of Strombidae according to Latiolais (2006)

The phylogenetic relationships among the Strombidae have been mainly accessed on two occasions, by Simone (2005) and Latiolais (2006), using two distinct methods. Simone proposed a cladogram (a tree of descent) based on an extensive morpho-anatomical analysis of representatives of Aporrhaidae, Strombidae, Xenophoridae and Struthiolariidae, which included L. gallus (there referred to as Aliger gallus).

With the exception of Lambis and Terebellum, the remaining taxa were previously allocated within the genus Strombus, including L. gallus. However, according to Simone, only Strombus gracilior, Strombus alatus and Strombus pugilis, the type species, remained within Strombus, as they constituted a distinct group based on at least five synapomorphies (traits that are shared by two or more taxa and their most recent common ancestor). The remaining taxa were previously considered as subgenera, and were elevated to genus level by Simone in the end of his analysis. The genus Aliger (now considered a synonym of Lobatus), in this case, included Aliger gallus (now considered a synonym of Lobatus gallus) and Aliger costatus (= Lobatus costatus), which were thus considered closely related.

In a different approach, Latiolais and colleagues (2006) proposed another cladogram that attempts to show the phylogenetic relationships of 34 species within the family Strombidae. The authors analysed 31 species in the genus Strombus includingLobatus gallus (there referred to as Strombus gallus), and three species in the allied genus Lambis. The cladogram was based on DNA sequences of both nuclear histone H3 and mitochondrial cytochrome-c oxidase I (COI) protein-coding gene regions. In this proposed phylogeny, Strombus gigas (= Lobatus gigas) and Strombus gallus are closely related and appear to share a common ancestor.
