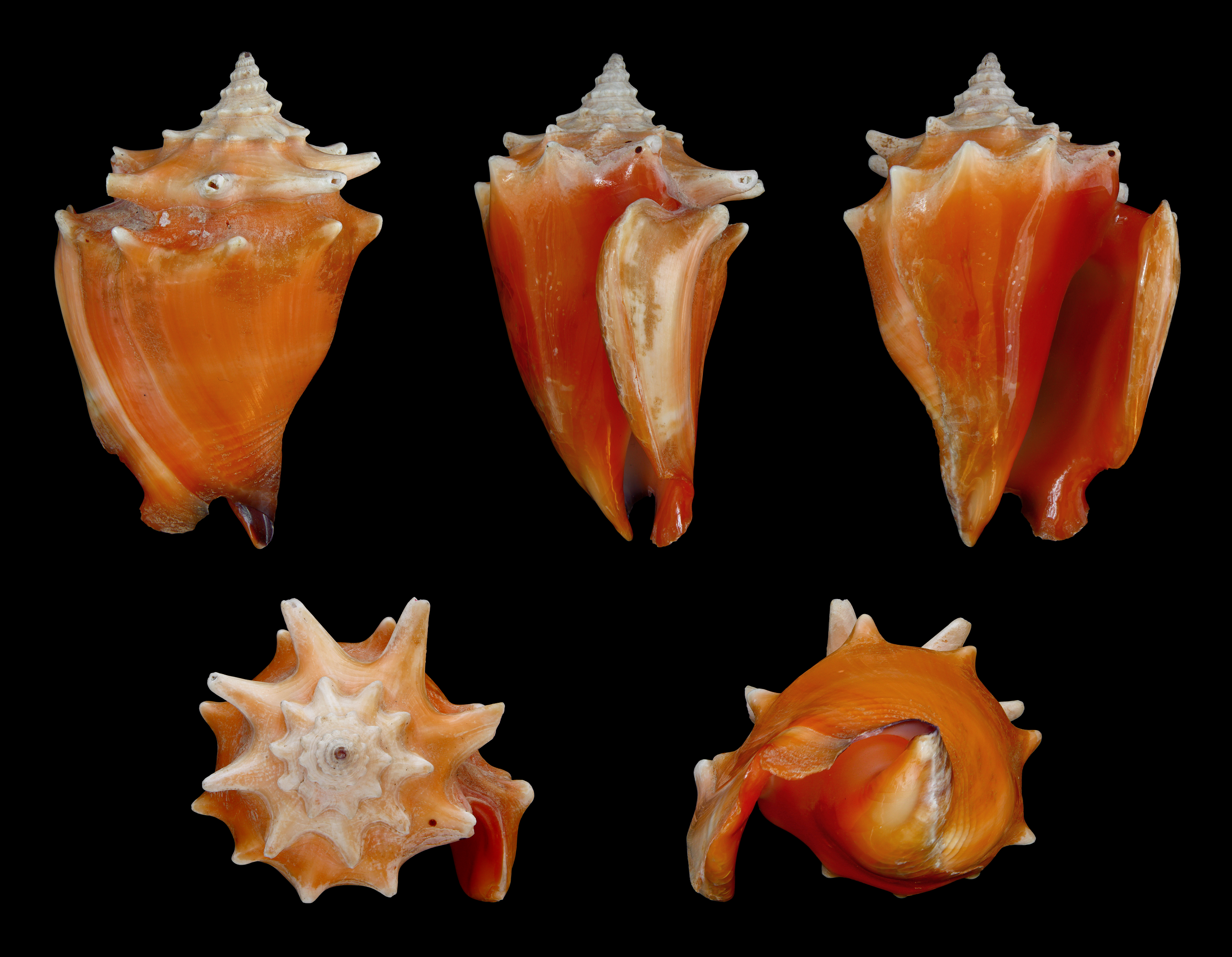
- Five views of a shell of Strombus pugilis

Scientific classification
- Kingdom: Animalia
- Phylum: Mollusca
- Class: Gastropoda
- Subclass: Caenogastropoda
- Order: Littorinimorpha
- Family: Strombidae
- Genus: Strombus
- Species: S. pugilis

Binomial name
- Strombus pugilis Linnaeus, 1758

Synonyms
- Drillia actinocycla Dall & Simpson, 1901 (Described from the protoconch and early whorls of Strombus pugilis); Pyramis striata Röding, 1798; Strombus cornutus Perry, 1811; Strombus nicaraguensis Fluck, 1905; Strombus peculiaris M. Smith, 1940; Strombus pugilis peculiaris M. Smith, 1940; Strombus pugilis worki Petuch, 1993; Strombus sloani Leach, 1814; Strombus worki Petuch, 1993

= Strombus pugilis =

Fighting conch

Species of gastropod

Strombus pugilis, common names the fighting conch and the West Indian fighting conch, is a species of medium to large sea snail, a marine gastropod mollusk in the family Strombidae, the true conchs.

S. pugilis is similar in appearance to Strombus alatus, the Florida fighting conch.

== Shell description ==
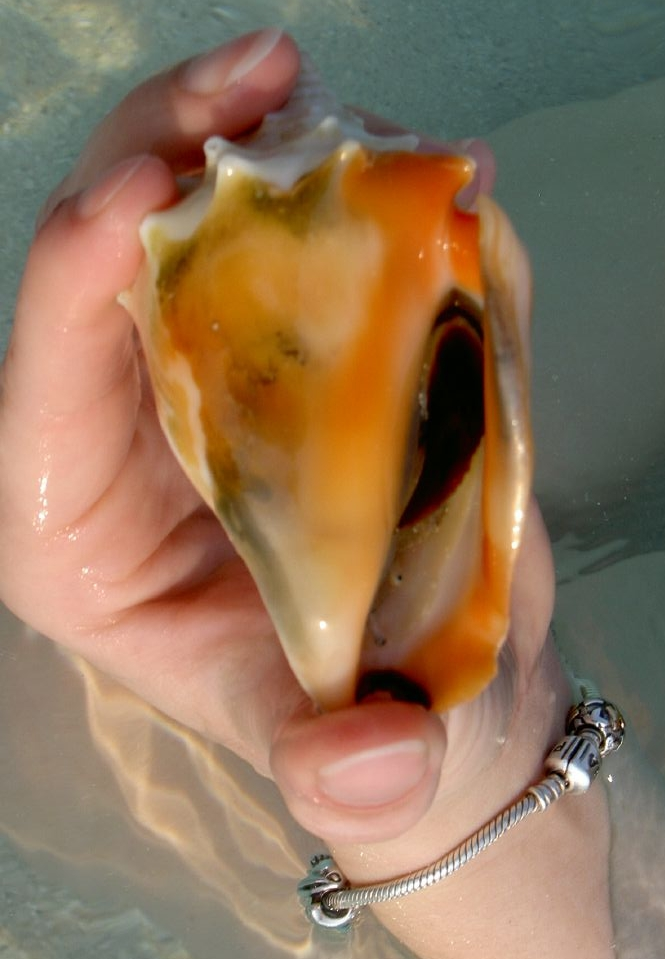
Apertural view of a live but retracted Strombus pugilis out of water in a human hand showing the brown operculum

The maximum recorded shell length is 110 mm or up to 130 mm, commonly to 90 mm.

Like other species in the same genus, Strombus pugilis has a robust, somewhat heavy and solid shell, with a characteristic stromboid notch. It has a well-developed body whorl and a short and pointed spire. It presents 8 to 9 whorls, each of them having a single row of subsutural spines, becoming larger towards the last whorl. These spines, however, may be less conspicuous or even absent in some populations. Its aperture is relatively long and slightly oblique. The posterior angle of the outer lip is distinct, projecting in the posterior direction in an erect fashion. The operculum is sickle-shaped, similar to several other Strombus snails.

The shell color varies from salmon-pink, cream or yellow to light or strong orange, and the interior of the aperture is usually white. The anterior end presents a dark purple stain, which is one of the diagnostic characters of this species, and is absent in Strombus alatus.

This species is closely similar to Strombus alatus, which has a more northerly range. Strombus alatus shells have less prominent subsutural spines and a slightly more projected outer lip. Some scientists have treated the two as distinct species; others as subspecies. In an extensive study of the Stromboidea in 2005, Simone provisionally treated them as distinct species, but observed that "no spectacular morphological difference was found [and] all related differences, even those of the genital system, can be regarded as extreme of variation of a single, wide distributed, variable species."

== Distribution ==
Strombus pugilis lives in Bermuda, southeastern Florida, the Caribbean Sea (as far east as Barbados) and south to Brazil.

== Phylogeny ==
- - - - - - - - - - Strombus gallus
                  - Strombus gigas
                - Strombus costatus
              - - Strombus raninus
                - Strombus peruvianus
            - Strombus galeus
          - Strombus latus
        - - - - Strombus pugilis
              - Strombus alatus
            - Strombus gracilior
          - Strombus granulatus

Phylogeny and relationships of Eastern Pacific and Atlantic Strombus species, according to Latiolais et al. (2006)

A cladogram based on sequences of nuclear histone H3 gene and mitochondrial cytochrome-c oxidase I gene showing phylogenetic relationships of (32 analyzed) species in the genus Strombus and Lambis, including Strombus pugilis, was proposed by Latiolais et al (2006). In this hypothesis, Strombus pugilis and Strombus alatus apparently share a common ancestor, and are possibly close related.

== Ecology ==
=== Habitat ===
This sea snail lives on sandy and muddy bottoms, from the intertidal zone to depths between 2 and 10 m. The minimum recorded depth for this species is 0 m; the maximum recorded depth is 55 m.

=== Life cycle ===
During a long period in the initial stages of its development, the Strombus pugilis larvae feed mainly on plankton. Studies indicate that some populations of Strombus pugilis may reproduce throughout the year.

Reproduction orgies have been observed, on silty sand at 8–10 m. depth, with egg cases littering the bottom, and obvious copulation in progress across a fairly large area.

=== Feeding habits ===
Strombus pugilis is known to be a herbivore, feeding on plants and algae.

== Human uses ==
The flesh of Strombus pugilis is edible. It is usually cooked by boiling, and is consumed by local fishermen. S. pugilis is used as a zootherapeutical product for the treatment of sexual impotence in the traditional Brazilian medicine of the Northeast region of Brazil. The shell is commonly used as a decorative item and is sold in local markets as a souvenir.

=== Imposex ===
The phenomenon known as imposex, the development of nonfunctional male sexual organs in female individuals, has been observed in S. pugilis. This condition is triggered by exposure to organic tin compounds such as tributyltin and triphenyltin, is irreversible, and can have severe consequences for the species, ranging from individual sterilization to potential population collapse. Organotin compounds were commonly used as biocides and antifouling agents, added to marine paints to prevent organisms from growing on the hulls of boats and ships. As a result, high concentrations often accumulated in the waters around shipyards and docking areas, posing a serious threat to nearby marine life through prolonged exposure.
