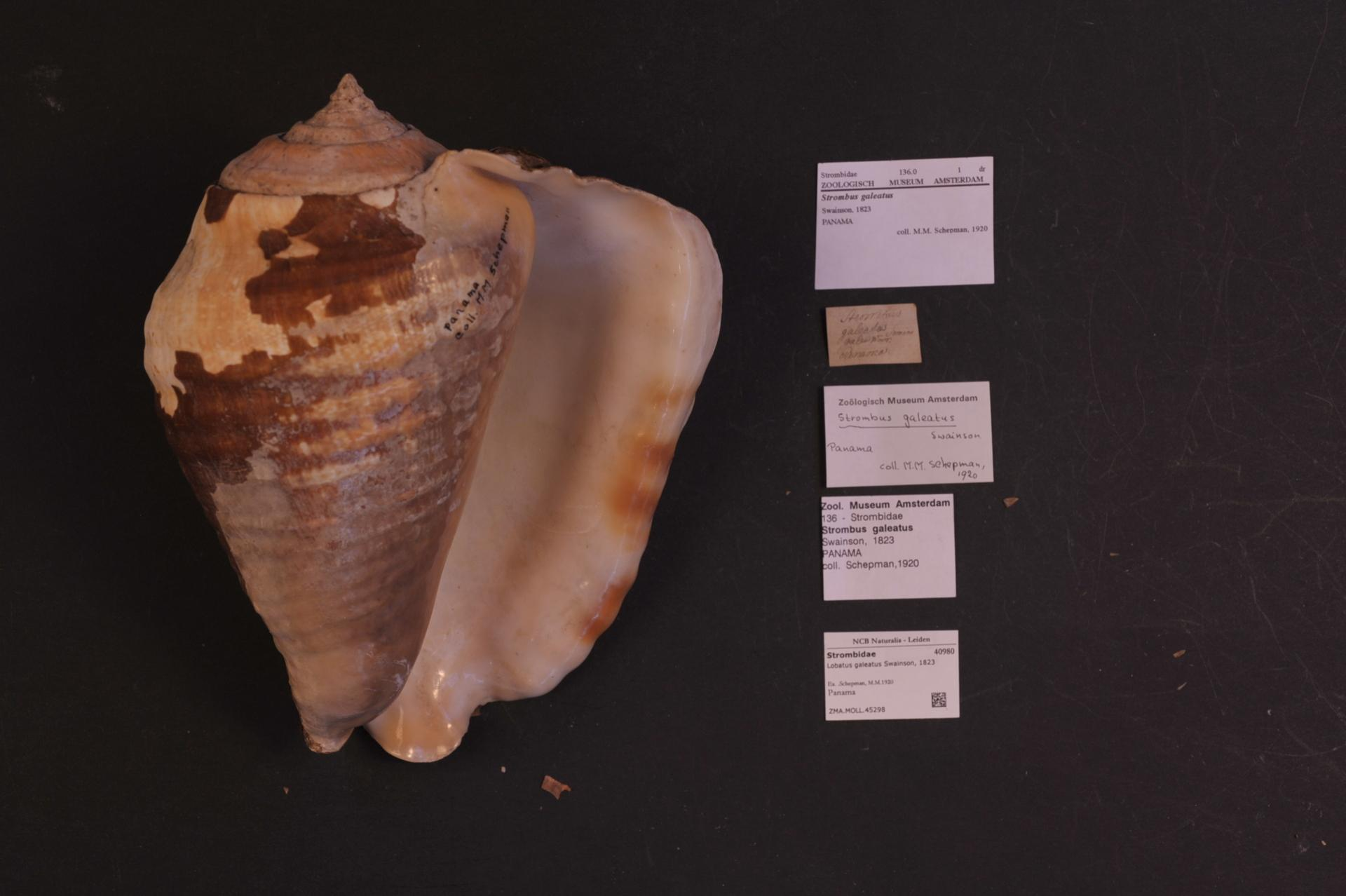
- Apertural view of a shell of Titanostrombus galeatus from a museum collection

Scientific classification
- Kingdom: Animalia
- Phylum: Mollusca
- Class: Gastropoda
- Subclass: Caenogastropoda
- Order: Littorinimorpha
- Superfamily: Stromboidea
- Family: Strombidae
- Genus: Titanostrombus; Petuch, 1994

Type species
- Strombus galeatus Swainson, 1823

= Titanostrombus =

Genus of gastropods

Titanostrombus is a genus of sea snails, marine gastropod mollusks in the family Strombidae, the true conchs.

== Species ==
Species within the genus Titanostrombus include:

- Titanostrombus galeatus (Swainson, 1823)
- Titanostrombus goliath (Schröter, 1805)
