= Johann Samuel Schröter =

German Protestant pastor and scientist (1735–1808)

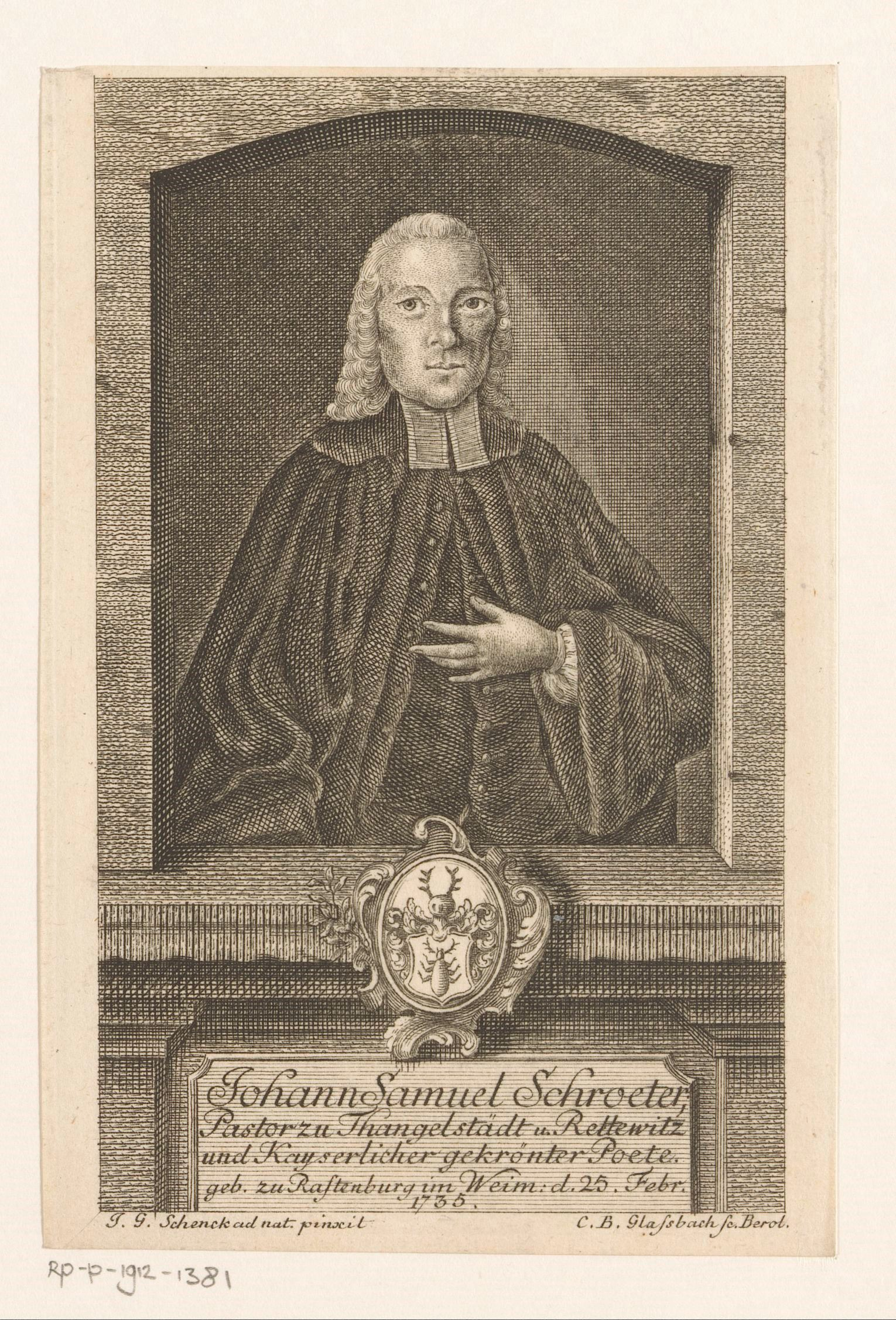

Johann Samuel Schröter (25 February 1735, Rastenberg – 24 March 1808, Buttstädt) was a German Protestant pastor since 1763, who was also a conchologist, mineralogist and palaeontologist. He was a member of the Academy of Sciences Leopoldina.

Schröter studied natural sciences as well as theology at the University of Jena. After finishing his studies he served as rector at the school in Dornburg. In 1763 he became a pastor in Thangelstedt, and later on, a preacher in Weimar. At the time of his death, he was superintendent and first preacher in Buttstädt.

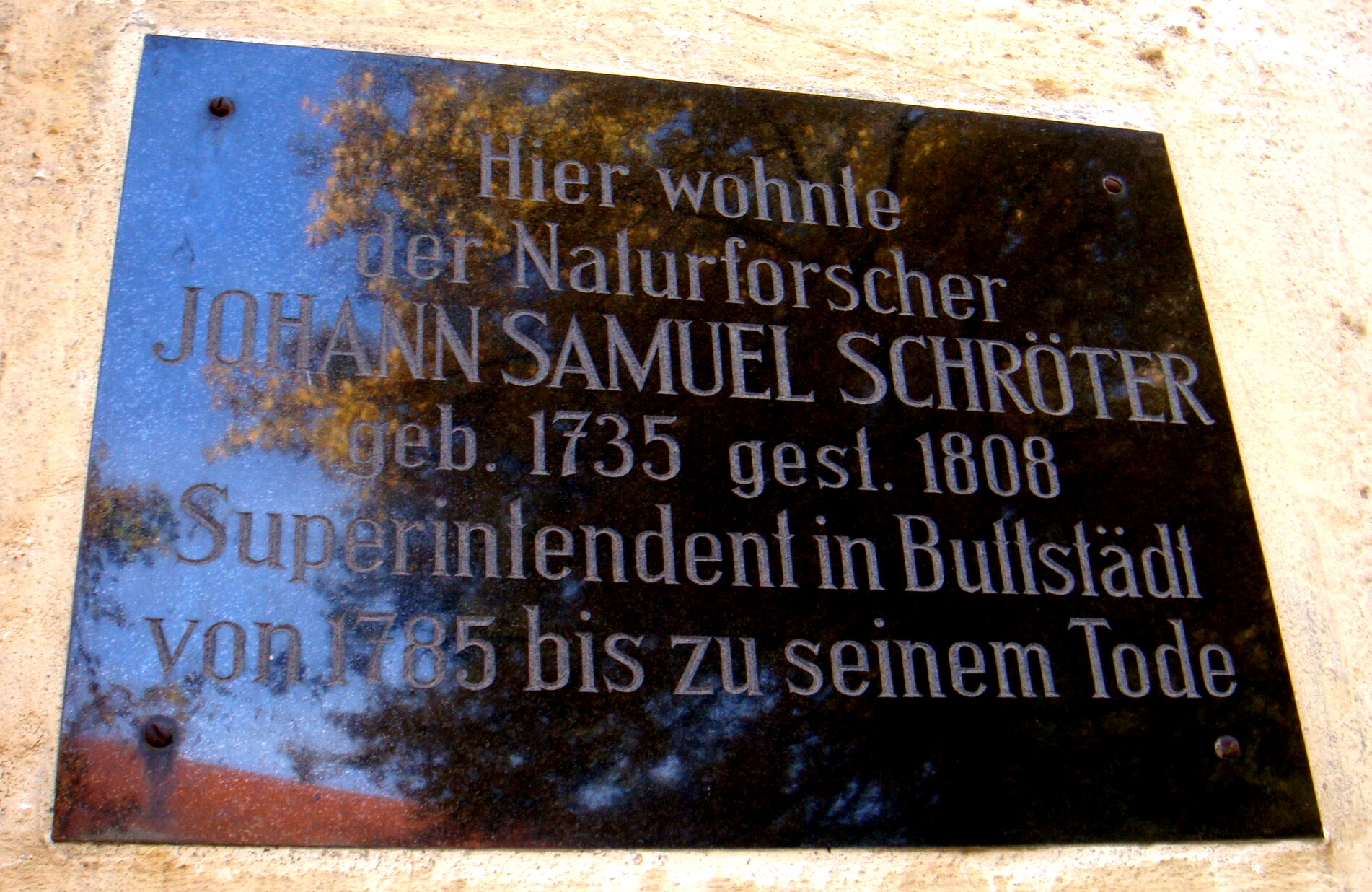
Commemorative plaque of Schröter in Buttstädt

== Taxa described ==
Taxa described by Johann Samuel Schröter include:

- Eustrombus goliath (Schröter, 1805).
- Isognomostoma isognomostomos (Schröter, 1784).

== Selected works ==
- Versuch einer systematischen abhandlung über die erdconchylien, sonderlich derer, welche um Thangelstedt gefunden werden, 1771 – Essay of a systematic treatise on terrestrial conchology, especially specimens found near Thangelstedt.
- Journal für die Liebhaber des Steinrechs und der Konchyliologie; 6 volumes, 1774–80 – Journal for lovers of stonerechs and conchology.
- Vollständige einleitung in die kenntniss und geschichte der steine und versteinerungen; 4 volumes, 1774–84 – Comprehensive introduction to the knowledge and history of stones and fossils.
- Abhandlungen über verschiedene Gegenstände der Naturgeschichte, 1777 – Treatises on various objects of natural history.
- Die Geschichte der Flussconchylien : mit vorzüglicher Rücksicht auf diejenigen welche in den thüringischen Wassern leben, 1779 – The history of river mollusks: with consideration for those living in Thuringian waterways.
- Einleitung in die Concylienkenntniss nach Linné, 1783 – Introduction to conchology according to Linnaeus.
- Ueber den innern Bau der See- und einiger ausländischen Erd- und Flussschnecken ein Versuch, 1783 – On the inner structure of sea and some foreign terrestrial and river snails.
- Neue Litteratur und Beyträge zur Kenntniß der Naturgeschichte vorzüglich der Conchylien und Foßilien, 1784 – New literature and a contribution to the knowledge of natural history regarding mollusks and fossils.
- Die Aesthetik der Blumen; oder Ihre Philosophiem 1803 – The aesthetics of flowers; a philosophy.
- Abhandlung von den Nautiliden der Weimarischen Gegend. Der Naturforscher, 1. Stück, Gebauer, Halle 1774, S. 132–158
- Abhandlung von den Ammoniten der Weimarischen Gegend. Der Naturforscher 2. Stück, Gebauer, Halle 1774, S. 169–193
