= Stromboid notch =

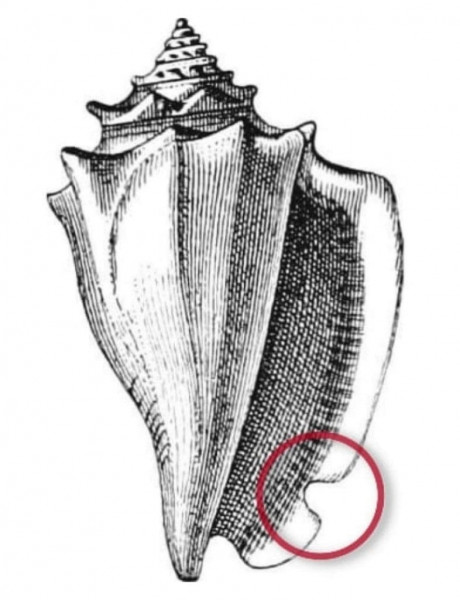
Detail of the stromboid notch in Strombidae seashell (Strombus sp.). Image taken from the book Dr. Johannes Leunis Synopsis der thierkunde. Ein handbuch für höhere lehranstalten und für alle, welche sich wissenschaftlich mit der naturgeschichte der thiere beschäftigen wollen (1883); by Johannes Leunis and Hubert Ludwig.

The stromboid notch is an anatomical feature which is found in the shell of one taxonomic family of medium-sized to large sea snails, the conches.

Marine gastropods in the family Strombidae have a notch in the edge of the shell aperture not far from the siphonal canal. This indentation is called the stromboid notch. Its function is to enable the animal to extend one of its two stalked eyes out through the notch when the animal is active.

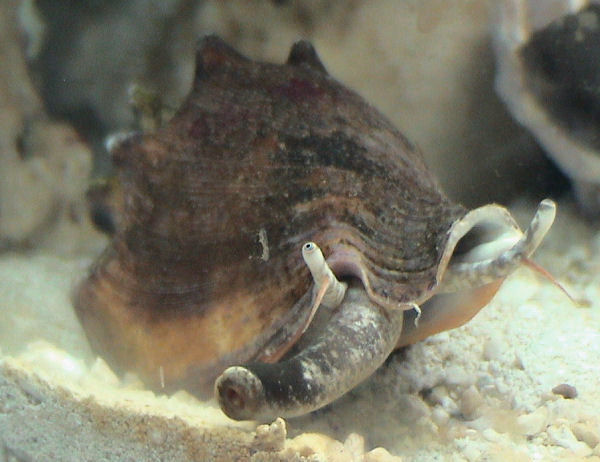
This Strombus alatus shows its siphon in front and stalked eyes behind. The eye stalk on the left in the image is protruding through the stromboid notch.

== See also ==
- Strombus
- siphonal notch
- siphonal canal
