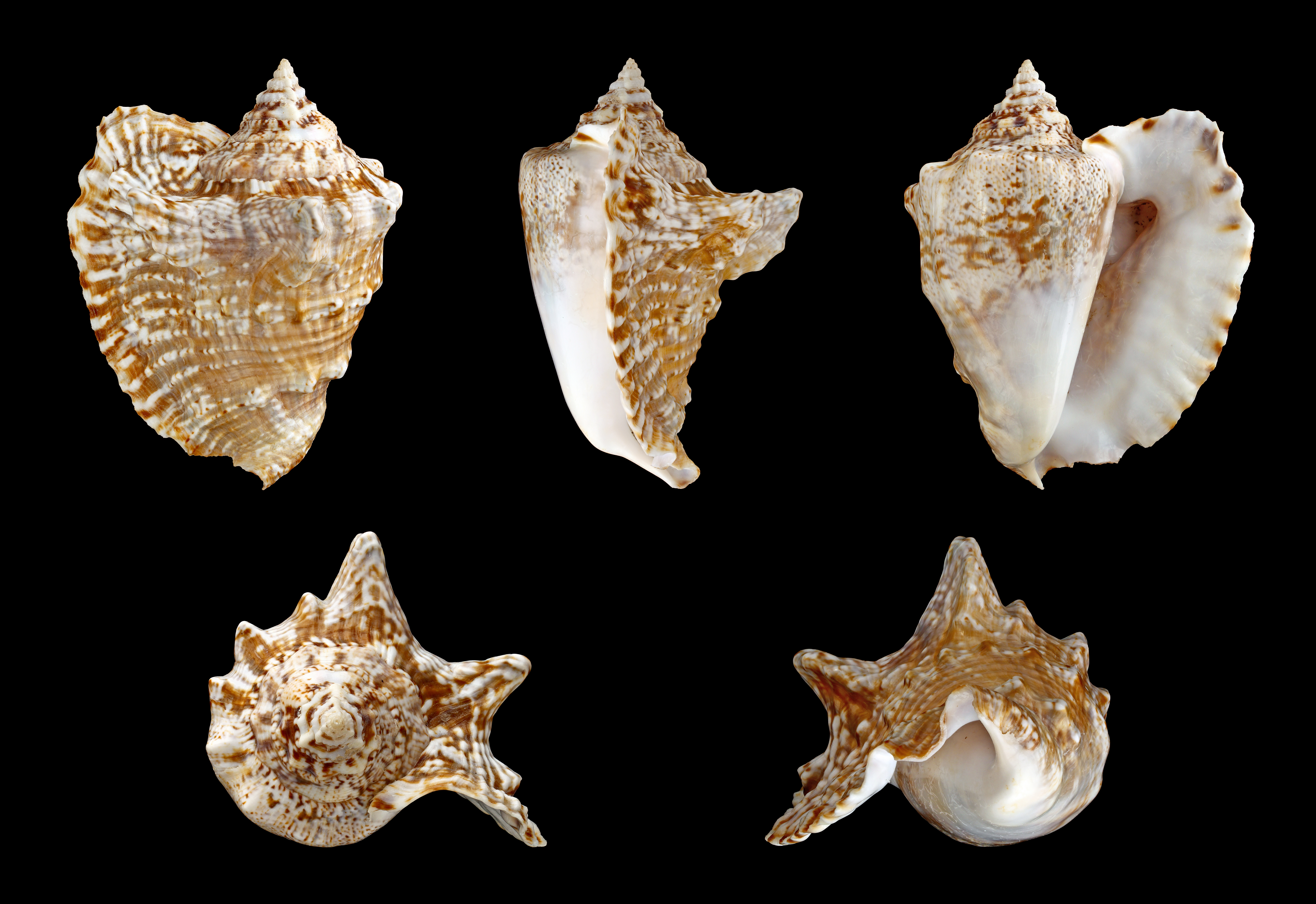
- Lobatus raninus

Scientific classification
- Kingdom: Animalia
- Phylum: Mollusca
- Class: Gastropoda
- Subclass: Caenogastropoda
- Order: Littorinimorpha
- Family: Strombidae
- Genus: Lobatus; Swainson, 1837

Type species
- Strombus bituberculatus Lamarck, 1822

= Lobatus =

Genus of gastropods

Lobatus is a genus of very large sea snails, marine gastropod mollusks in the family Strombidae, the true conchs. Some of the species within this genus were previously placed in the genus Eustrombus.

== Species ==
Living and fossil species within the genus Lobatus include:

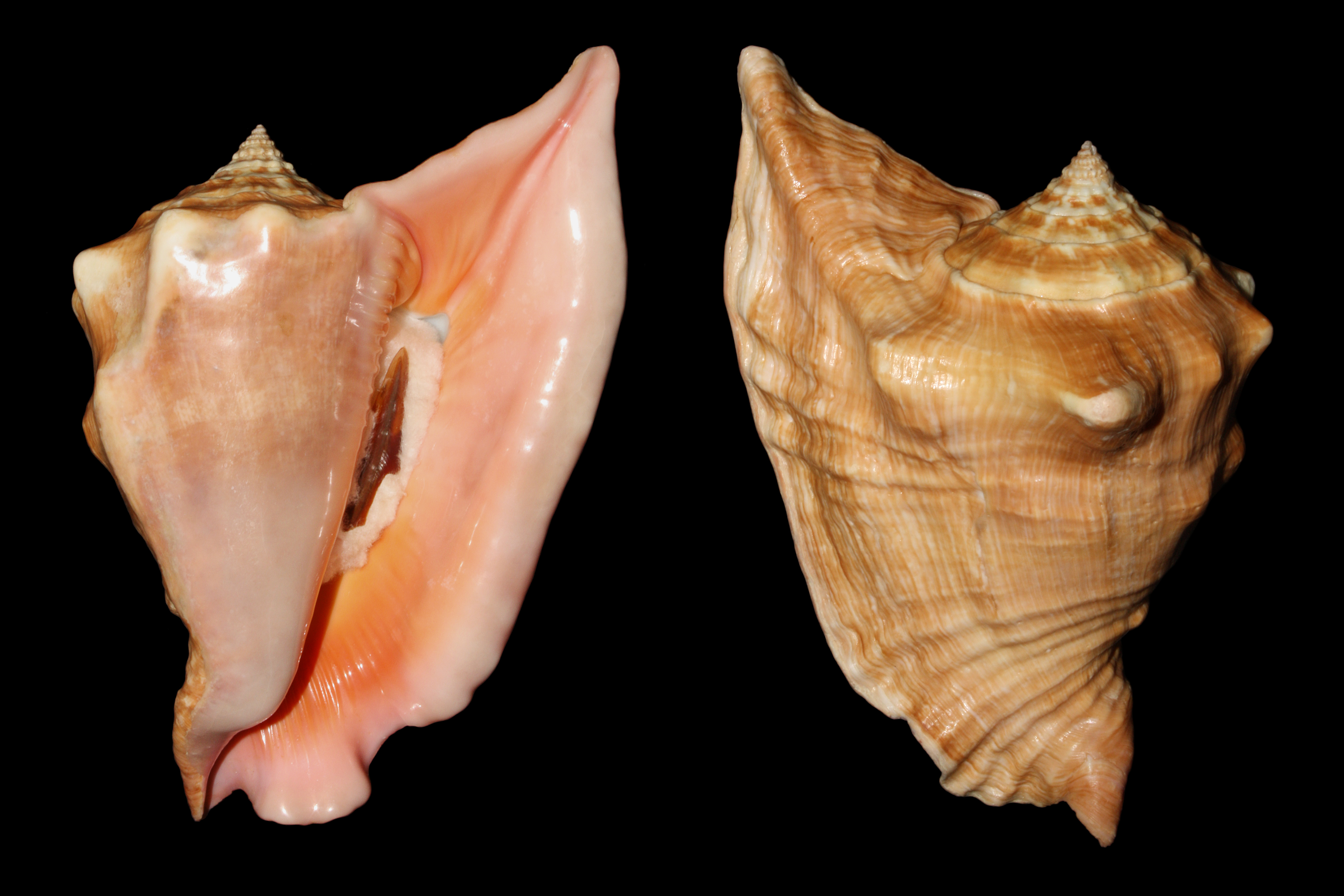
Apertural and abapertural views of a shell of Lobatus peruvianus

- Lobatus peruvianus (Swainson, 1823)
- Lobatus raninus (Gmelin, 1791)
- †Lobatus dominator (Pilsbry, 1917)
- †Lobatus galliformis (Pilsbry, 1917)
- †Lobatus haitensis (Sowerby, 1850)
- †Lobatus leidyi (Heilprin, 1887)
- †Lobatus vokesae Landau et al., 2008
- †Lobatus williamsi (Olson & Petit, 1964)

Species brought into synonymy include:

- Lobatus costatus (Gmelin, 1791) accepted as Macrostrombus costatus (Gmelin, 1791)
- Lobatus galeatus (Swainson, 1823) accepted as Titanostrombus galeatus (Swainson, 1823)
- Lobatus gallus (Linnaeus, 1758) accepted as Aliger gallus (Linnaeus, 1758)
- Lobatus gigas (Linnaeus, 1758) accepted as Aliger gigas (Linnaeus, 1758)
- Lobatus goliath (Schröter, 1805) accepted as Titanostrombus goliath (Schröter, 1805)
- Lobatus magolecciai (Macsotay & Campos, 2001) accepted as Lobatus raninus (Gmelin, 1791) (junior subjective synonym)
