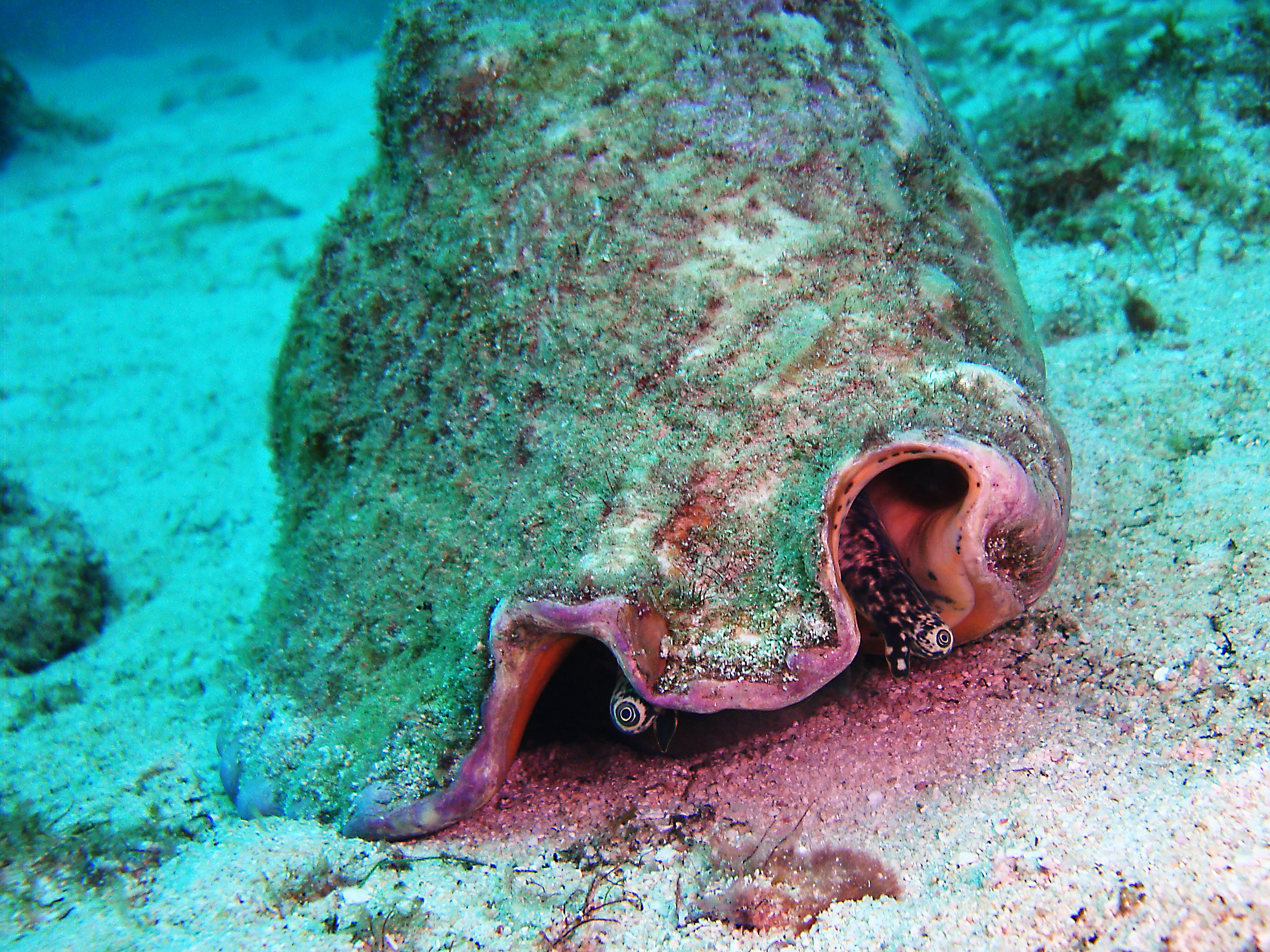
- Aliger gigas

Scientific classification
- Kingdom: Animalia
- Phylum: Mollusca
- Class: Gastropoda
- Subclass: Caenogastropoda
- Order: Littorinimorpha
- Superfamily: Stromboidea
- Family: Strombidae
- Genus: Aliger; Thiele, 1929

Type species
- Strombus gallus Linnaeus, 1758

Synonyms
- Eustrombus Wenz, 1940; Strombus (Aliger) Thiele, 1929 (original rank); Strombus (Eustrombus) Wenz, 1940

= Aliger =

Genus of gastropods

Aliger is a genus of sea snails, marine gastropod mollusks in the family Strombidae, the true conchs.

Aliger was previously a synonym of Lobatus Swainson, 1837

== Species ==
Species within the genus Aliger include:

- †Aliger dominator (Pilsbry & Johnson, 1917)
- †Aliger galliformis (Pilsbry & Johnson, 1917)
- Aliger gallus (Linnaeus, 1758):
- Aliger gigas (Linnaeus, 1758)

Species brought into synonymy:

- Aliger costatus (Gmelin, 1791): synonym of Lobatus costatus (Gmelin, 1791)
