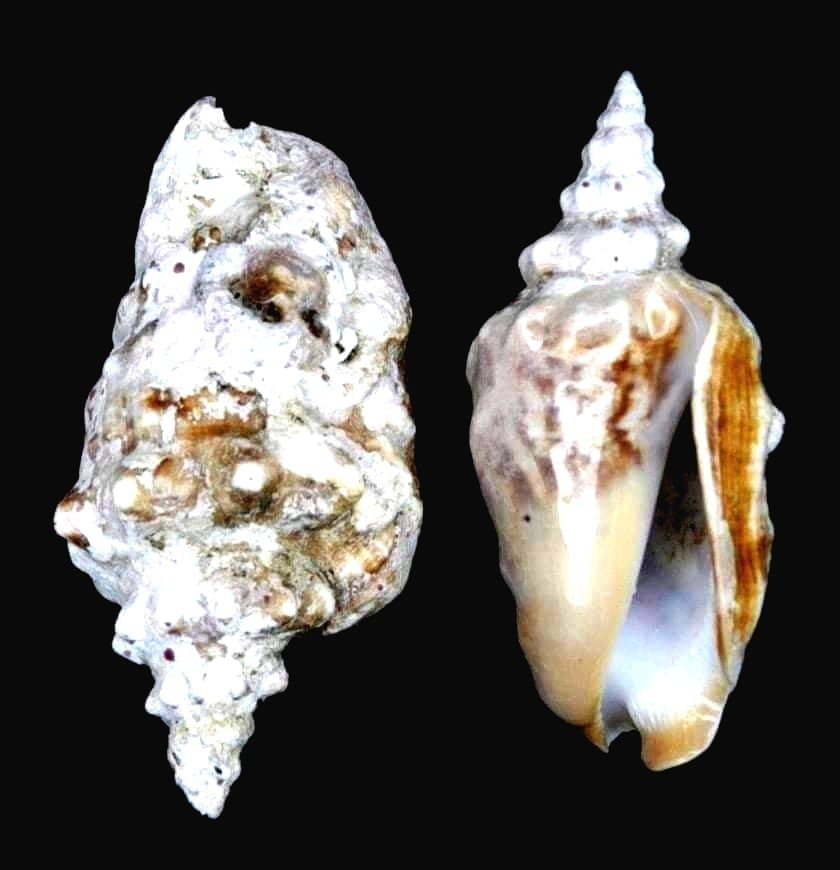

Scientific classification
- Kingdom: Animalia
- Phylum: Mollusca
- Class: Gastropoda
- Subclass: Caenogastropoda
- Order: Littorinimorpha
- Family: Strombidae
- Genus: Persististrombus
- Species: P. granulatus

Binomial name
- Persististrombus granulatus (Swainson, 1822)

Synonyms
- Strombus granulatus Swainson, 1822

= Persististrombus granulatus =

Species of gastropod

Persististrombus granulatus is a species of gastropods belonging to the family Strombidae.

The species is found in America.
