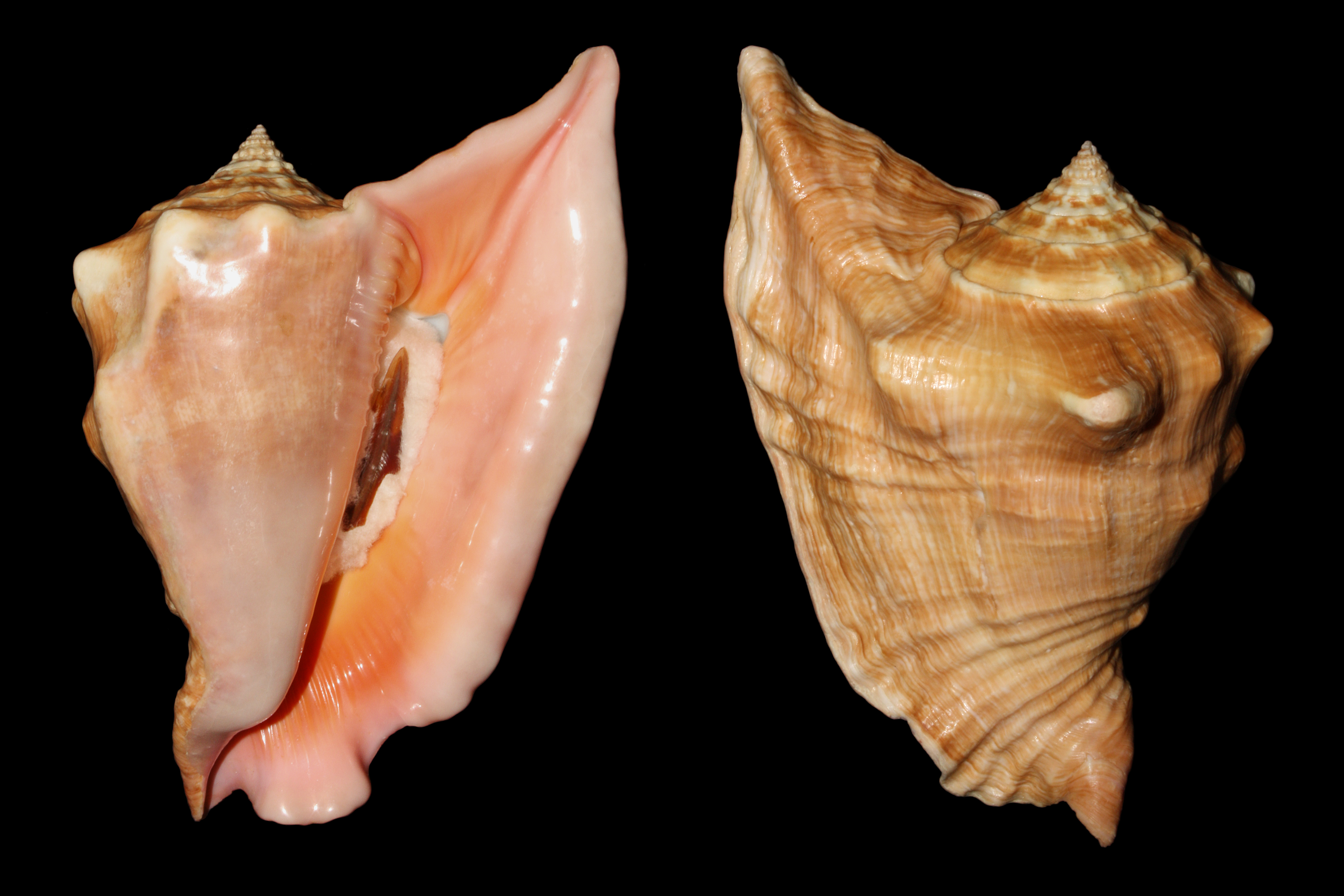
- Apertural (left) and abapertural (right) views of a shell of Lobatus peruvianus

Scientific classification
- Kingdom: Animalia
- Phylum: Mollusca
- Class: Gastropoda
- Subclass: Caenogastropoda
- Order: Littorinimorpha
- Family: Strombidae
- Genus: Lobatus
- Species: L. peruvianus

Binomial name
- Lobatus peruvianus (Swainson, 1823)

Synonyms
- Strombus peruvianus Swainson, 1823 (basionym)

= Lobatus peruvianus =

Species of gastropod

Lobatus peruvianus, commonly known as the Peruvian conch or the cock's comb conch, is a species of large sea snail, a marine gastropod mollusk in the family Strombidae, the true conchs and their allies.

== Distribution ==
Lobatus peruvianus occurs along the benthic tropical coastal waters of the Eastern Pacific Ocean. Their distribution stretches across various countries and regions including the Gulf of California, Mexico, Pacific Panama, Nicaragua, Costa Rica, Ecuador, and Peru. These Peruvian Conchs are sand dwellers and are found in depths up to 130 feet.

== Description ==
The shell of Lobatus peruvianus is large, ranging from 60–210 millimetres (2.4–8.3 in). It was originally described by William Swainson in 1823, with him stating that the shell is "heavy, with a depressed spire, and a prominent tip". Like other species in the same genus, Lobatus peruvianus's outer lip is very pronounced and ornamental. The outside color of the shell falls into the tan and light brown range, sometimes also pink; while both the inner and outer lips are cream, pink, or white. While not much information is available regarding the Peruvian conch specifically, similar species in the same Genus have life spans of up to 40 years; while the majority live between 10 and 30 years.

== Behavior ==
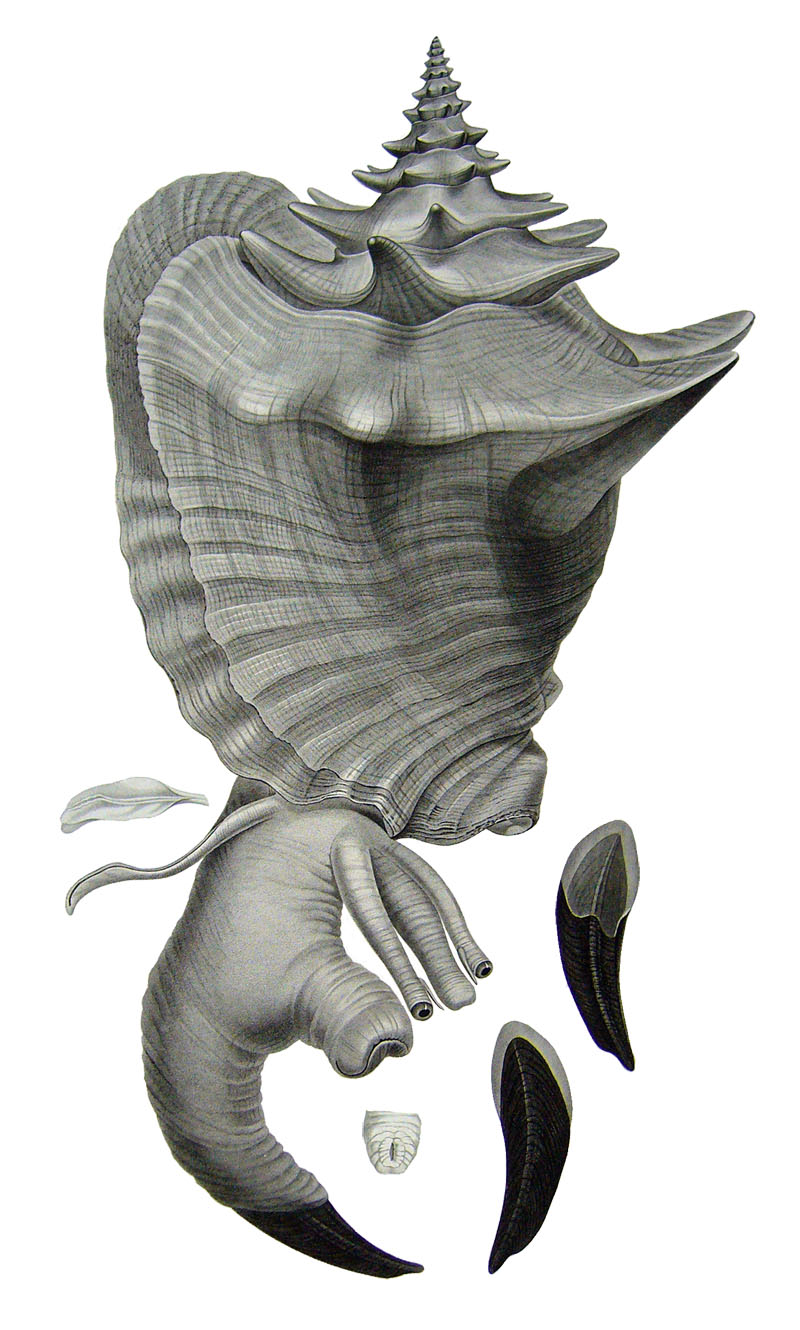
*Not a photo of Lobatus peruvianus* Their large muscular foot (which connects to the operculum) can be seen in this photo. This is what the Lobatus peruvianus uses to move itself.

Similar to other animals in the family Strombidae, Lobatus peruvianus moves around by using their muscular foot that sinks like a claw into the sand to exert force and move forward. This behavior is also beneficial in terms of predator avoidance. It causes the conch's chemical trail to be scattered and inconsistent therefore confusing predators. Similar to other conchs in the family Strombidae, Peruvian conchs can take around 5 years to reach maturity and are therefore very slow-growing creatures.

== Diet ==
This species is an algivore, which means that its diet mostly consists of algae. It locates food by scrounging over the sea-floor. Since strombids are shallow sand dwellers, they move along the sea-floor finding algae that live in shallow waters. They may also occasionally feed on detritus.

== Human Uses ==
Lobatus peruvianus is a major source of protein for many groups along the Pacific coast, and the shells have historically been used as trumpets.

Conchs are vulnerable to overfishing due to their slow growth rates and late mating tendencies; because of this, it is illegal or frowned upon to harvest these types of conch.
