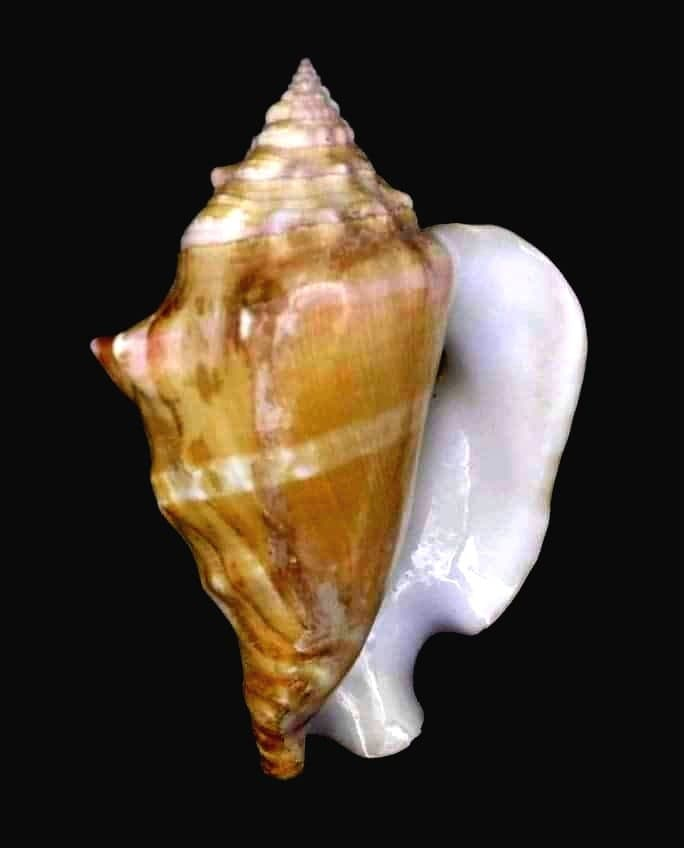

Scientific classification
- Kingdom: Animalia
- Phylum: Mollusca
- Class: Gastropoda
- Subclass: Caenogastropoda
- Order: Littorinimorpha
- Family: Strombidae
- Genus: Thetystrombus
- Species: T. latus

Binomial name
- Thetystrombus latus (Gmelin, 1791)

Synonyms
- Lambis carnaria Röding, 1798; Lambis carnea Röding, 1798; Lambis fasciatus Gmelin, 1807; Strombus adansoni DeFrance, 1827; Strombus auratus Spalowsky, 1795; Strombus bubo Deshayes, 1833; Strombus bubonius Lamarck, 1822; Strombus dilatatus Lamarck, 1822 (Invalid: junior homonym of Strombus dilatatus Swainson, 1821); Strombus fasciatus Gmelin, 1791 (Invalid: junior homonym of Strombus fasciatus Born, 1778); Strombus latus Gmelin, 1791 (basionym); Strombus latus f. arenensis Bernard, 1982 (Unavailable name: infrasubspecific (ICZN Art. 15.2)); Strombus latus f. minima Bernard, 1984 (Unavailable name: infrasubspecific (ICZN Art. 15.2)); Strombus latus f. portgentilensis Bernard, 1984 (Unavailable name: infrasubspecific (ICZN Art. 15.2)); Strombus mediterraneus Duclos, 1844

= Thetystrombus latus =

Species of gastropod

Thetystrombus latus, commonly known as the Bubonian conch, is a species of sea snail, a marine gastropod mollusk in the family Strombidae, the true conchs.

== Description ==
The shell size varies between 70 mm and 165 mm.

== Distribution ==
The Bubonian conch occurs in the Eastern Atlantic Ocean off West Africa, Senegal, Gabon, Cape Verde, Ascension Island, and Angola.
