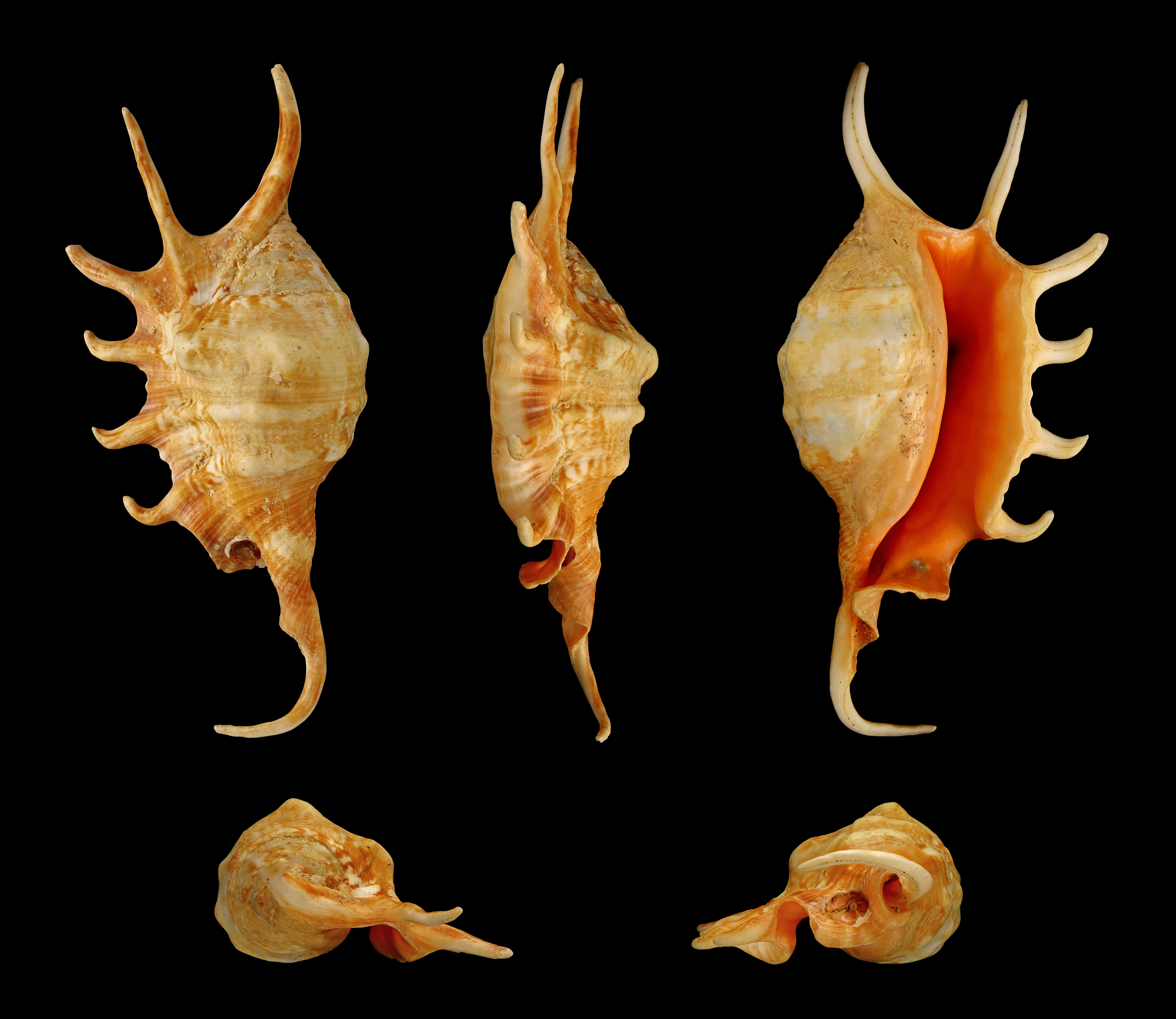
- Five views of a shell of Lambis crocata

Scientific classification
- Domain: Eukaryota
- Kingdom: Animalia
- Phylum: Mollusca
- Class: Gastropoda
- Subclass: Caenogastropoda
- Order: Littorinimorpha
- Superfamily: Stromboidea
- Family: Strombidae
- Genus: Lambis; Röding, 1798

Type species
- Strombus lambis Linnaeus, 1758

Synonyms
- Lambis (Lambis) Röding, 1798; Lambis (Millepes) Mörch, 1852; Millepes Mörch, 1852; Pterocera Lamarck, 1799 (junior objective synonym of Lambis); Pterocera (Heptadactylus) Mörch, 1852; Pterocera (Millepes) Mörch, 1852; Pteroceras as of Link, 1807 (incorrect subsequent spelling of Pterocera)

= Lambis =

Lambis Temporal range: Tertiary–Recent

Genus of gastropods

Lambis is a genus of large sea snails sometimes known as spider conchs, marine gastropod mollusks in the family Strombidae, the true conch family.

== Description ==
The siphonal canal is long and curved, and the apertural lip is adorned with circumapertural projections, which are fingerlike processes emanating from the edge of the shell aperture.

== Species ==
Species within the genus Lambis include:

- Lambis arachnoides Shikama, 1971
- Lambis crocata (Link, 1807)
- Lambis lambis (Linnaeus, 1758)
- Lambis lilikae Villar, 2016
- Lambis millepeda (Linnaeus, 1758)
- Lambis montorum T. Cossignani & Lorenz, 2020
- Lambis pilsbryi Abbott, 1961
- Lambis robusta (Swainson, 1821)
- Lambis scorpius (Linnaeus, 1758)
- Lambis truncata (Humphrey, 1786)

Species brought into synonymy

- Lambis adamii (Bozzetti & Cossignani, 2003) : synonym of Lambis lambis (Linnaeus, 1758)
- Lambis aratrum Röding, 1798: synonym of Euprotomus aratrum (Röding, 1798) (original combination)
- Lambis arthritica Röding, 1798 : synonym of Harpago arthriticus (Röding, 1798)
- Lambis aurantia (Lamarck, 1822) : synonym of Lambis crocata (Link, 1807)
- Lambis bryonia (Gmelin, 1791): synonym of Lambis truncata ([Lightfoot], 1786)
- Lambis bulla Röding, 1798: synonym of Euprotomus bulla (Röding, 1798) (original combination)
- Lambis carinata Röding, 1798: synonym of Margistrombus marginatus (Linnaeus, 1758)
- Lambis carnaria Röding, 1798: synonym of Persististrombus latus (Gmelin, 1791): synonym of Thetystrombus latus (Gmelin, 1791)
- Lambis carnea Röding, 1798: synonym of Persististrombus latus (Gmelin, 1791): synonym of Thetystrombus latus (Gmelin, 1791)
- Lambis cerea Röding, 1798: synonym of Lambis lambis (Linnaeus, 1758)
- Lambis chiragra (Linnaeus, 1758) : synonym of Harpago chiragra (Linnaeus, 1758)
- Lambis cristinae Bozzetti, 1999: synonym of Lambis scorpius indomaris Abbott, 1961 (hybrid of L. scorpius indomaris x L. lambis)
- Lambis curruca Röding, 1798: synonym of Tricornis tricornis ([Lightfoot], 1786)
- Lambis decora Röding, 1798: synonym of Conomurex decorus (Röding, 1798)
- Lambis digitata (Perry, G., 1811): synonym of Ophioglossolambis digitata (Perry, 1811)
- Lambis flammeus Link, 1807: synonym of Conomurex persicus (Swainson, 1821)
- Lambis fragilis Röding, 1798: synonym of Terestrombus fragilis (Röding, 1798) (original combination)
- Lambis gibbosa Röding, 1798: synonym of Gibberulus gibberulus gibbosus (Röding, 1798) (original combination)
- Lambis harpago Röding, 1798: synonym of Harpago chiragra (Linnaeus, 1758)
- Lambis hermaphrodita Röding, 1798: synonym of Lambis lambis (Linnaeus, 1758)
- Lambis indomaris Abbott, 1961: synonym of Lambis scorpius indomaris Abbott, 1961
- Lambis labiata Röding, 1798: synonym of Canarium labiatum (Röding, 1798) (original combination)
- Lambis laciniata Röding, 1798: synonym of Lambis lambis (Linnaeus, 1758)
- Lambis lamboides Röding, 1798: synonym of Lambis lambis (Linnaeus, 1758)
- Lambis lobata Röding, 1798: synonym of Lambis lambis (Linnaeus, 1758)
- Lambis lobata Röding, 1798 (: 65): synonym of Sinustrombus sinuatus ([Lightfoot], 1786)
- Lambis maculata Röding, 1798: synonym of Lambis lambis (Linnaeus, 1758)
- Lambis picta Röding, 1798: synonym of Sinustrombus latissimus (Linnaeus, 1758)
- Lambis pipa Röding, 1798: synonym of Lentigo pipus (Röding, 1798) (original combination)
- Lambis plicata Röding, 1798: synonym of Dolomena plicata (Röding, 1798) (original combination)
- Lambis rana Röding, 1798: synonym of Lentigo lentiginosus (Linnaeus, 1758)
- Lambis reticulata Link, 1807: synonym of Canarium labiatum (Röding, 1798) (uncertain synonym)
- Lambis rugosa (G. B. Sowerby II, 1842): synonym of Harpago chiragra rugosus (G. B. Sowerby II, 1842)
- Lambis sebae (Kiener, 1843): synonym of Lambis truncata sebae (Kiener, 1843)
- Lambis sowerbyi (Mörch, 1872): synonym of Lambis truncata sowerbyi (Mörch, 1872)
- Lambis turturella Röding, 1798: synonym of Laevistrombus turturella (Röding, 1798) (original combination)
- Lambis undulata Röding, 1798: synonym of Harpago chiragra (Linnaeus, 1758)
- Lambis velum Röding, 1798: synonym of Lobatus gallus (Linnaeus, 1758): synonym of Aliger gallus (Linnaeus, 1758)
- Lambis violacea (Swainson, 1821): synonym of Ophioglossolambis violacea (Swainson, 1821)
- Lambis vomer Röding, 1798: synonym of Euprotomus vomer (Röding, 1798) (original combination)
- Lambis wheelwhrighti Greene, 1978: synonym of Lambis arachnoides Shikama, 1971
