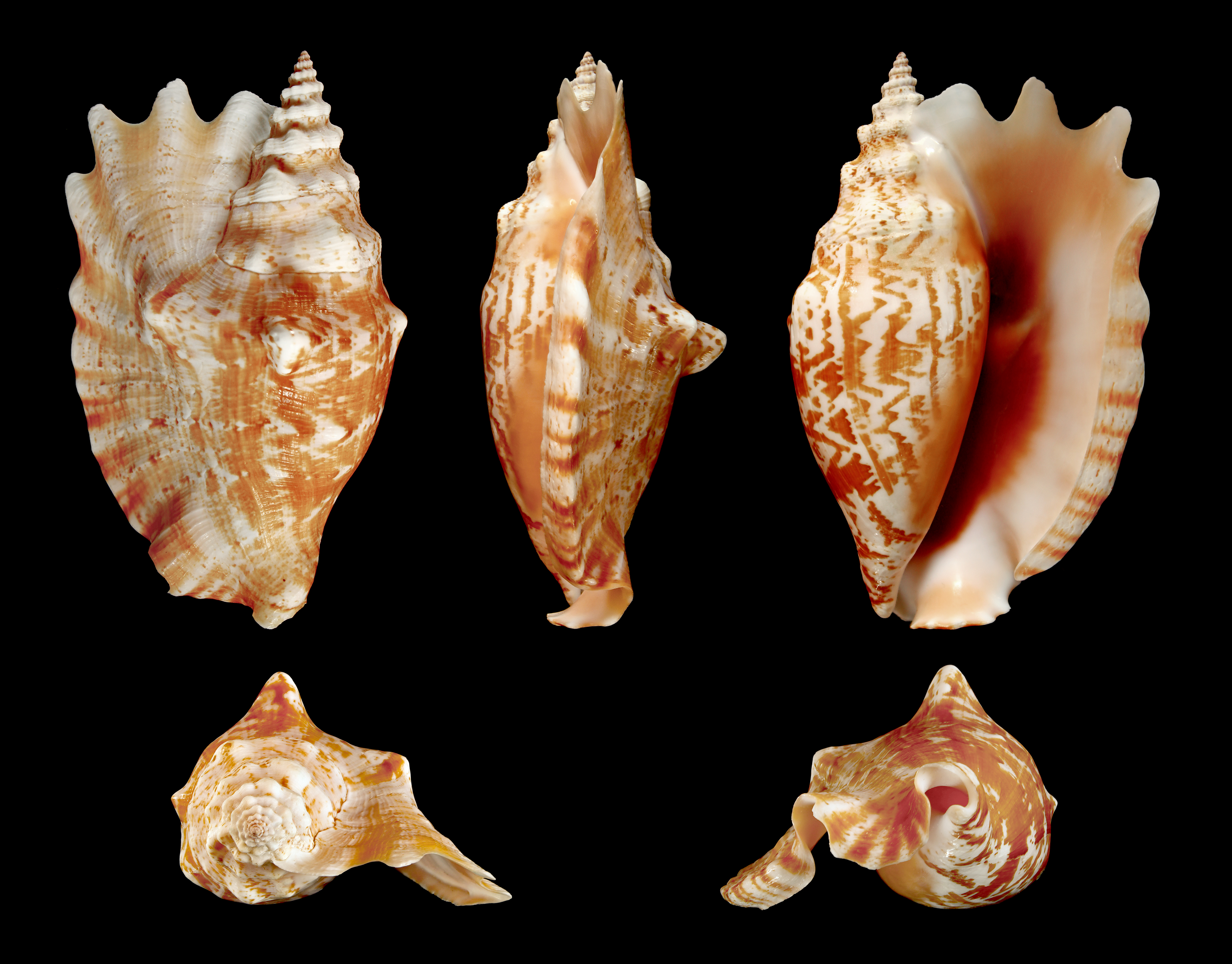

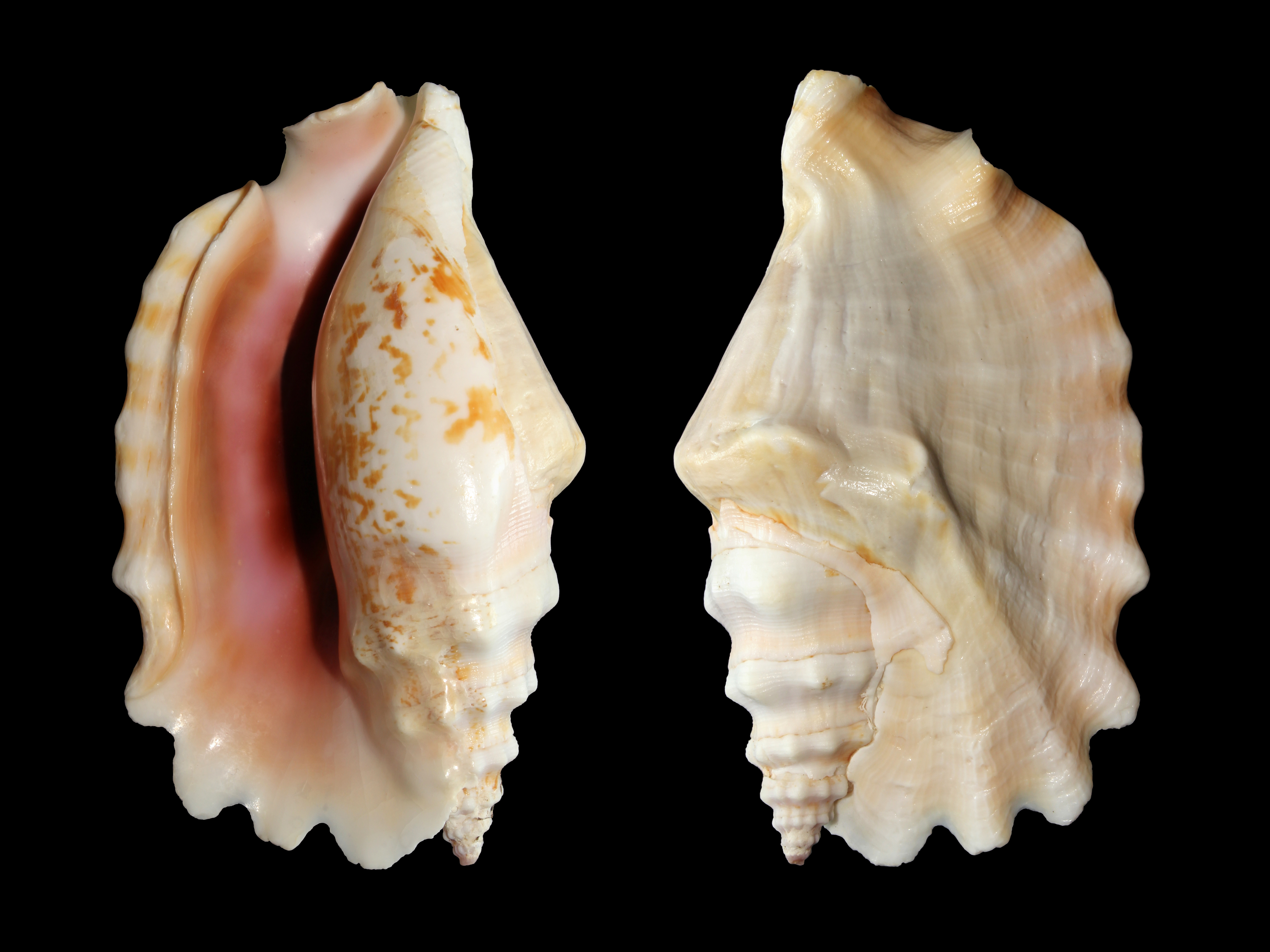
- Views of laciniate conch shells

Scientific classification
- Kingdom: Animalia
- Phylum: Mollusca
- Class: Gastropoda
- Subclass: Caenogastropoda
- Order: Littorinimorpha
- Superfamily: Stromboidea
- Family: Strombidae
- Genus: Sinustrombus
- Species: S. sinuatus

Binomial name
- Sinustrombus sinuatus (Humphrey, 1786)

Synonyms
- Lambis lobata Röding, 1798 (: 65); Pterocera palmata Fischer von Waldheim, 1807; Strombus cristatus Lamarck, 1822; Strombus laciniatus Dillwyn, 1817; Strombus sinuatus Humphrey, 1786 (basionym)

= Sinustrombus sinuatus =

Species of sea snail

Sinustrombus sinuatus, common name the laciniate conch, is a species of sea snail, a marine gastropod mollusc in the true conch family, Strombidae. It is native to the tropical Indo-Pacific region.

== Description ==
The shell of S. sinuatus is thick and solid with a large body whorl. The maximum length is 13 cm (5 in), but a more common size is 10 cm (4 in). The short spire consists of about twelve whorls; the exterior of the shell is white, blotched or spotted with yellow, orange or light tan, and the interior is brown, purple or pink. It is rather varied in morphology, with the lip of the aperture having a number of blunt finger-like processes, which vary from being almost unnoticeable to being prominent. The difference in shape of these variations is larger than the difference between the shape of this mollusc and the related species Lambis millepeda, Lambis scorpius and Lambis lambis, which it resembles.

== Distribution and habitat ==
Sinustrombus sinuatus is found in tropical and sub-tropical waters in southeastern Asia and Oceania. Its range extends from Sri Lanka and the eastern coast of India to the Philippines, Japan, Taiwan, Indonesia, Melanesia, Papua New Guinea and northern Australia. Its typical habitat is a sandy substrate with algae and coral fragments in areas with low turbidity. It occurs from the low intertidal zone down to about 20 m (66 ft).

== Ecology ==
In the nineteenth century there was a widespread belief that members of the family Strombidiae were carnivorous but this proved to be false. S. sinuatus inhabits soft substrates where it feeds on fragments of algae, ingesting sand and detritus, and deriving its nutrition from the decomposing organic material. It is an active mollusc, able to use its slender foot and robust operculum to flip itself off the seabed, in locomotion or defence. Its operculum and the finger-like processes on the lip of the shell are also used in the behaviour involved in shell-righting.
