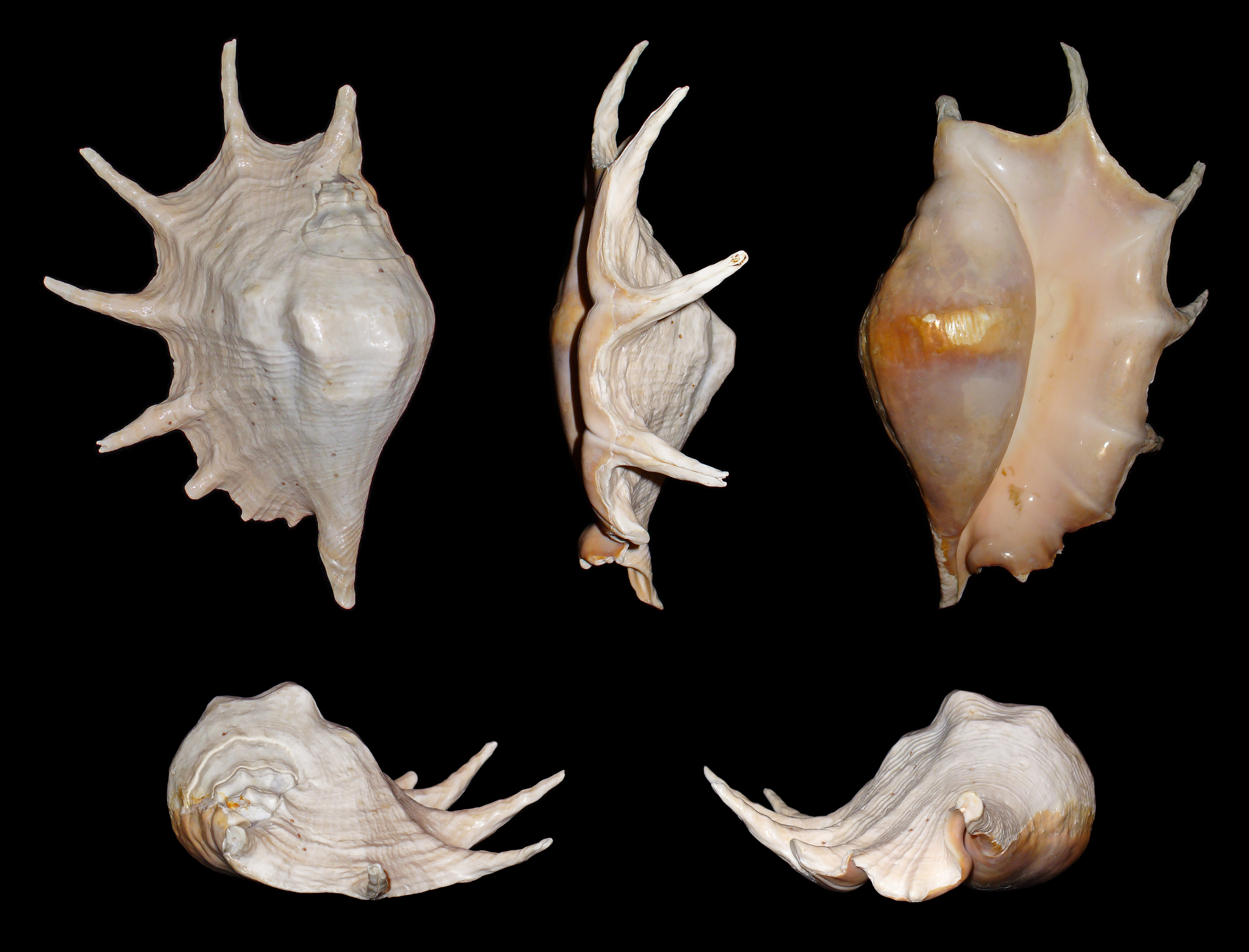
- Five views of a shell of Lambis truncata
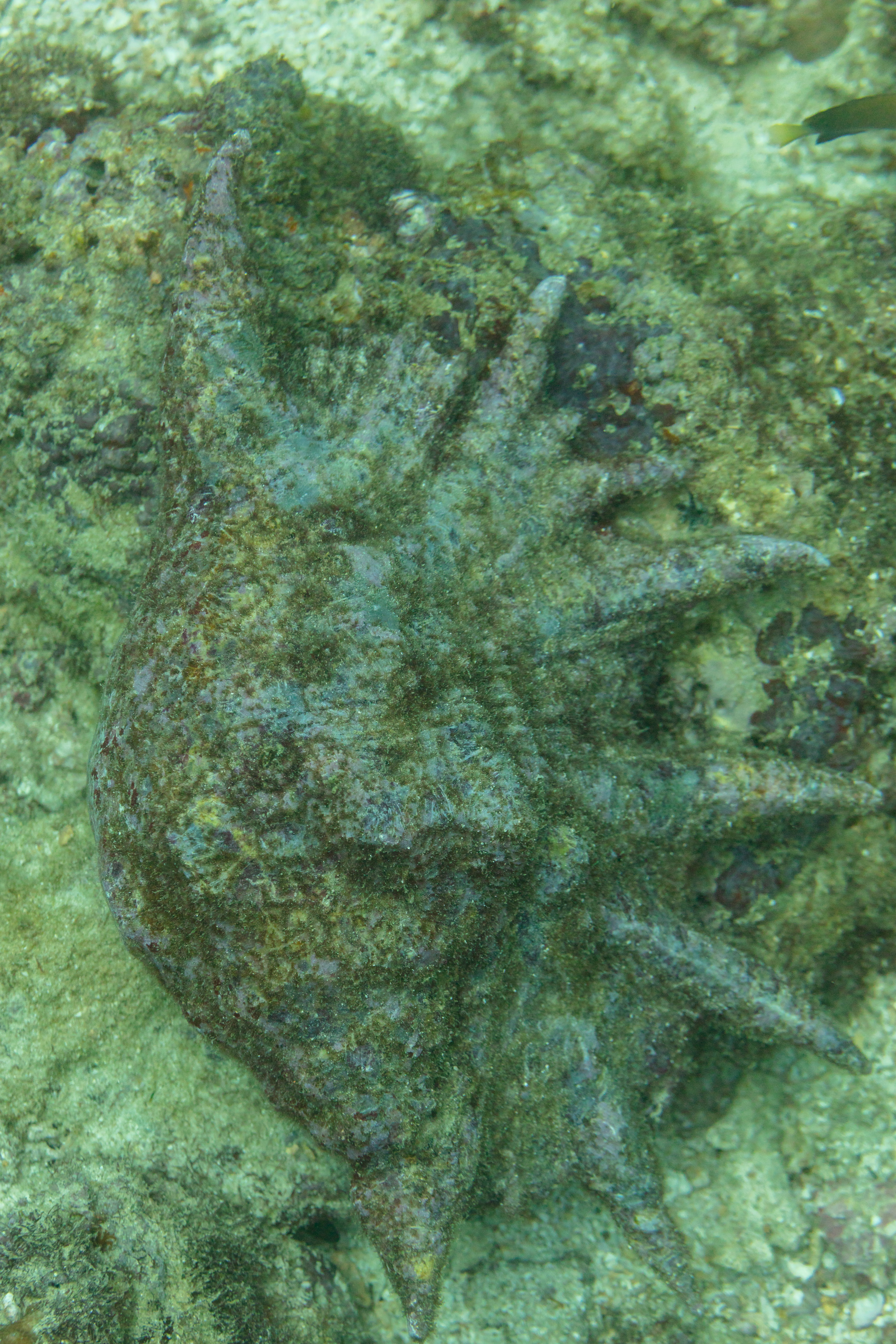
- Lambis truncata in Ad Dimaniyat Islands, Oman

Scientific classification
- Kingdom: Animalia
- Phylum: Mollusca
- Class: Gastropoda
- Subclass: Caenogastropoda
- Order: Littorinimorpha
- Family: Strombidae
- Genus: Lambis
- Species: L. truncata

Binomial name
- Lambis truncata (Humphrey, 1786)

Synonyms
- Lambis bryonia Gmelin, 1791; Pterocera bryonia (Gmelin, 1791); Strombus truncatus Lightfoot, 1786 (basionym)

= Lambis truncata =

Species of gastropod

Lambis truncata, common name the giant spider conch, is a species of sea snail, a marine gastropod mollusc in the family Strombidae, the true conchs.

== Subspecies ==
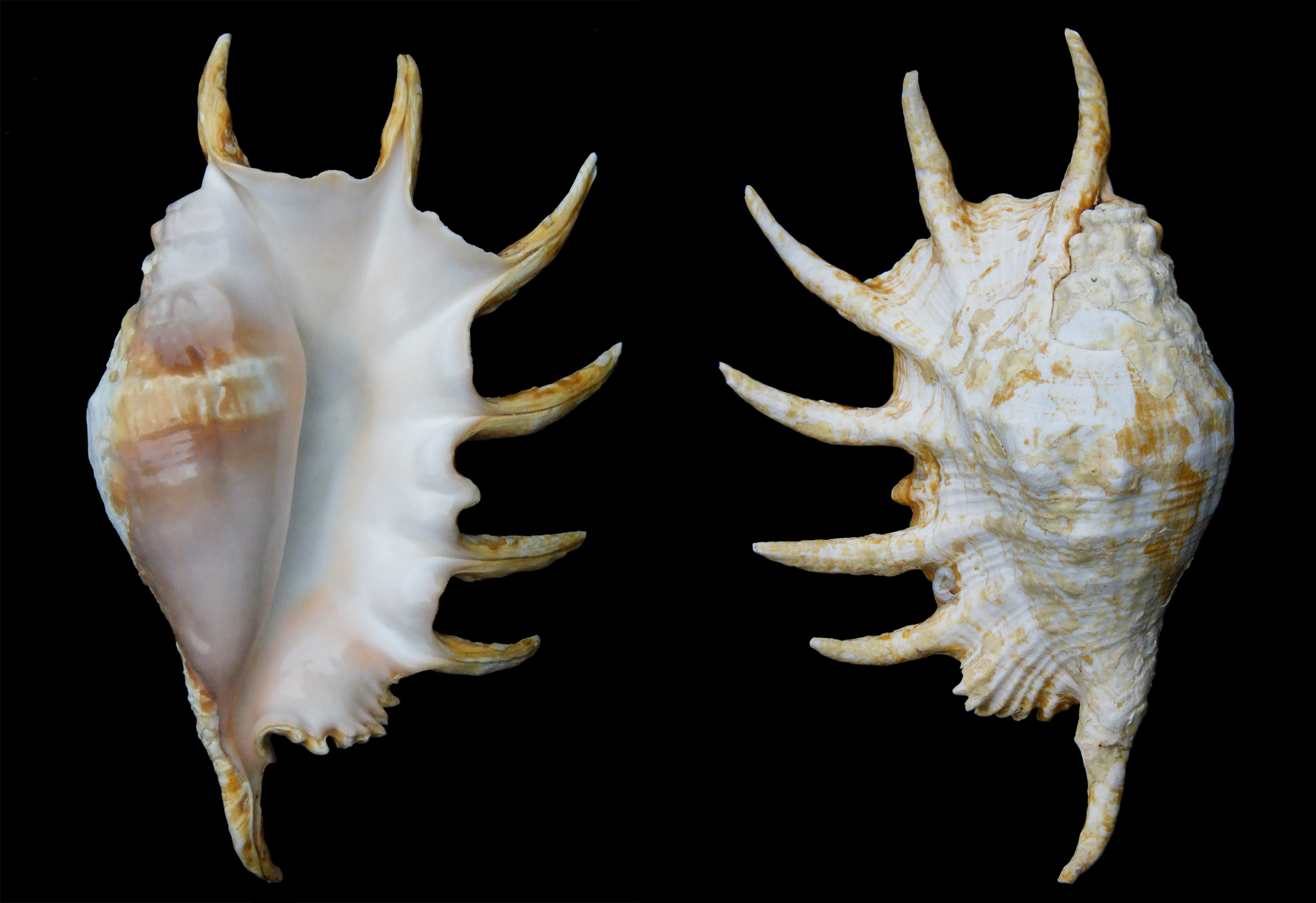
A shell of Lambis truncata truncata

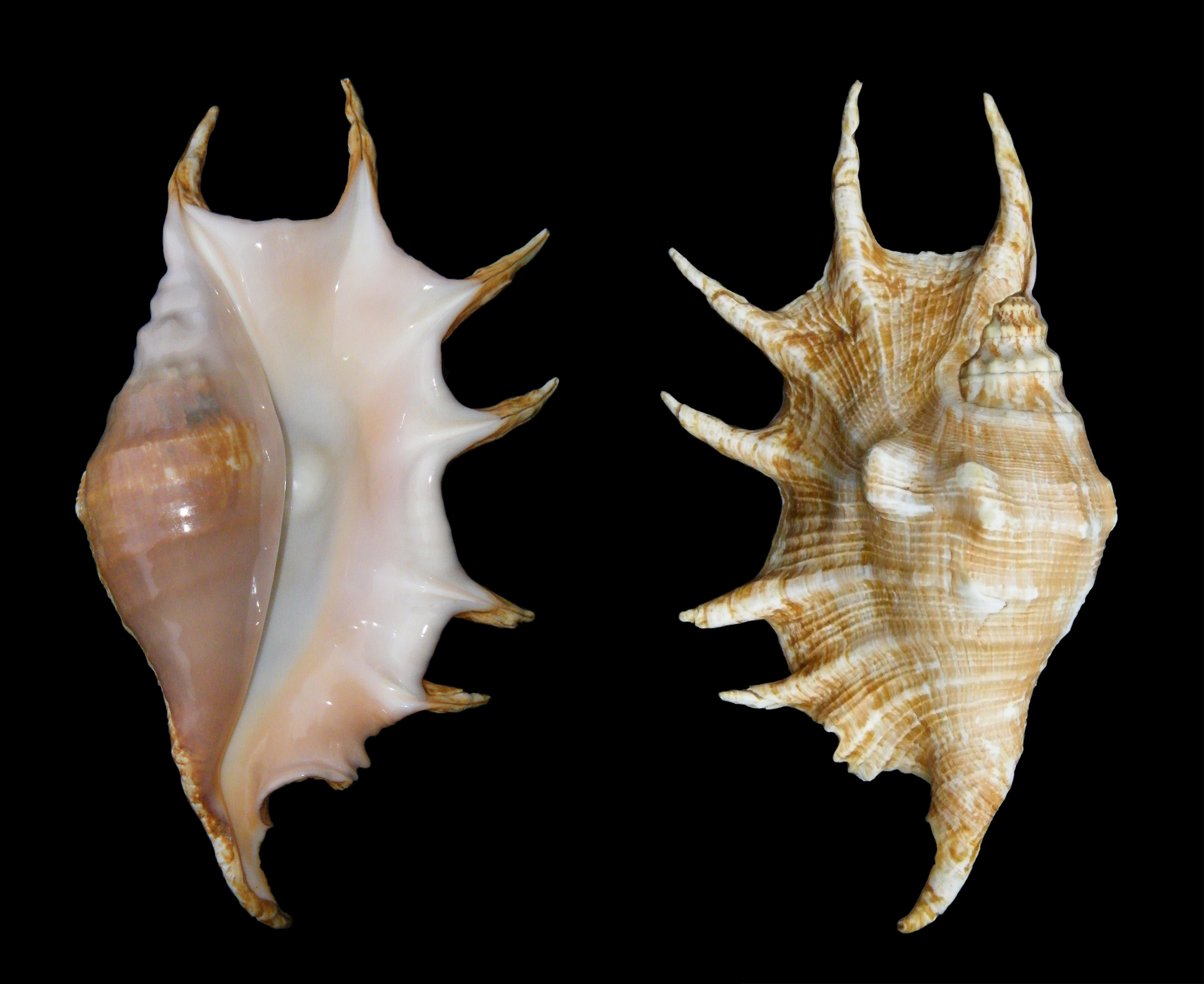
A shell of Lambis truncata sebae

Subspecies of Lambis truncata include:

- Lambis truncata truncata (Humphrey, 1786)
- Lambis truncata sebae (Kiener, 1843)

Lambis truncata truncata has a flat apex, while the apex of Lambis truncata sebae is more pointed.

== Description ==
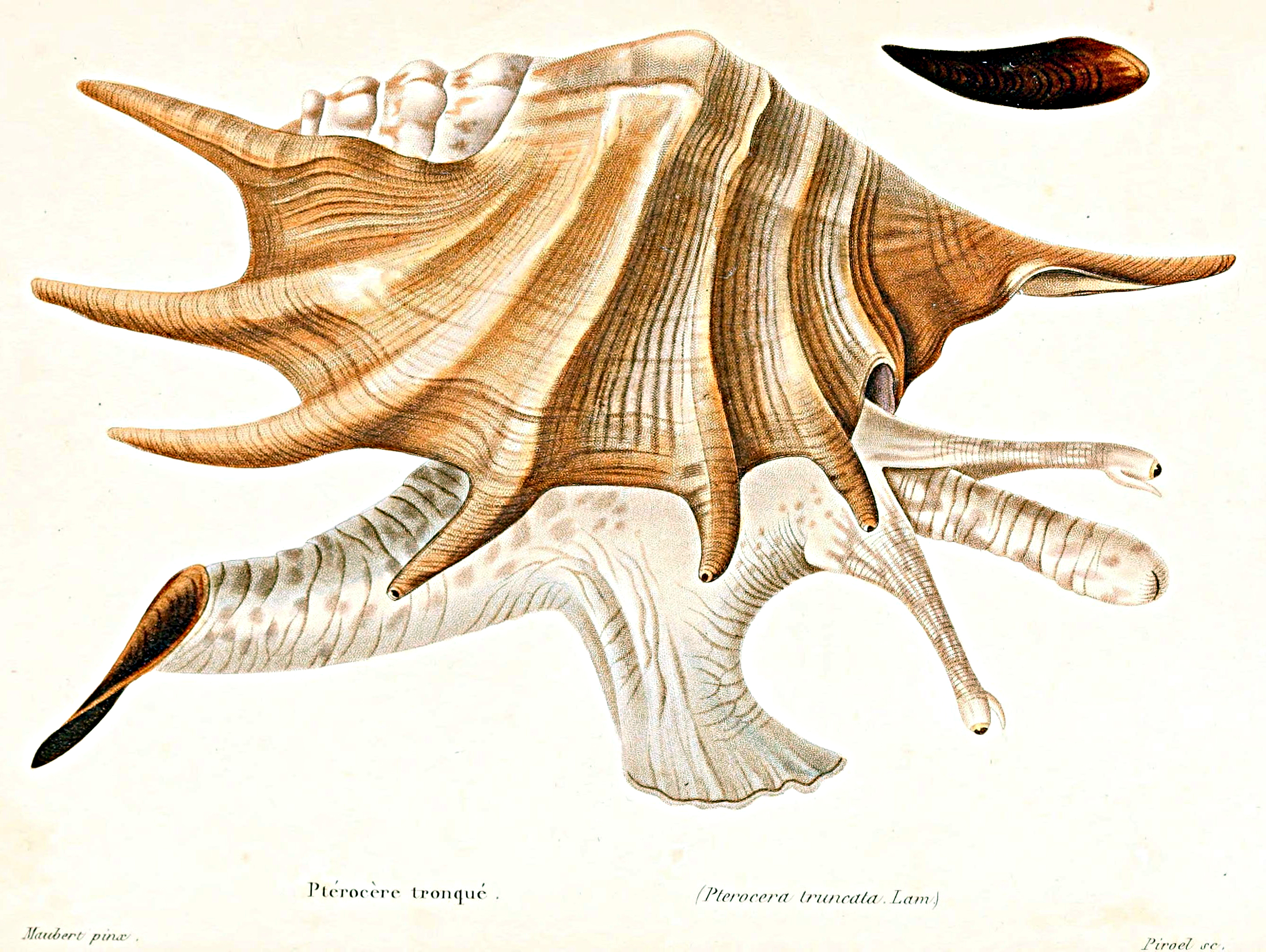
A colored drawing of Lambis truncata from Kiener, 1843, depicting both the shell and soft parts

Lambis truncata is the largest and heaviest of spider shells, up to 40 cm. Lambis truncata is similar to Lambis lambis but with a more squarish outline. Younger shells are creamy white; columella and lip usually mauve brown when older.

== Distribution ==
The distribution of Lambis truncata includes the Indian Ocean off Aldabra, Chagos, Madagascar, Mauritius, Tanzania; the Bay of Bengal and in the Pacific Ocean along the Philippines.

== Ecology ==
Lambis truncata lives on rubble and coarse sand in shallow water.
