= Lambis scorpius indomaris =

Scientific classification
- Kingdom: Animalia
- Phylum: Mollusca
- Class: Gastropoda
- Subclass: Caenogastropoda
- Order: Littorinimorpha
- Family: Strombidae
- Genus: Lambis
- Species: L. scorpius
- Subspecies: L. s. indomaris

Trinomial name
- Lambis scorpius indomaris Abbott, 1961

Synonyms
- Lambis cristinae Bozzetti, 1999 (hybrid of L. scorpius indomaris x L. lambis); Lambis indomaris Abbott, 1961; Strombus sinuatus Perry, 1811 (Invalid: junior homonym of Strombus sinuatus [Lightfoot], 1786)

Subspecies of gastropod

Lambis scorpius indomaris is a subspecies of sea snail, a marine gastropod mollusc in the family Strombidae, the true conchs.

== Distribution ==
This marine species occurs off Madagascar.
