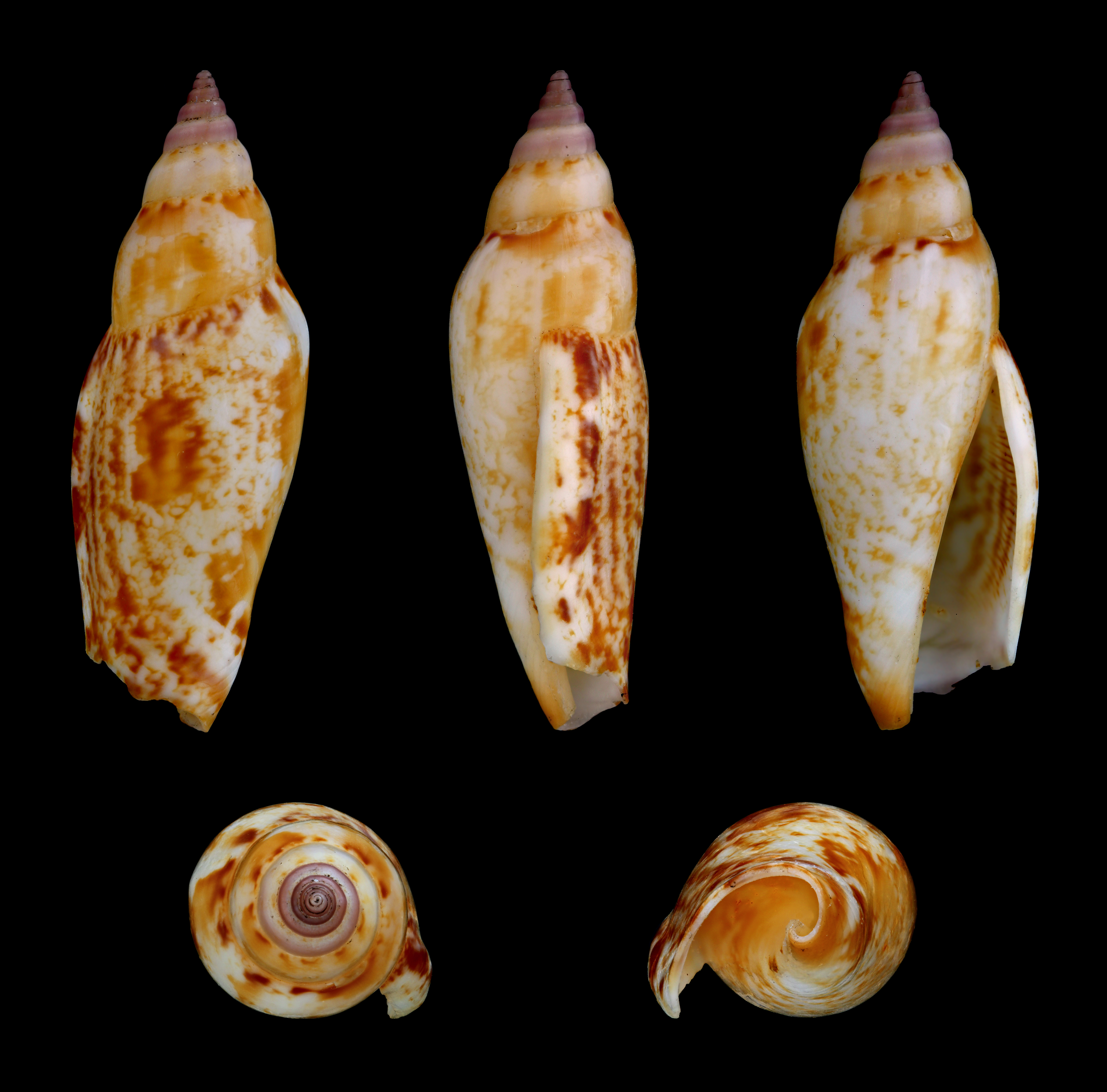
- Five views of a shell of Terestrombus terebellatus

Scientific classification
- Kingdom: Animalia
- Phylum: Mollusca
- Class: Gastropoda
- Subclass: Caenogastropoda
- Order: Littorinimorpha
- Superfamily: Stromboidea
- Family: Strombidae
- Genus: Terestrombus; Kronenberg & Vermeij, 2002

Type species
- Lambis fragilis Röding, 1798

= Terestrombus =

Genus of gastropods

Terestrombus is a genus of sea snails, marine gastropod mollusks in the family Strombidae, the true conchs.

== Species ==
Species within the genus Terestrombus include:

- Terestrombus afrobellatus (Abbott, 1960)
- Terestrombus fragilis (Röding, 1798)
- Terestrombus terebellatus (Sowerby II, 1842)
