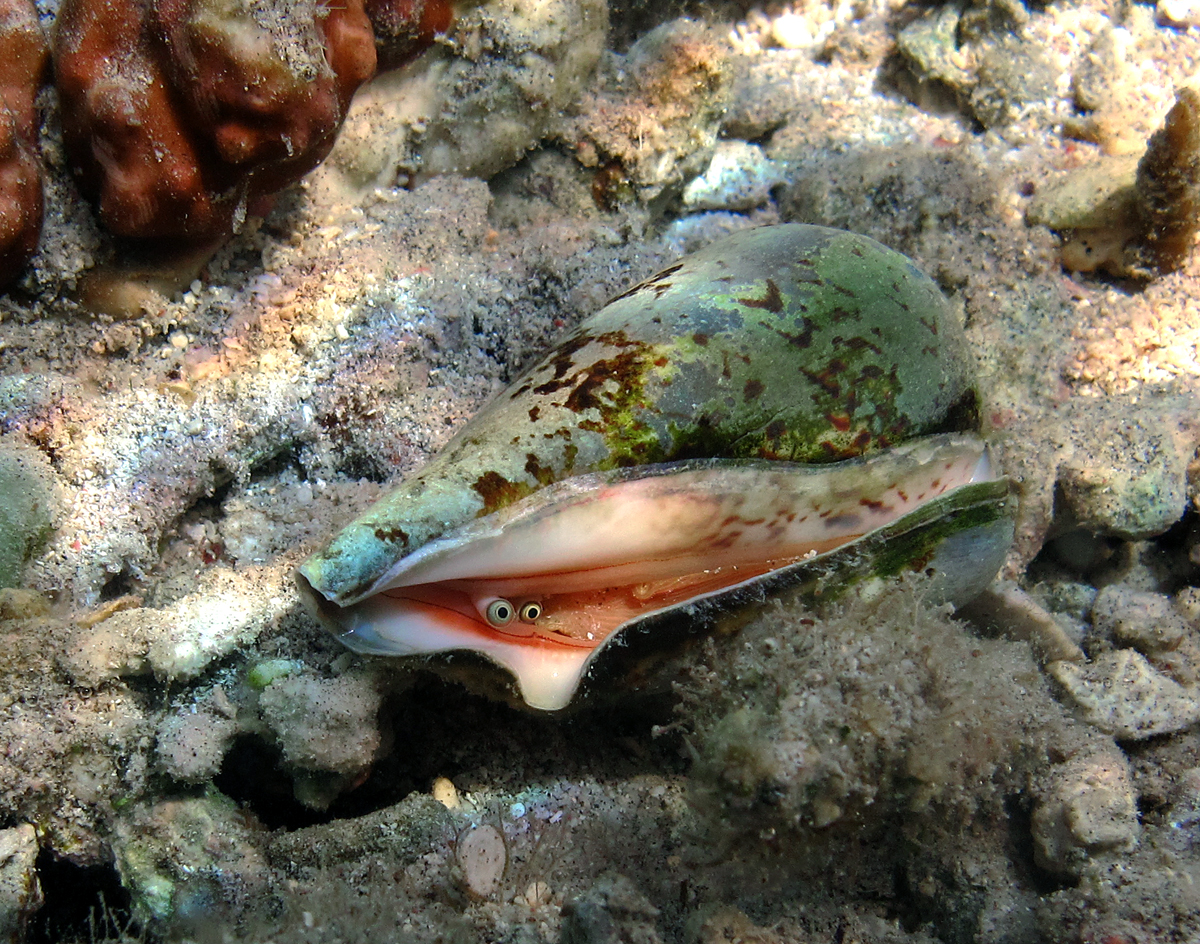
- Conomurex decorus (Réunion island)

Scientific classification
- Kingdom: Animalia
- Phylum: Mollusca
- Class: Gastropoda
- Subclass: Caenogastropoda
- Order: Littorinimorpha
- Superfamily: Stromboidea
- Family: Strombidae
- Genus: Conomurex; Schumacher, 1817

Type species
- Conomurex luhuanus Linnaeus, 1758

Synonyms
- Decostrombus Bandel, 2007; Strombus (Conomurex) Bayle in Fischer, 1884

= Conomurex =

Genus of gastropods

Conomurex is a genus of sea snails, marine gastropod mollusks in the family Strombidae, the true conchs.

== Species ==
Species within the genus Conomurex include:

- Conomurex coniformis (Sowerby II, 1842)
- Conomurex decorus (Röding, 1798)
- Conomurex fasciatus (Born, 1778)
- Conomurex luhuanus (Linnaeus, 1758)
- Conomurex persicus (Swainson, 1821)
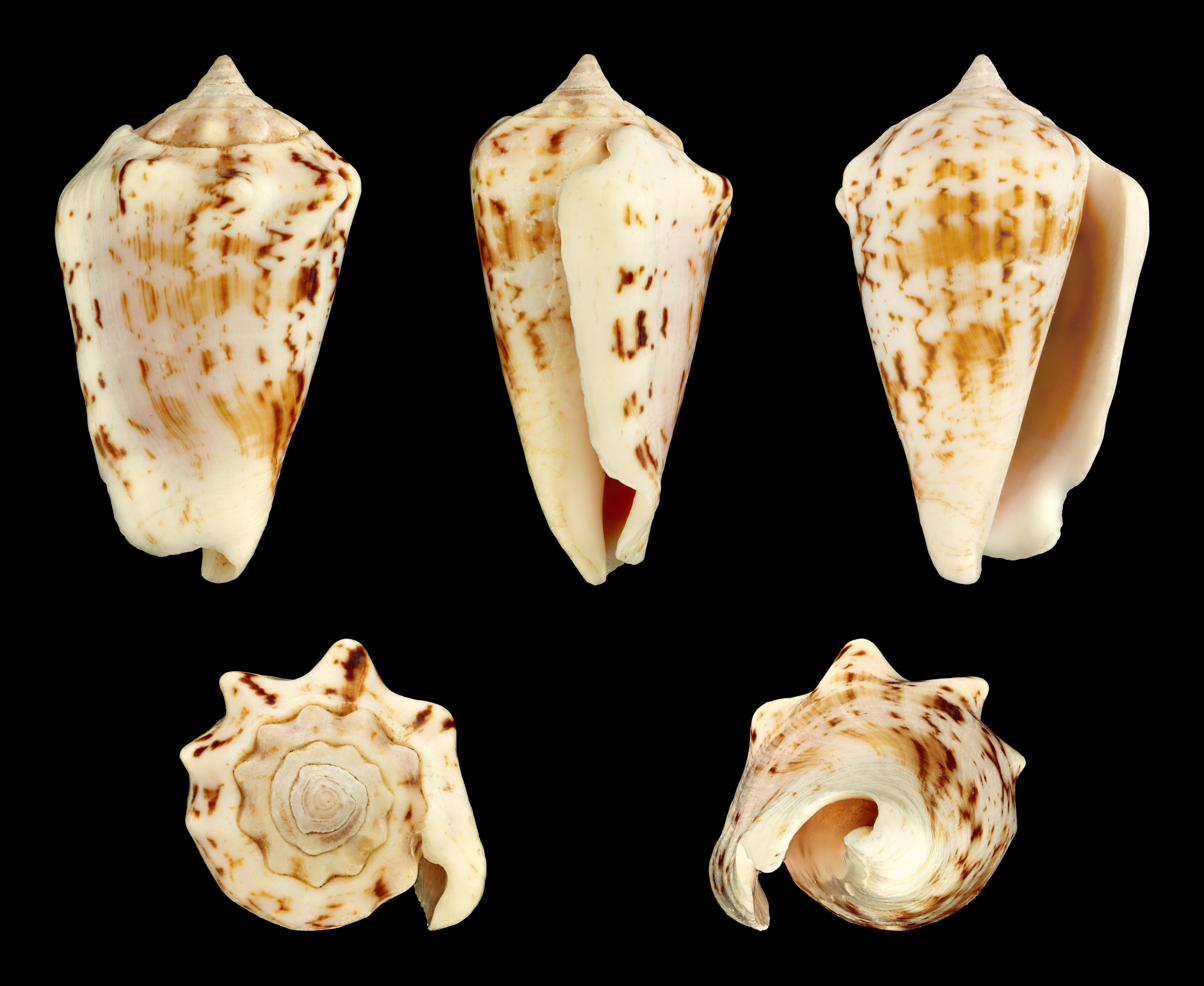
Five views of a shell of Conomurex decorus

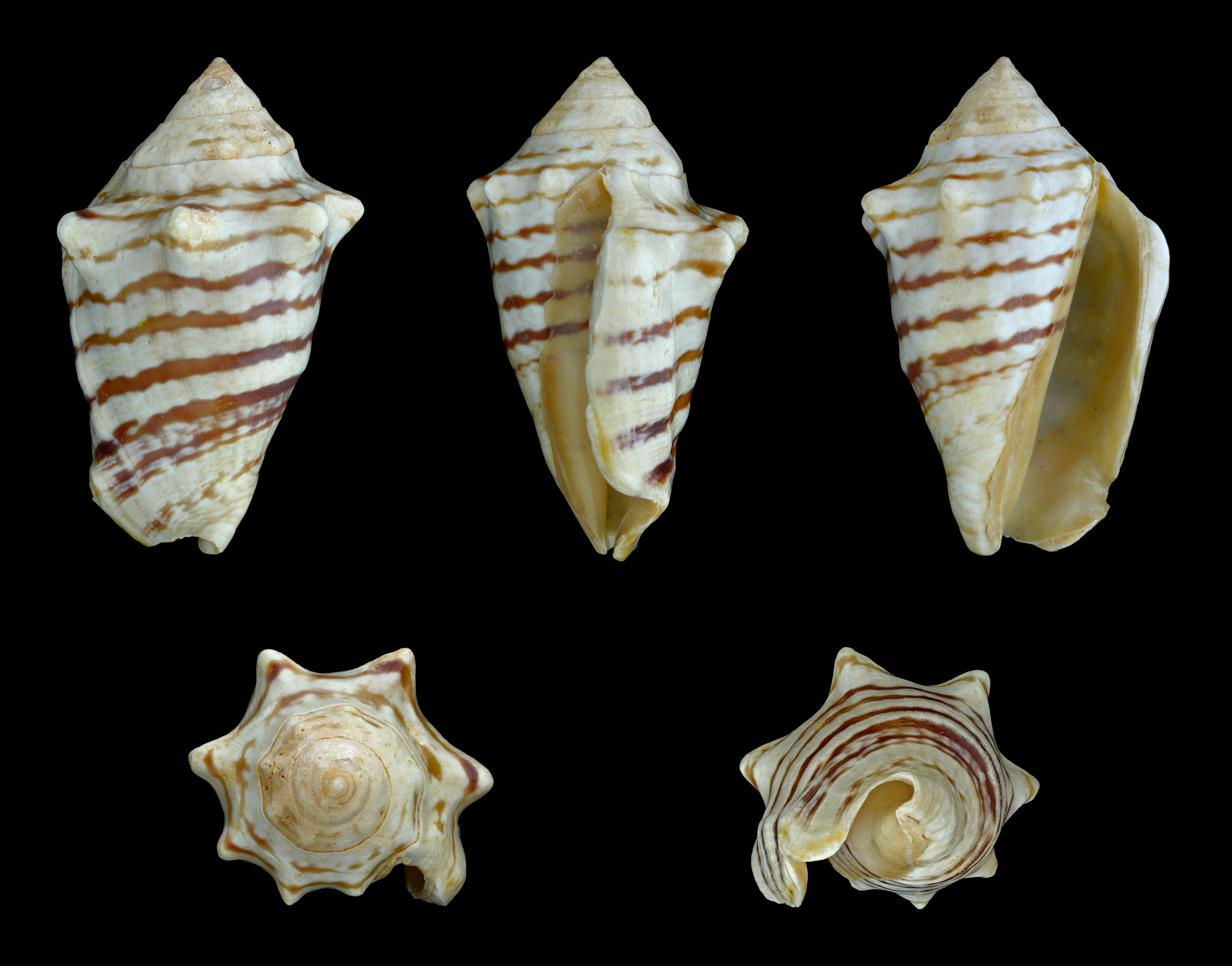
Conomurex fasciatus

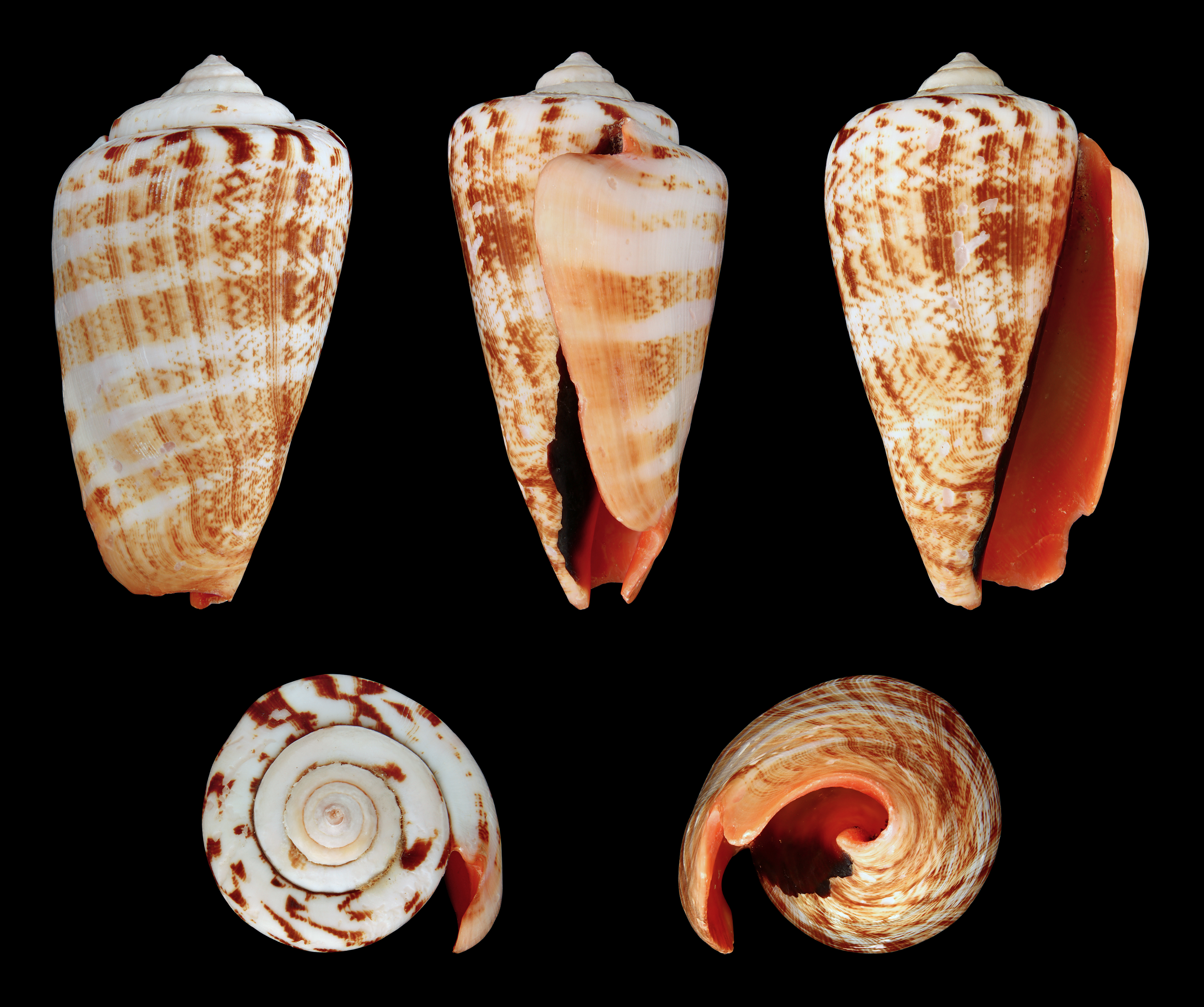
Conomurex luhuanus ("strawberry conch")

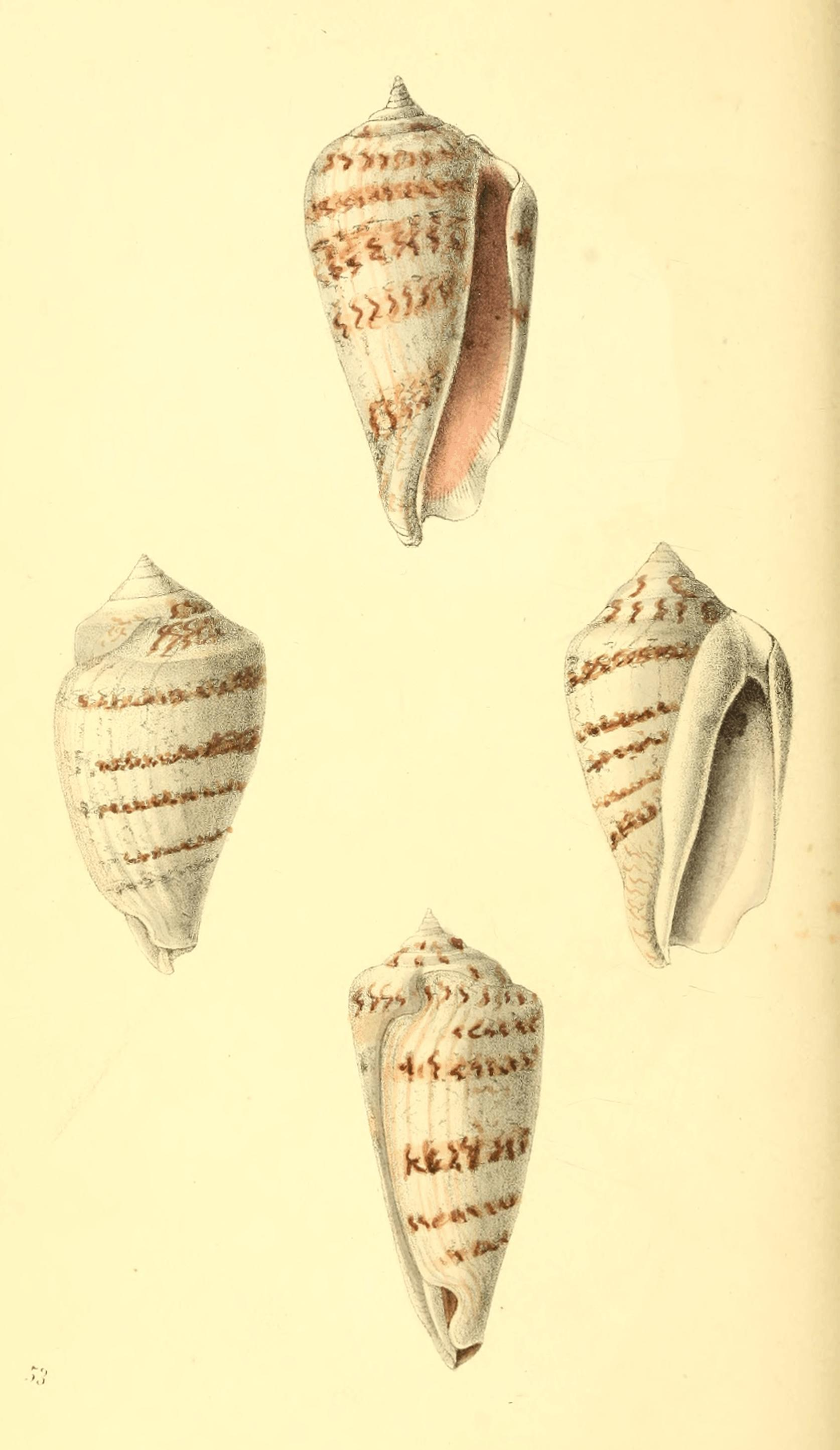
Conomurex persicus
