= Henry Heuland =

English mineralogist

John Henry Heuland (21 March 1778 – 16 November 1856) was a German born (Johann Heinrich) English mineralogist and dealer. He was a Fellow of the Geological Society of London. His collection is held by the Natural History Museum, London. In 1804 he purchased mineral specimens in Lisbon. He subsequently travelled through France, Germany, Sweden, and Russia, collecting and buying minerals. About the year 1806 he acquired minerals collected in Europe between the years 1766 and 1806 by his uncle Adolarius Jacob Forster whose London dealership later became Heuland's. Armand Lévy categorised his mineral collection.

The mineral Heulandite is named for him. He played a dubious role in the discovery of Palladium.
