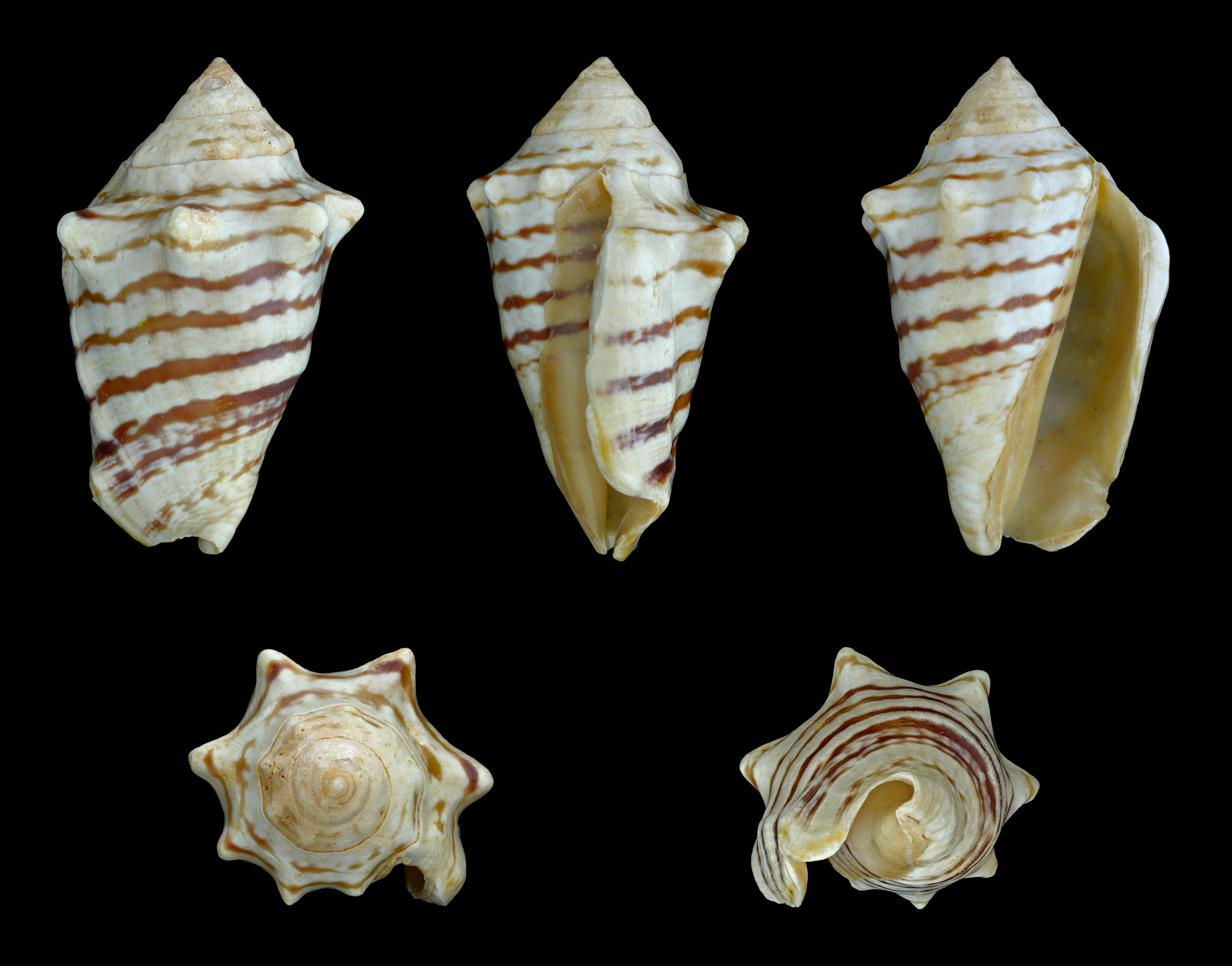
- Five views of a shell of Conomurex fasciatus

Scientific classification
- Kingdom: Animalia
- Phylum: Mollusca
- Class: Gastropoda
- Subclass: Caenogastropoda
- Order: Littorinimorpha
- Superfamily: Stromboidea
- Family: Strombidae
- Genus: Conomurex
- Species: C. fasciatus

Binomial name
- Conomurex fasciatus (Born, 1778)

Synonyms
- Strombus dehelensis Ostini & Rigoletto, 1983; Strombus fasciatus Born, 1778 (basionym)

= Conomurex fasciatus =

Species of gastropod

Conomurex fasciatus, common name the lined conch, is a species of sea snail, a marine gastropod mollusk in the family Strombidae, the true conchs.

== Description ==
The shell size varies between 25 mm and 50 mm.

It has a white base color and lines passing vertically on its body. The colors can range from different shades of brown to solid black. The crown and upper part is drill shaped.

== Subspecies ==
Conomurex fasciatus dehelensis (var.) - Ostini & Rigoletti, 1983

Conomurex fasciatus elegans (var.) - Romagna-Manoja, E., 1973

Both subspecies occurs in the Red Sea.

== Distribution ==
This species occurs in the Red Sea and the Persian Gulf.
