= Jacob Forster =

Adolarius Jacob Forster (1739–1806) was a Prussian mineralogist and dealer in display specimen minerals. The Forster family left Yorkshire in 1649 and settled in Prussia. Adolarius Jacob Forster began dealing in mineral specimens around 1766, at the age of 27. He continued in that profession for 40 years and travelled widely. He had premises in London, Paris and St. Petersburg. The Covent Garden, London shop and one in Soho was run by his wife. His brother, Ingham Henry Forster (1725–1782) ran the business in Paris. Auction catalogues for sales in Paris were written by Romé de l'Isle.

He was related to Johann Georg Adam Forster and Johann Reinhold Forster and his sister married the London dealer naturalist George Humphrey at St-Martin-in-the-Fields, London on August 16, 1768. In 1802 Forster sold a collection to the museum of the St Petersburg Mining Institute, under the auspices of the Emperor of All Russia Alexander I. He spent the last ten years of his life in Russia, and died in St. Petersburg in 1806. The dealership was taken over by his nephew John Henry Heuland.

The mineral Forsterite is named for him.
