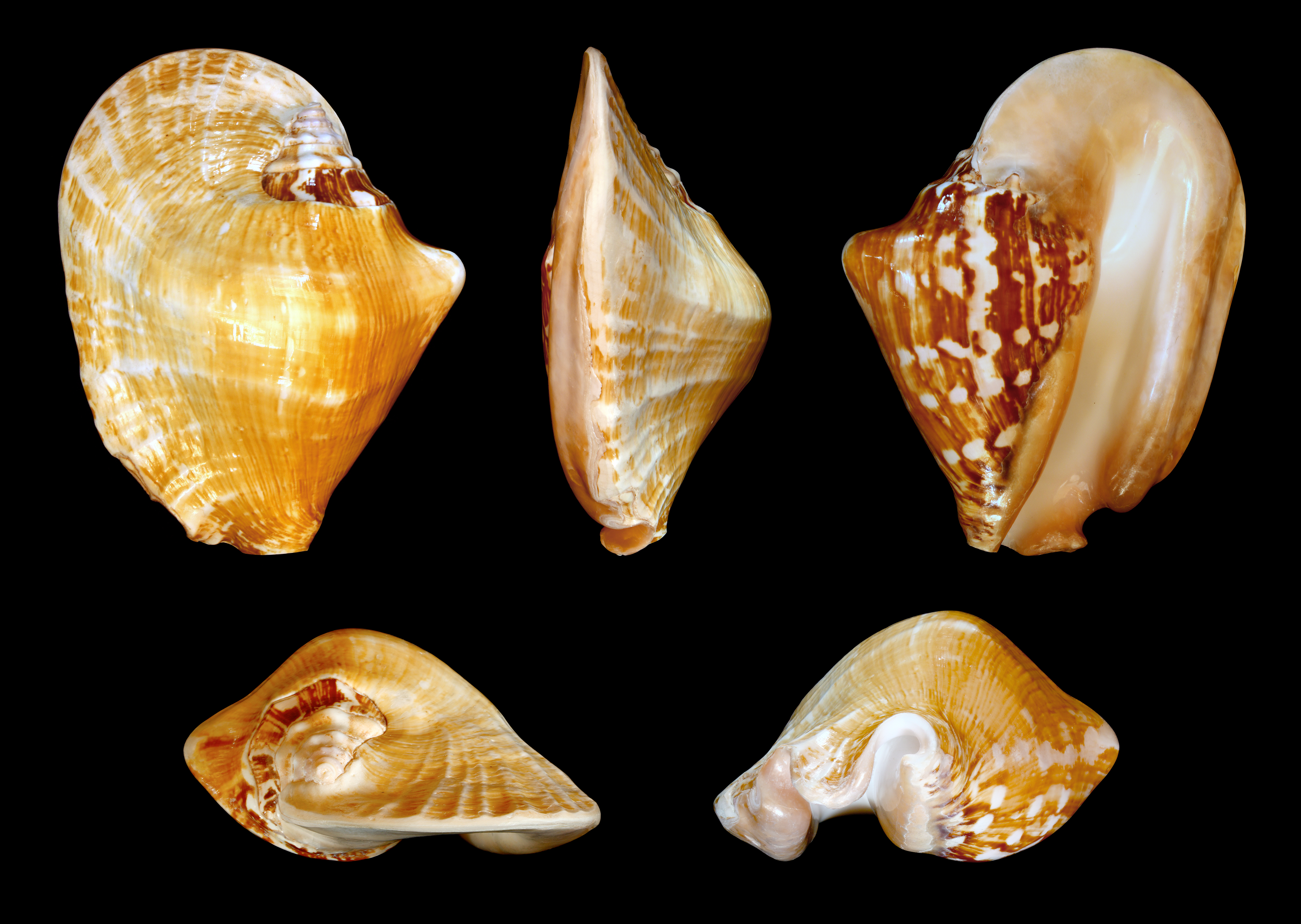
- Five views of a shell of Sinustrombus latissimus

Scientific classification
- Kingdom: Animalia
- Phylum: Mollusca
- Class: Gastropoda
- Subclass: Caenogastropoda
- Order: Littorinimorpha
- Superfamily: Stromboidea
- Family: Strombidae
- Genus: Sinustrombus; Bandel, 2007

Type species
- Strombus taurus Reeve, 1857

Synonyms
- Latissistrombus Bandel, 2007; Solidistrombus Dekkers, 2008

= Sinustrombus =

Genus of gastropods

Sinustrombus is a genus of sea snails, marine gastropod mollusks in the family Strombidae, the true conchs.

== Species ==
Species within the genus Sinustrombus include:

- S. latissimus (Linnaeus, 1758)
- S. sinuatus (Lightfoot, 1786)
- S. taurus (Reeve, 1857)
