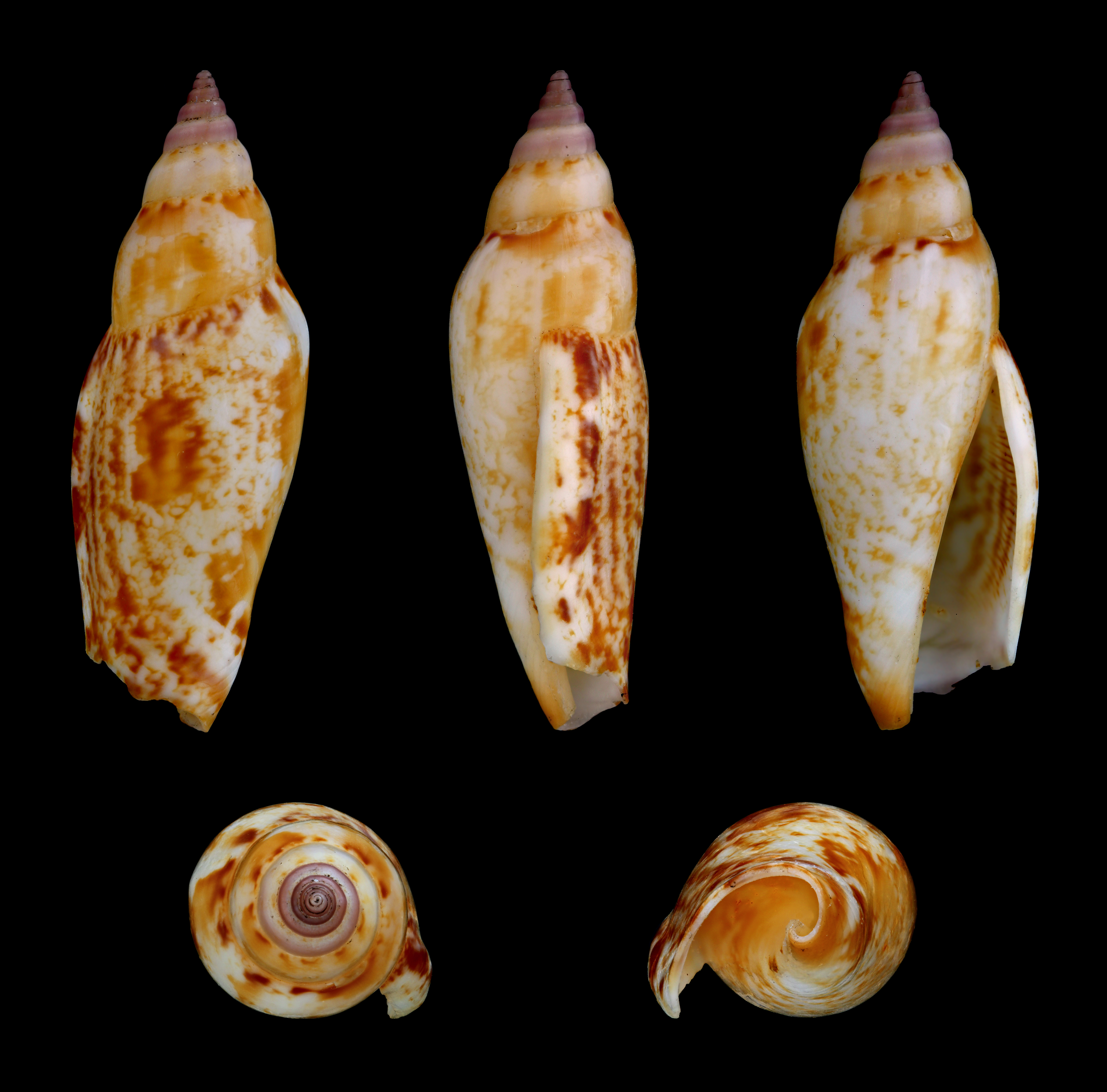
- Five views of a shell of Terestrombus terebellatus

Scientific classification
- Kingdom: Animalia
- Phylum: Mollusca
- Class: Gastropoda
- Subclass: Caenogastropoda
- Order: Littorinimorpha
- Family: Strombidae
- Genus: Terestrombus
- Species: T. terebellatus

Binomial name
- Terestrombus terebellatus (Sowerby II, 1842)

Synonyms
- Strombus terebellatus Sowerby II, 1842; Strombus terebellatus terebellatus Sowerby II, 1842

= Terestrombus terebellatus =

Species of gastropod

Terestrombus terebellatus, common name : the little auger conch, is a species of sea snail, a marine gastropod mollusk in the family Strombidae, the true conchs.

== Description ==
Adult shell size in this species varies between 25 mm and 54 mm. Strombus terebellatus (Strombus terebellatus) is a member of the Gastropod family Strombus in the Mollusc phylum. This kind of snail has unique morphological characteristics and living habits. Its shell is thin and smooth, and the shape of the pen cap is light brown and mixed with small brown spots, with excellent light transmission. The spiral layer has about 4 layers, the sutures are shallow, the body spiral layer grows rapidly in height, and has a color band composed of brown spots. The shell mouth is narrow and long, wedge-shaped, the outer lip edge is rolled inward, and the inner lip is close to the shell axis.

== Distribution ==
This species is distributed in the Red Sea, the Indian Ocean along the Chagos Atoll, in the Pacific Ocean along Japan, Fiji and Northwest Australia.
