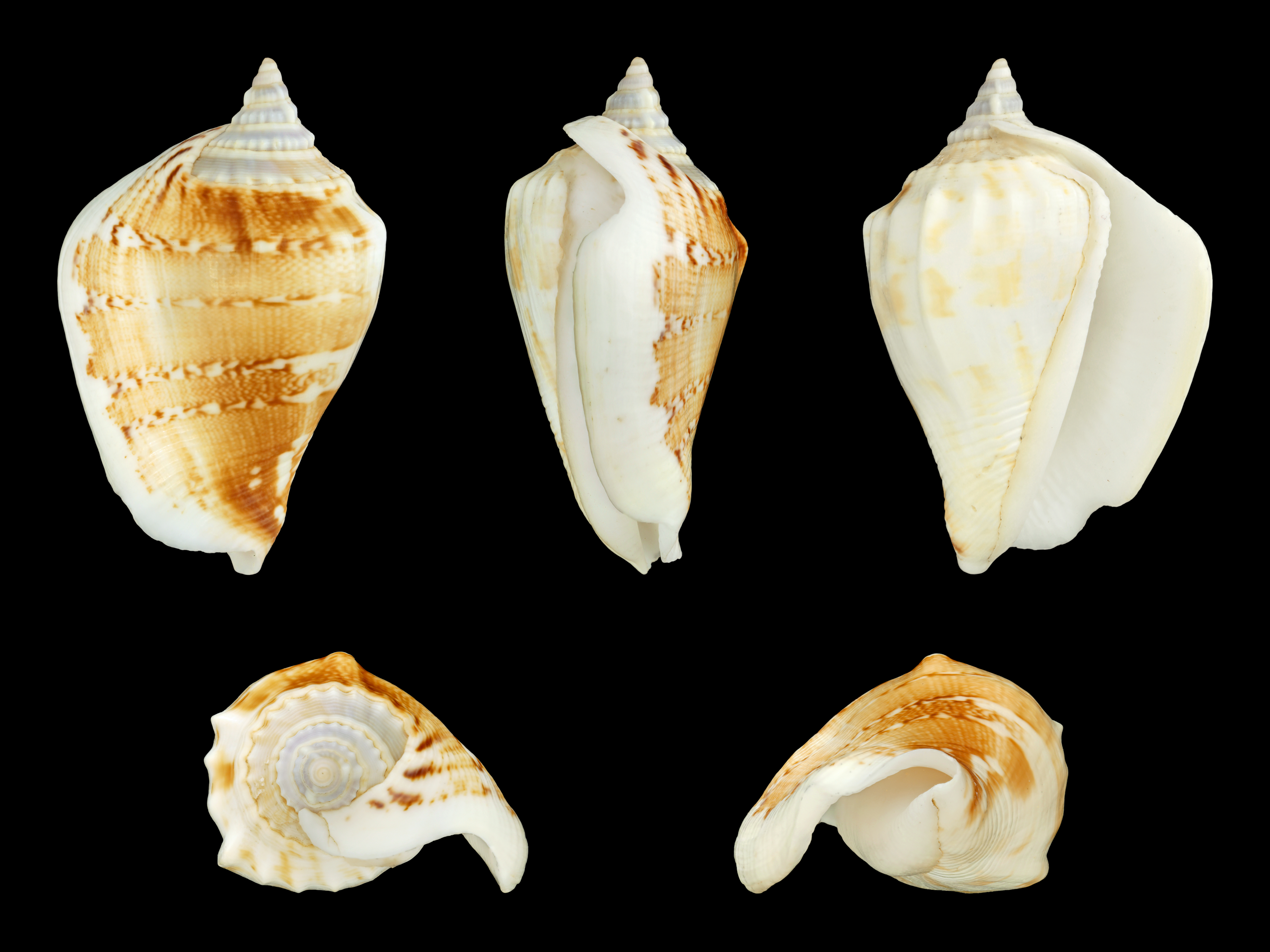
- Margistrombus robustus

Scientific classification
- Kingdom: Animalia
- Phylum: Mollusca
- Class: Gastropoda
- Subclass: Caenogastropoda
- Order: Littorinimorpha
- Superfamily: Stromboidea
- Family: Strombidae
- Genus: Margistrombus; Bandel, 2007

Type species
- Strombus marginatus Linnaeus, 1758

Synonyms
- Neodilatilabrum Dekkers, 2008; Strombus (Margistrombus) Bandel, 2007

= Margistrombus =

Genus of gastropods

Margistrombus is a genus of sea snails, marine gastropod mollusks in the family Strombidae, the true conchs.

== Species ==
Species within the genus Margistrombus include:

- Margistrombus marginatus (Linnaeus, 1758)
- Margistrombus robustus (G.B. Sowerby III, 1875)
- Margistrombus septimus (Duclos, 1844)
- Margistrombus simanoki Liverani, 2013
- Margistrombus succinctus (Linnaeus, 1767)

Species brought into synonymy

- Margistrombus boucheti Thach, 2016: synonym of Margistrombus robustus (G. B. Sowerby III, 1875)
