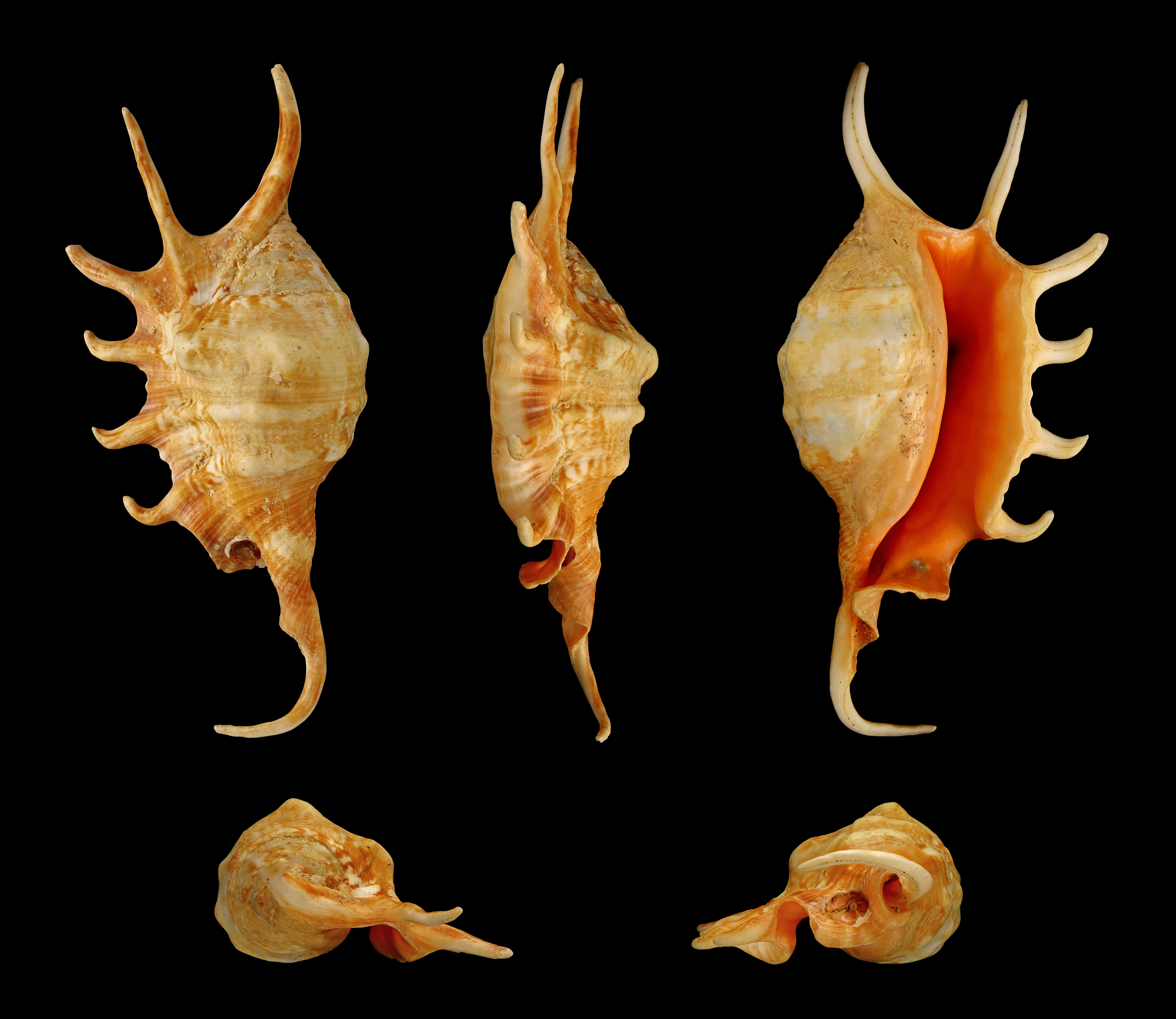
- Five views of a shell of Lambis crocata
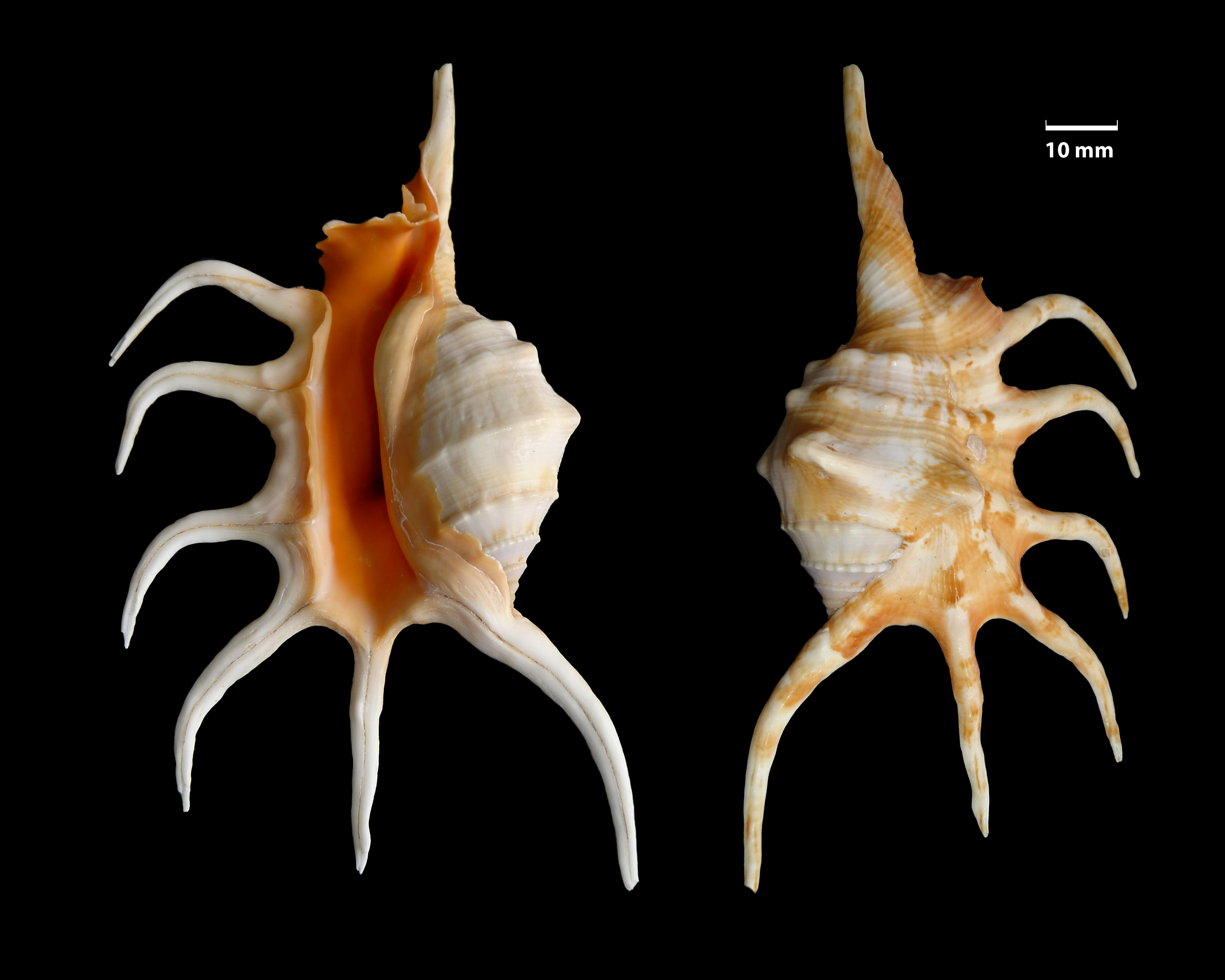
- Two views of a shell of the orange spider conch (Lambis crocata)

Scientific classification
- Kingdom: Animalia
- Phylum: Mollusca
- Class: Gastropoda
- Subclass: Caenogastropoda
- Order: Littorinimorpha
- Family: Strombidae
- Genus: Lambis
- Species: L. crocata

Binomial name
- Lambis crocata (Link, 1807)

Synonyms
- Lambis aurantia (Lamarck, 1822); Pterocera aurantia Lamarck, 1822; Pterocera aurantiacum Sowerby I, 1825; Pterocera crocata Link, 1807 (basionym); Strombus aculeatus Perry, G., 1811

= Lambis crocata =

Species of gastropod

Lambis crocata, the orange spider conch, is a species of large sea snail, a marine gastropod mollusc in the family Strombidae, the true conchs.

== Description ==
Adult shells range from 70 to 205 mm in length. The shell is large and robust, with an exterior that is typically orange to orange-brown and an aperture that is orange to orange-white. Like other species in the genus Lambis, it possesses elongated finger-like projections extending from the outer lip, giving the shell its characteristic “spider conch” appearance.

== Distribution ==
This species is found in the Indian Ocean along the coasts of Aldabra, Chagos, the Comores, Kenya, Madagascar, the Mascarene Basin, Mauritius, Mozambique, Réunion, the Seychelles and Tanzania.
