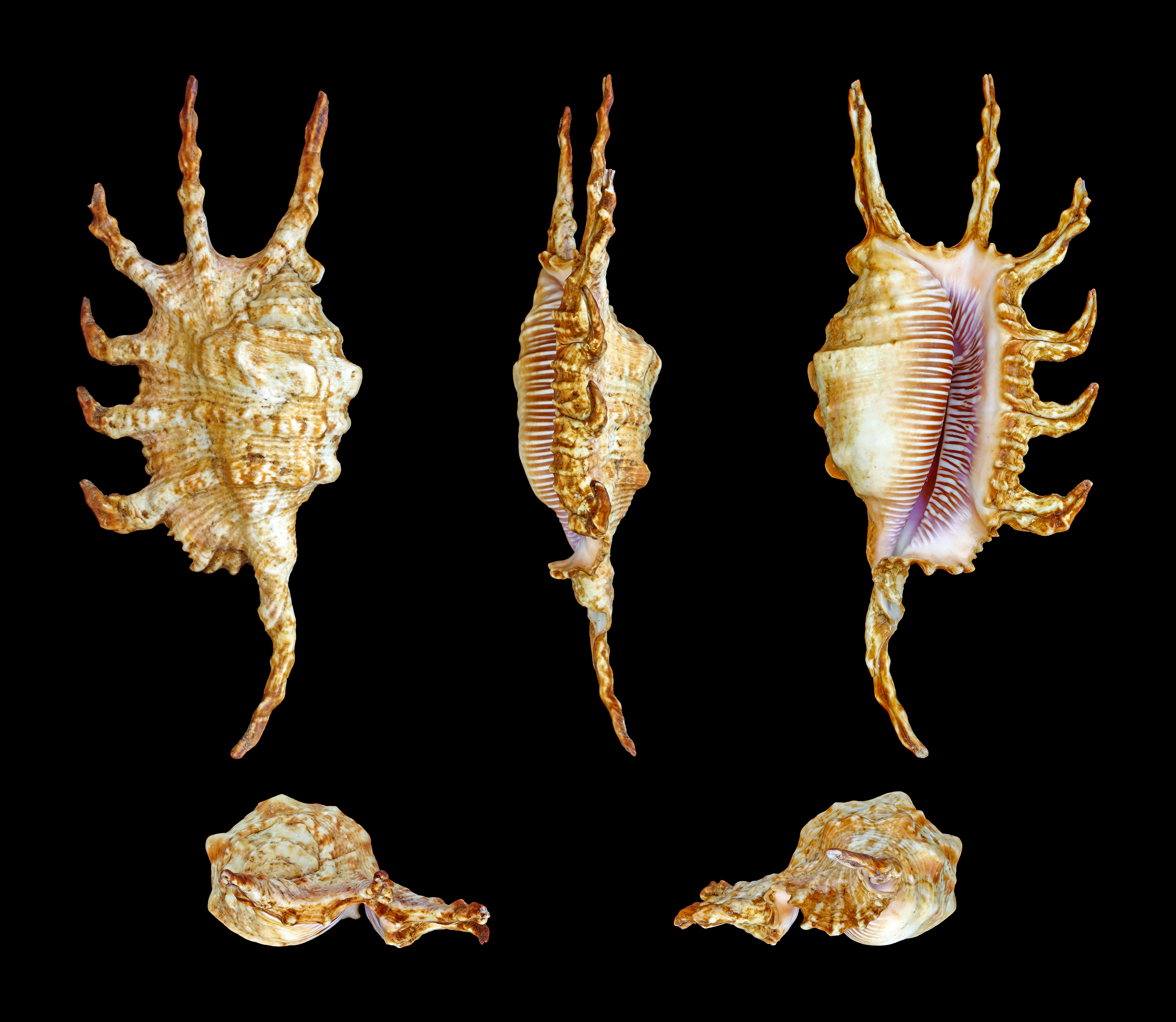
- A shell of Lambis scorpius

Scientific classification
- Kingdom: Animalia
- Phylum: Mollusca
- Class: Gastropoda
- Subclass: Caenogastropoda
- Order: Littorinimorpha
- Family: Strombidae
- Genus: Lambis
- Species: L. scorpius

Binomial name
- Lambis scorpius (Linnaeus, 1758)

Synonyms
- Lambis (Millepes) scorpius (Linnaeus, 1758); Lambis (Millepes) scorpius scorpius (Linnaeus, 1758); Lambis scorpius scorpius (Linnaeus, 1758)· accepted, alternate representation; Pterocera nodosa Lamarck, 1816; Pterocera scorpius (Linnaeus, 1758); Strombus scorpius Linnaeus, 1758 (basionym)

= Lambis scorpius =

Species of gastropod

Lambis scorpius, the scorpion conch or scorpion spider conch, is a species of large sea snail, a marine gastropod mollusc in the family Strombidae, the true conchs.

== Subspecies ==
- Lambis scorpius indomaris Abbott, 1961

== Description ==
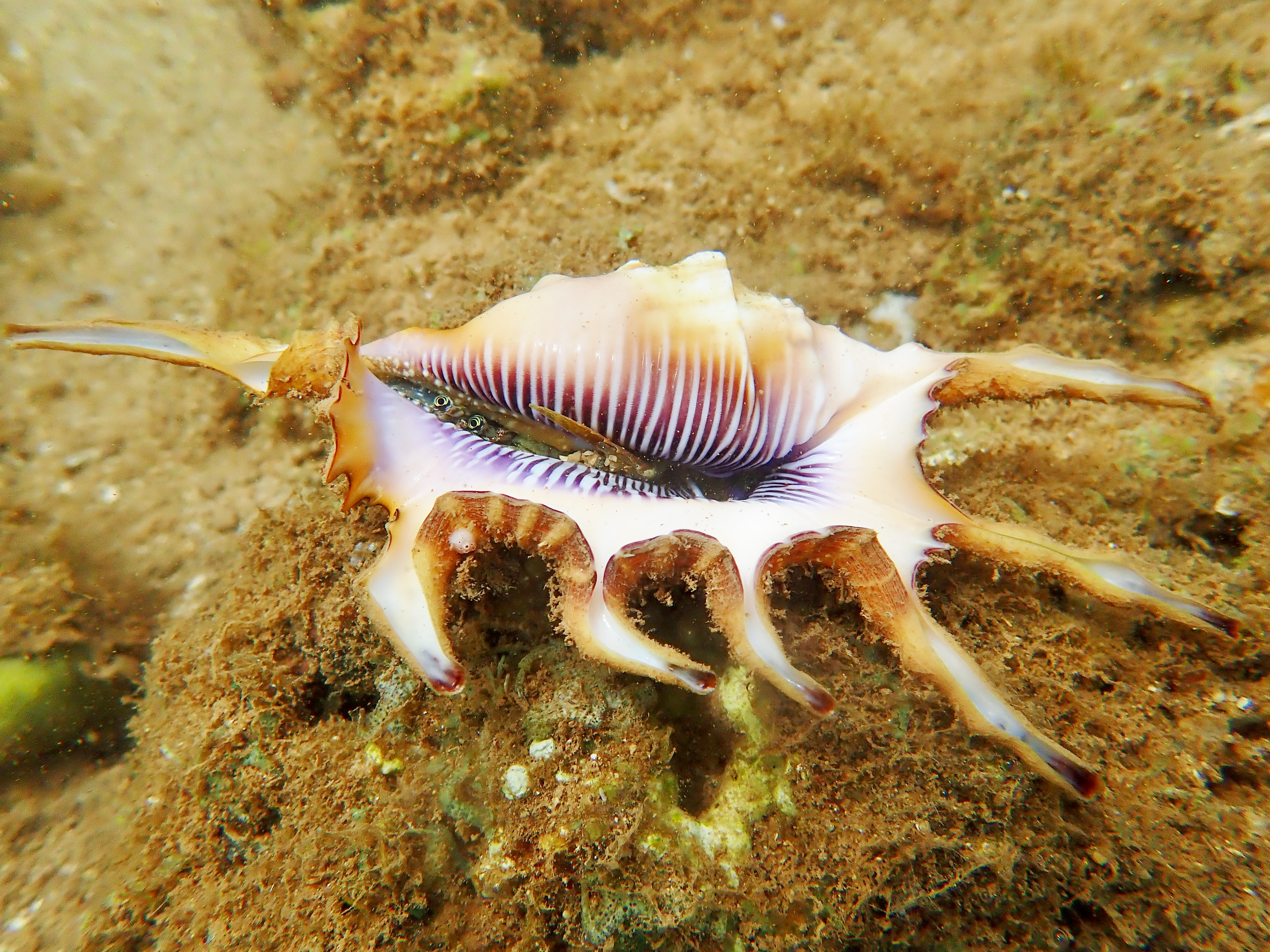
Scorpion conch (Lambis scorpius) in Mayotte. The eyes and operculum are visible.

The length of an adult shell varies between 95 mm and 220 mm.

== Distribution ==
This species occurs in the Indian Ocean off Chagos, Madagascar, Kenya and Tanzania; in the Western Pacific and off the Philippines.
