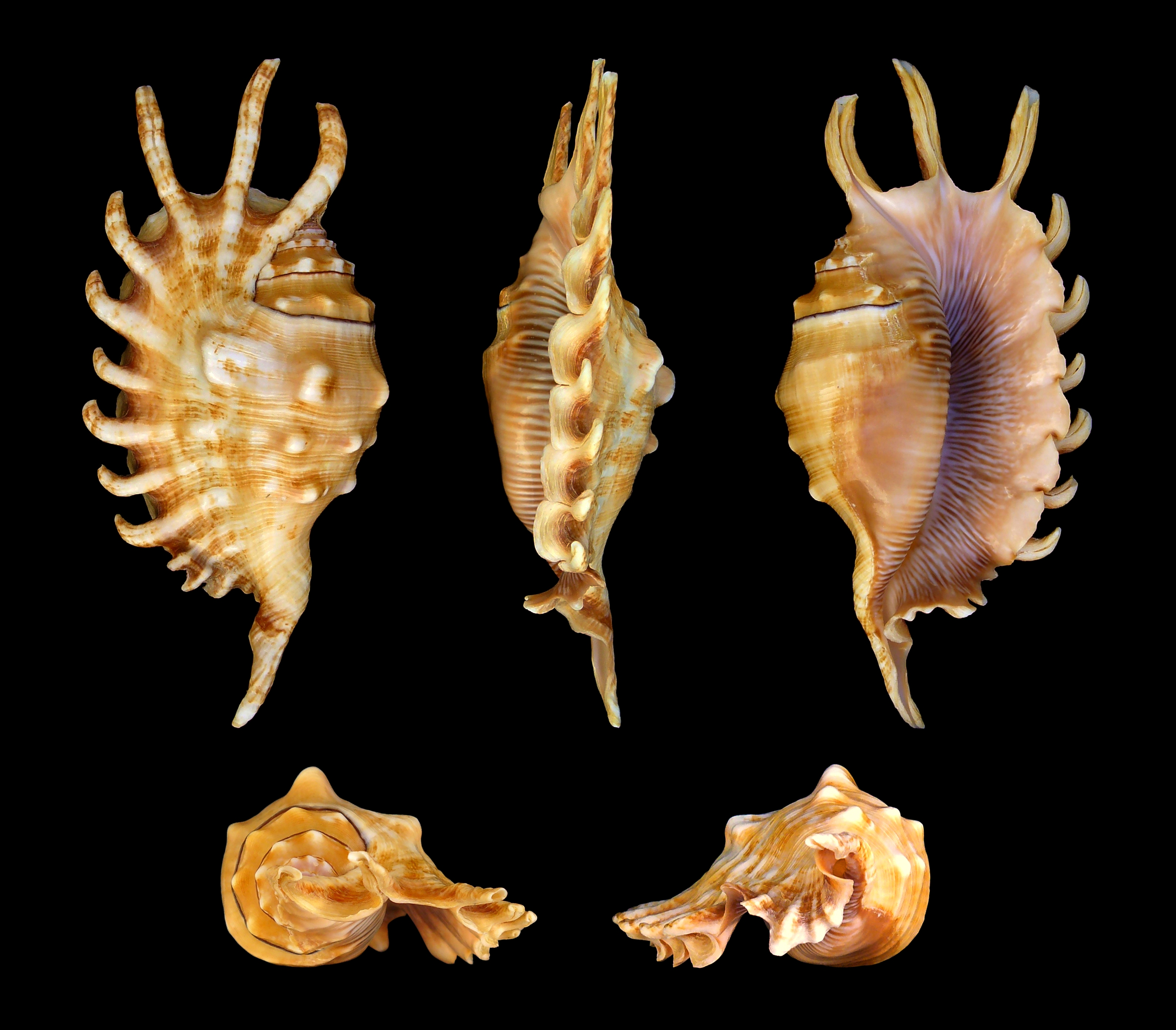
- Five views of a shell of Lambis millepeda

Scientific classification
- Kingdom: Animalia
- Phylum: Mollusca
- Class: Gastropoda
- Subclass: Caenogastropoda
- Order: Littorinimorpha
- Family: Strombidae
- Genus: Lambis
- Species: L. millepeda

Binomial name
- Lambis millepeda (Linnaeus, 1758)

Synonyms
- Pterocera millipeda (Linnaeus, 1758); Strombus millepeda Linnaeus, 1758 (basionym)

= Lambis millepeda =

Species of gastropod

Lambis millepeda, the millipede spider conch, is a species of sea snail, a marine gastropod mollusc in the family Strombidae, the true conchs.

== Description ==
Classic lambis design. The legs are round and short in structure. The color extends from white, sand-colored with light brown shades. The underside has black furrows in the mouth. The size of an adult shell varies between 90–201 mm.

== Distribution ==
This species occurs in the Indian Ocean off Madagascar and in the Southwest Pacific Ocean.
