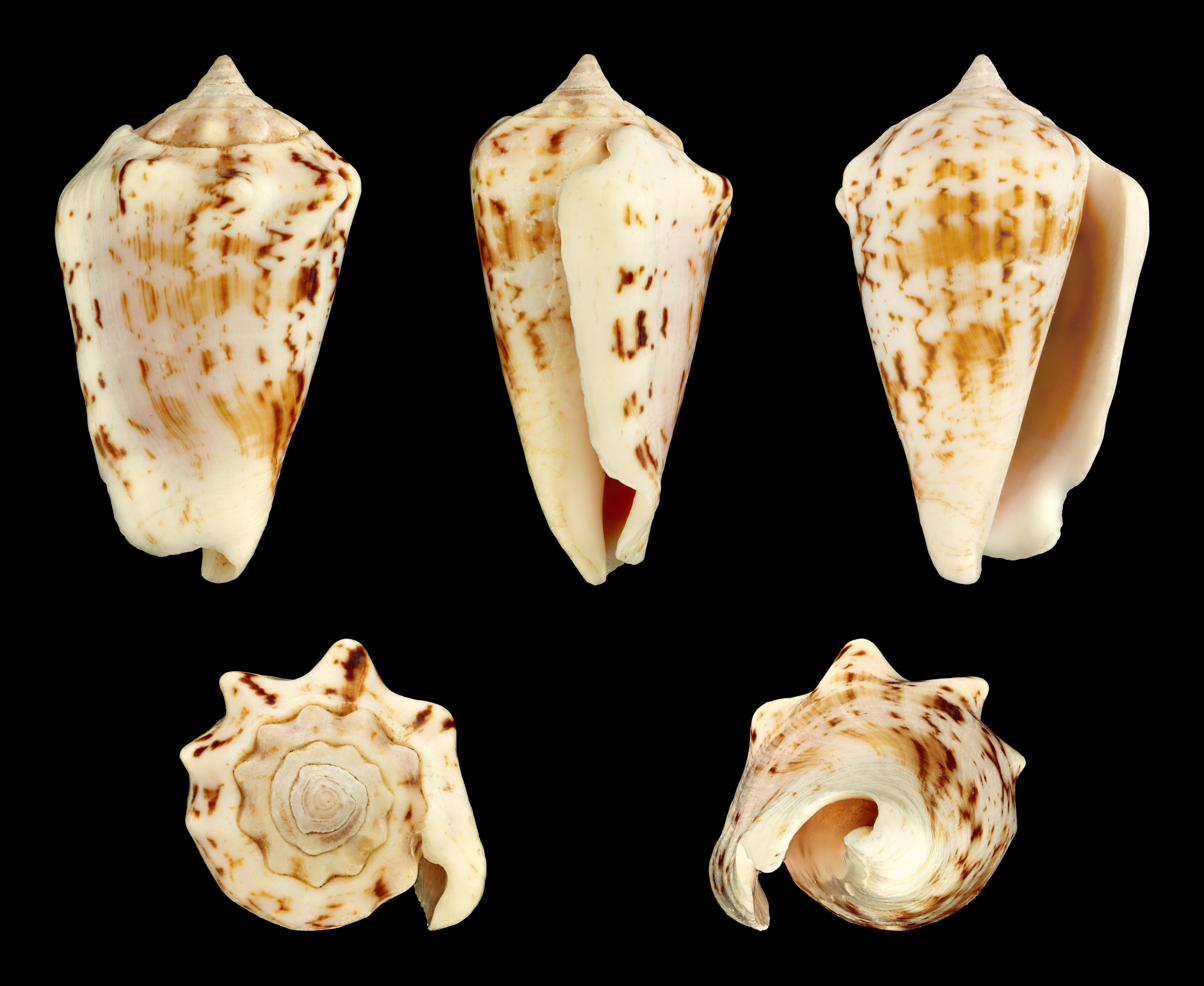

Scientific classification
- Kingdom: Animalia
- Phylum: Mollusca
- Class: Gastropoda
- Subclass: Caenogastropoda
- Order: Littorinimorpha
- Superfamily: Stromboidea
- Family: Strombidae
- Genus: Conomurex
- Species: C. decorus

Binomial name
- Conomurex decorus (Röding, 1798)

Synonyms
- Strombus decorus (Röding, 1798); Strombus cylindricus Swainson, 1821; Strombus mauritianus Lamarck, 1822

= Conomurex decorus =

Species of gastropod

Conomurex decorus, the Mauritian conch, is a species of sea snail, a marine gastropod mollusk in the family Strombidae, the true conchs.

== Description ==
The shell size varies between 35 mm and 80 mm.

== Distribution ==
- Mediterranean Sea
- Red Sea
- Indian Ocean near Aldabra Atoll, the Mascarene Basin, Mauritius and Tanzania
- Pacific Ocean near Singapore.
