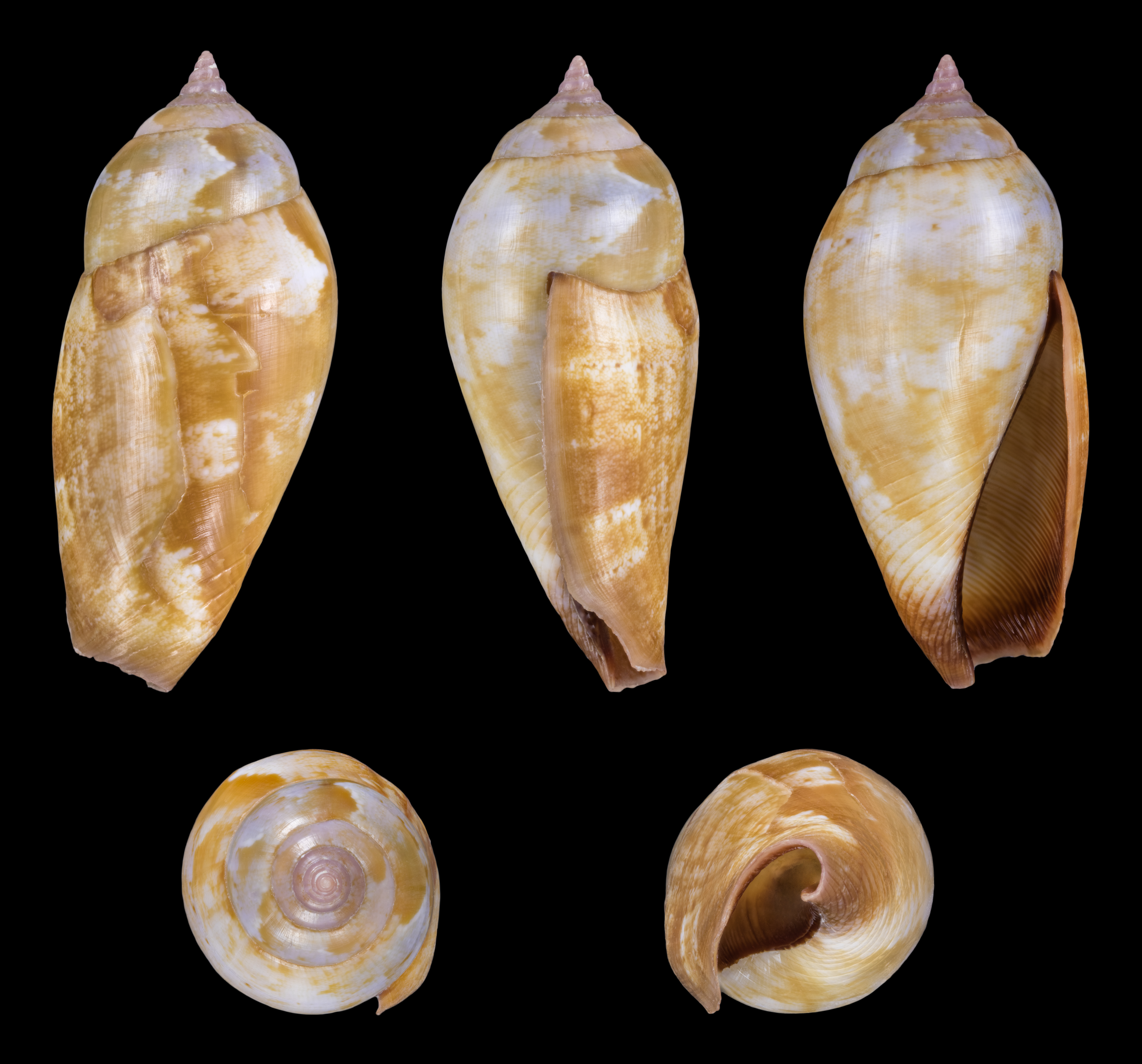
- Terestrombus fragilis

Scientific classification
- Kingdom: Animalia
- Phylum: Mollusca
- Class: Gastropoda
- Subclass: Caenogastropoda
- Order: Littorinimorpha
- Family: Strombidae
- Genus: Terestrombus
- Species: T. fragilis

Binomial name
- Terestrombus fragilis (Röding, 1798)

Synonyms
- Lambis fragilis Röding, 1798 (basionym); Strombus bulbulus Sowerby II, 1842; Strombus dubius Swainson, 1823

= Terestrombus fragilis =

Species of gastropod

Terestrombus fragilis, common name : the Fragile Conch, is a species of sea snail, a marine gastropod mollusk in the family Strombidae, the true conchs.

== Description ==
The shell size varies between 25 mm and 53 mm.

== Distribution ==
This species is distributed in the western and central part of the Pacific Ocean and along the Philippines.
