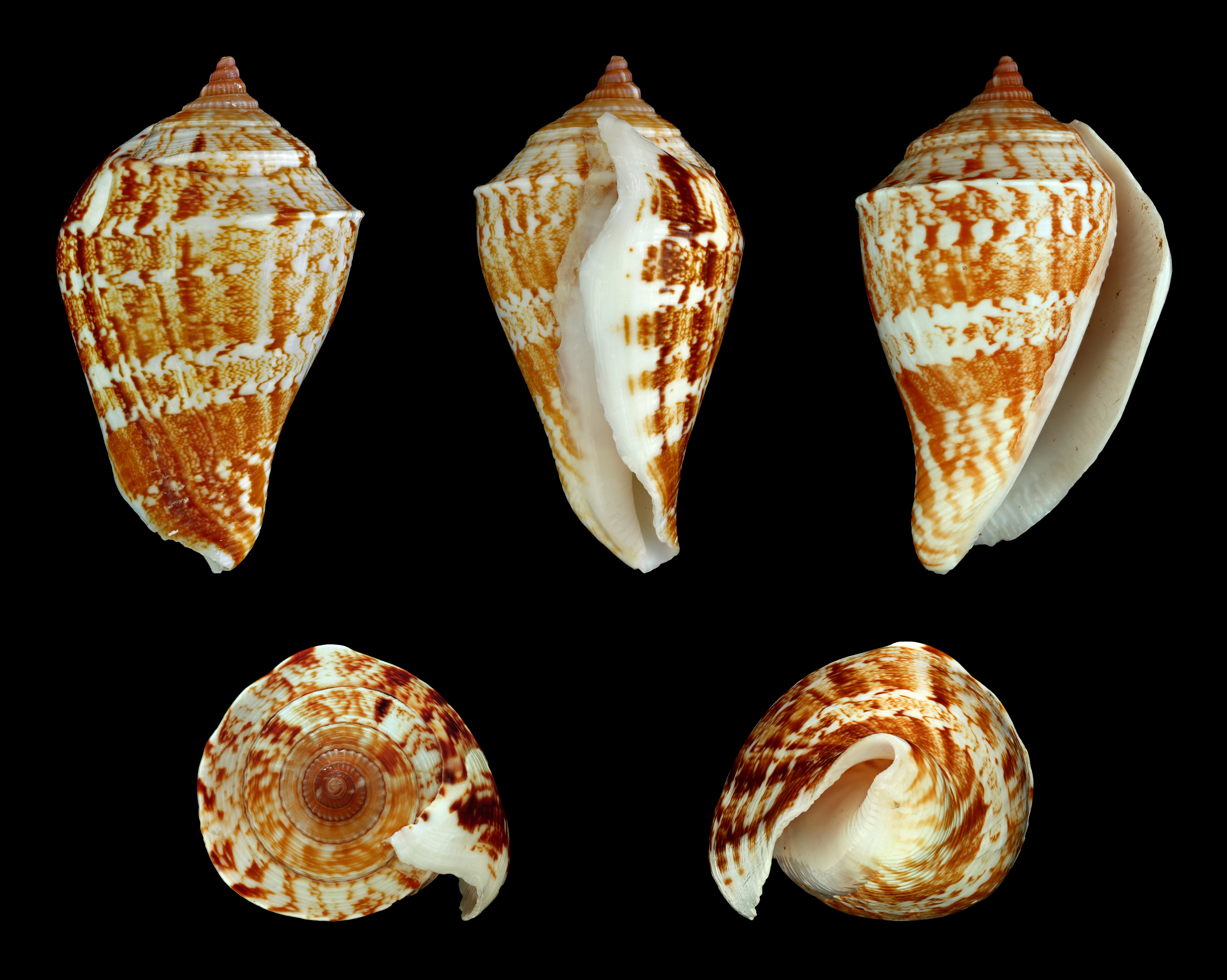
- Margistrombus marginatus marginatus

Scientific classification
- Kingdom: Animalia
- Phylum: Mollusca
- Class: Gastropoda
- Subclass: Caenogastropoda
- Order: Littorinimorpha
- Family: Strombidae
- Genus: Margistrombus
- Species: M. marginatus

Binomial name
- Margistrombus marginatus (Linnaeus, 1758)

Synonyms
- Lambis carinata Röding, 1798; Strombus marginatus Linnaeus, 1758 (basionym)

= Margistrombus marginatus =

Species of gastropod

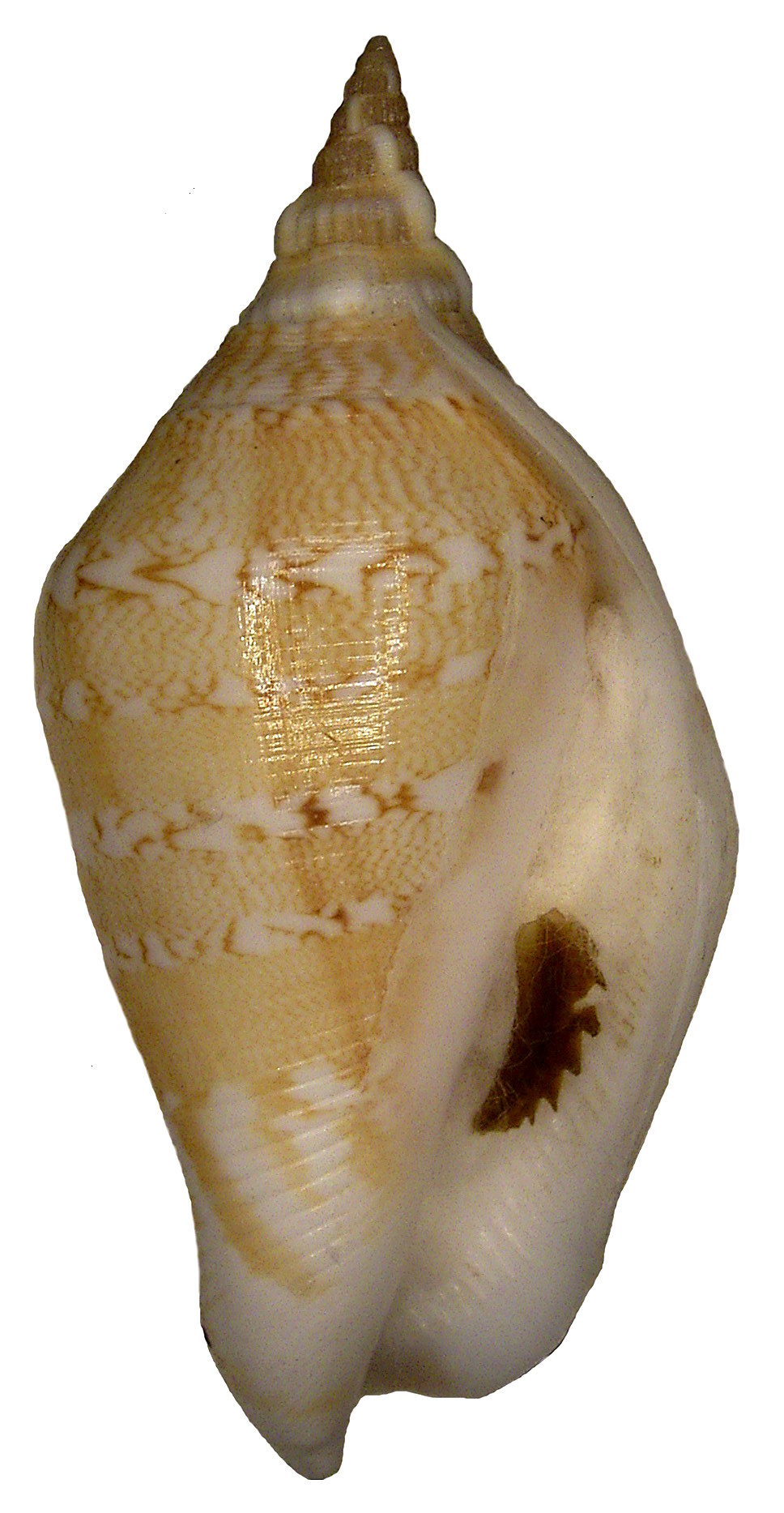
Margistrombus marginatus succincta

Margistrombus marginatus, the marginate conch, is a species of sea snail, a marine gastropod mollusc in the family Strombidae, the true conchs.

== Subspecies ==
- Margistrombus marginatus sowerbyorum Visser & Man In’t Veld, 2005
- Margistrombus marginatus succincta (Linnaeus, 1758)

== Description ==
The shell size varies between 40 mm and 75 mm.

== Distribution ==
This species occurs in the Andaman Sea, at the southern tip of India and the Strait of Malacca.
