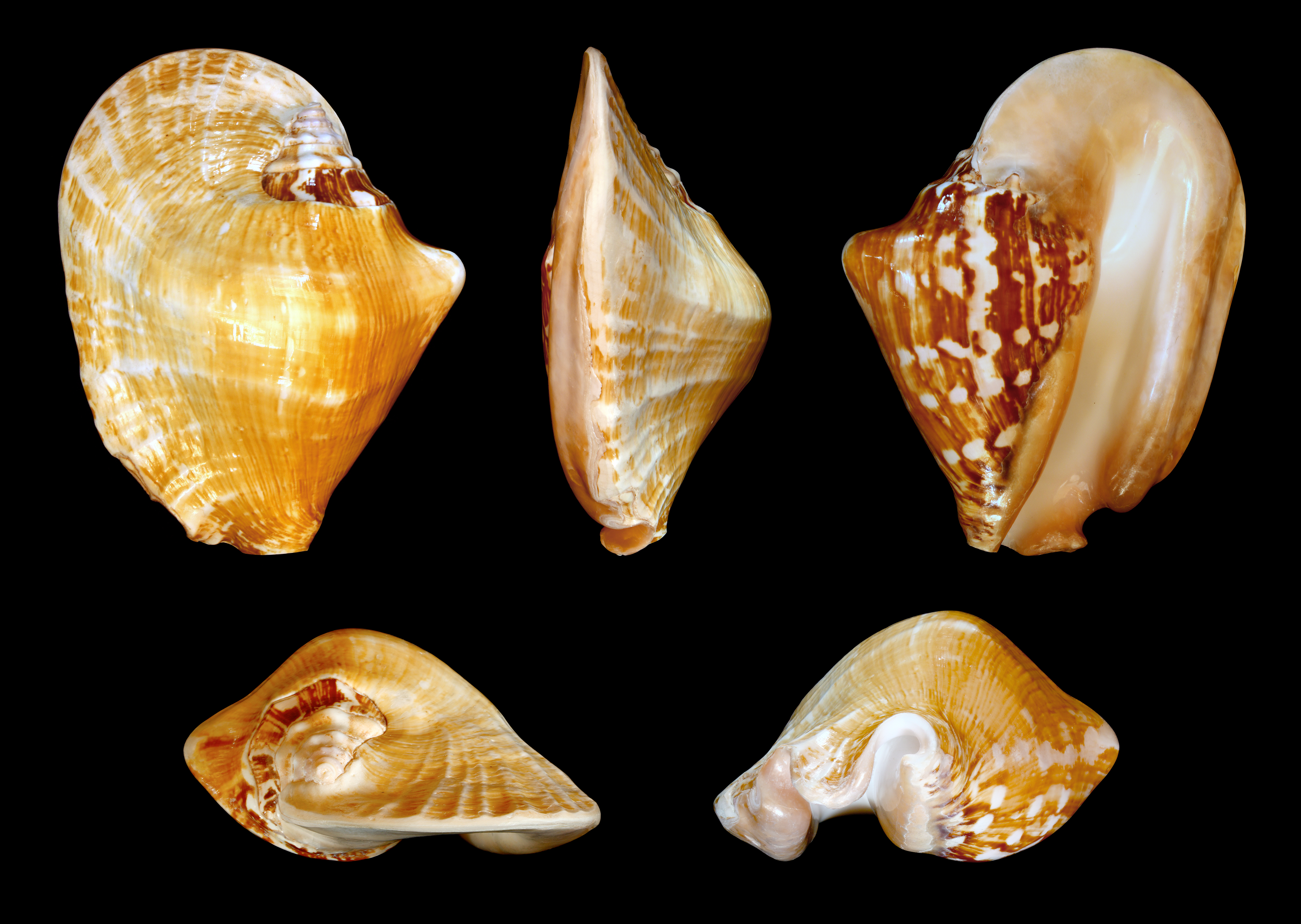
- Five views of a 12 cm shell of Sinustrombus latissimus from the Philippines

Scientific classification
- Kingdom: Animalia
- Phylum: Mollusca
- Class: Gastropoda
- Subclass: Caenogastropoda
- Order: Littorinimorpha
- Superfamily: Stromboidea
- Family: Strombidae
- Genus: Sinustrombus
- Species: S. latissimus

Binomial name
- Sinustrombus latissimus (Linnaeus, 1758)

= Sinustrombus latissimus =

Species of gastropod

Sinustrombus latissimus is a species of sea snail, a marine gastropod mollusk in the family Strombidae, the true conchs.
