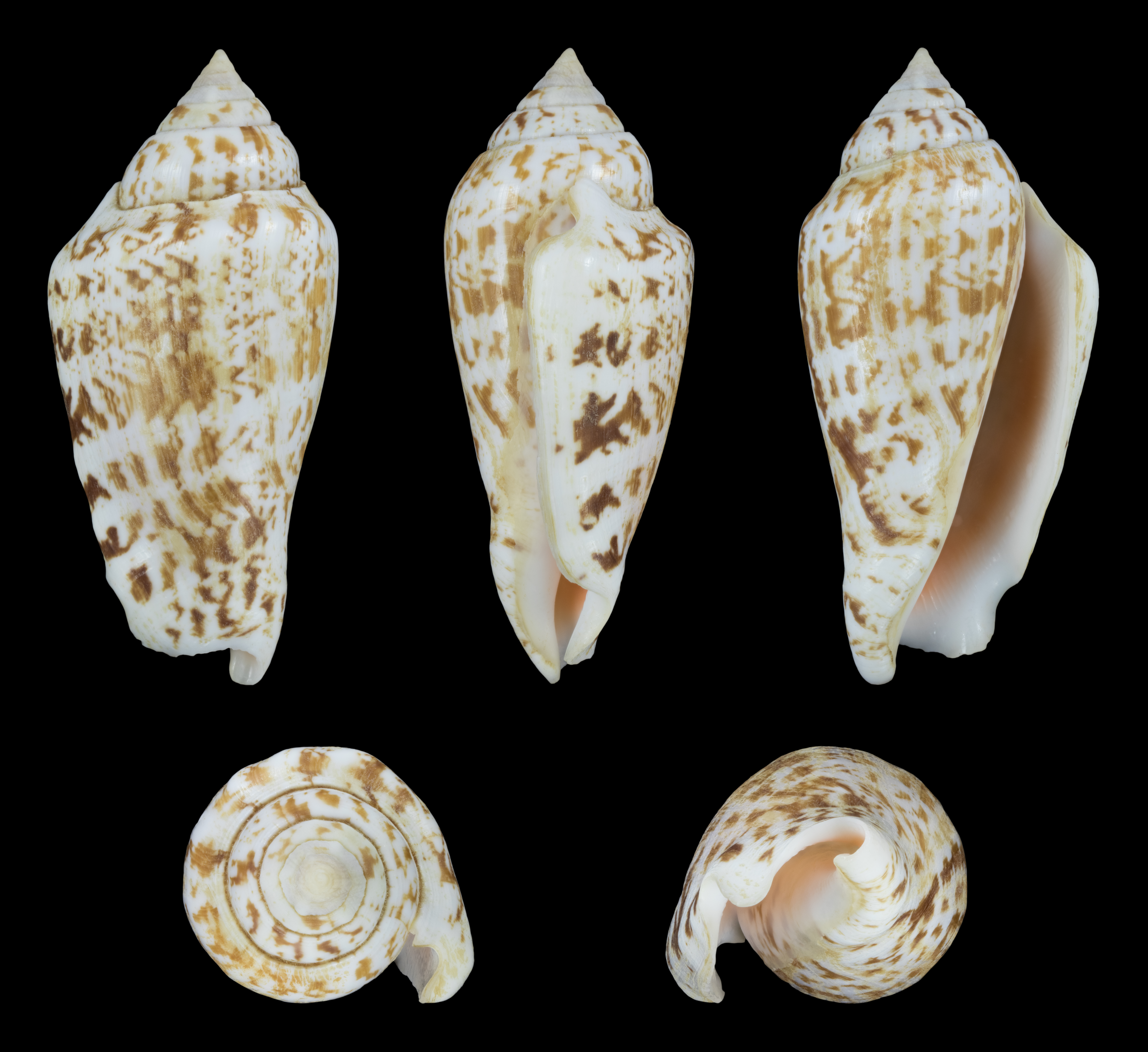

Scientific classification
- Kingdom: Animalia
- Phylum: Mollusca
- Class: Gastropoda
- Subclass: Caenogastropoda
- Order: Littorinimorpha
- Superfamily: Stromboidea
- Family: Strombidae
- Genus: Conomurex
- Species: C. persicus

Binomial name
- Conomurex persicus (Swainson, 1821)

Synonyms
- Strombus persicus (Swainson, 1821); Conomurex decorus raybaudii Nicolay, K. & E. Romagna-Manoja, 198

= Conomurex persicus =

Species of gastropod

Conomurex persicus, common name : the Persian conch, is a species of sea snail, a marine gastropod mollusk in the family Strombidae, the true conchs.

== Description ==
The shell size varies between 35 mm and 75 mm

== Distribution ==
This species is found in the Mediterranean Sea along Greece, as alien species immigrated by Suez Canal (Albano et al., 2021) in the Arabian Sea and the Persian Gulf.
