= George Humphrey (naturalist) =

George Humphrey (c. 1739–1826) was an English auctioneer and dealer.

Humphrey purchased and sold "curiosities", notably shells, insect and bird specimens and ethnographic specimens. Much of his stock was purchased from ships' crews, in particular from Captain Cook's voyages. His 1810 address was 48 Long Acre, 4 Leicester Street, Leicester Square, London. His sister Elizabeth (1735–1816) married a leading international mineral dealer Adolarius Jacob Forster and she ran Forster's London shop.

== Bibliography ==
George Humphrey wrote and published:

- Humphrey, G., 1782. Catalogue of Manufactures, Mechanical Performances and other Inventions of the Natives of the new-discovered, or but seldom visited Countries in the pacific Ocean.
- Humphrey, G., 1799 Museum Humfredianum.
