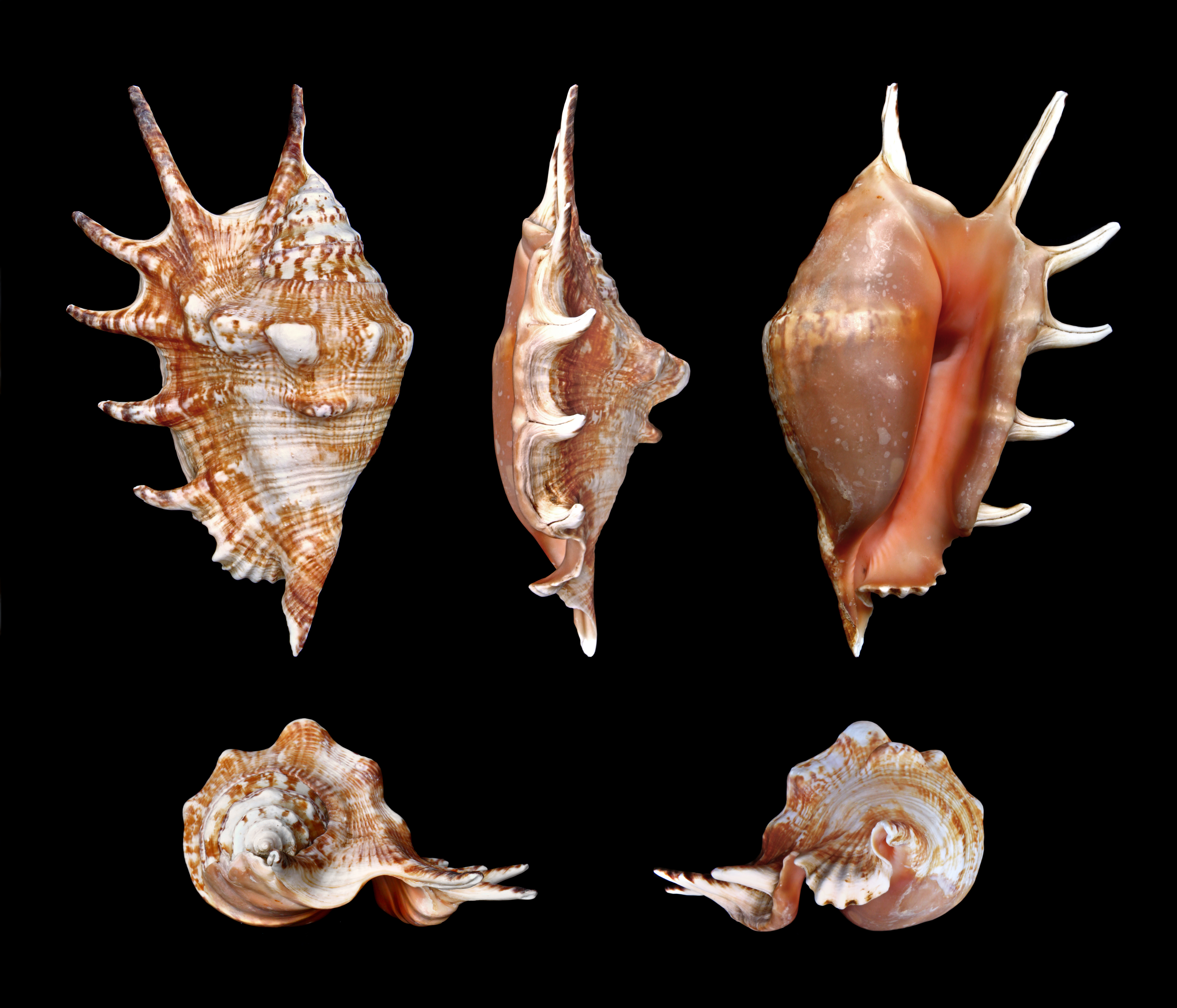
- Male
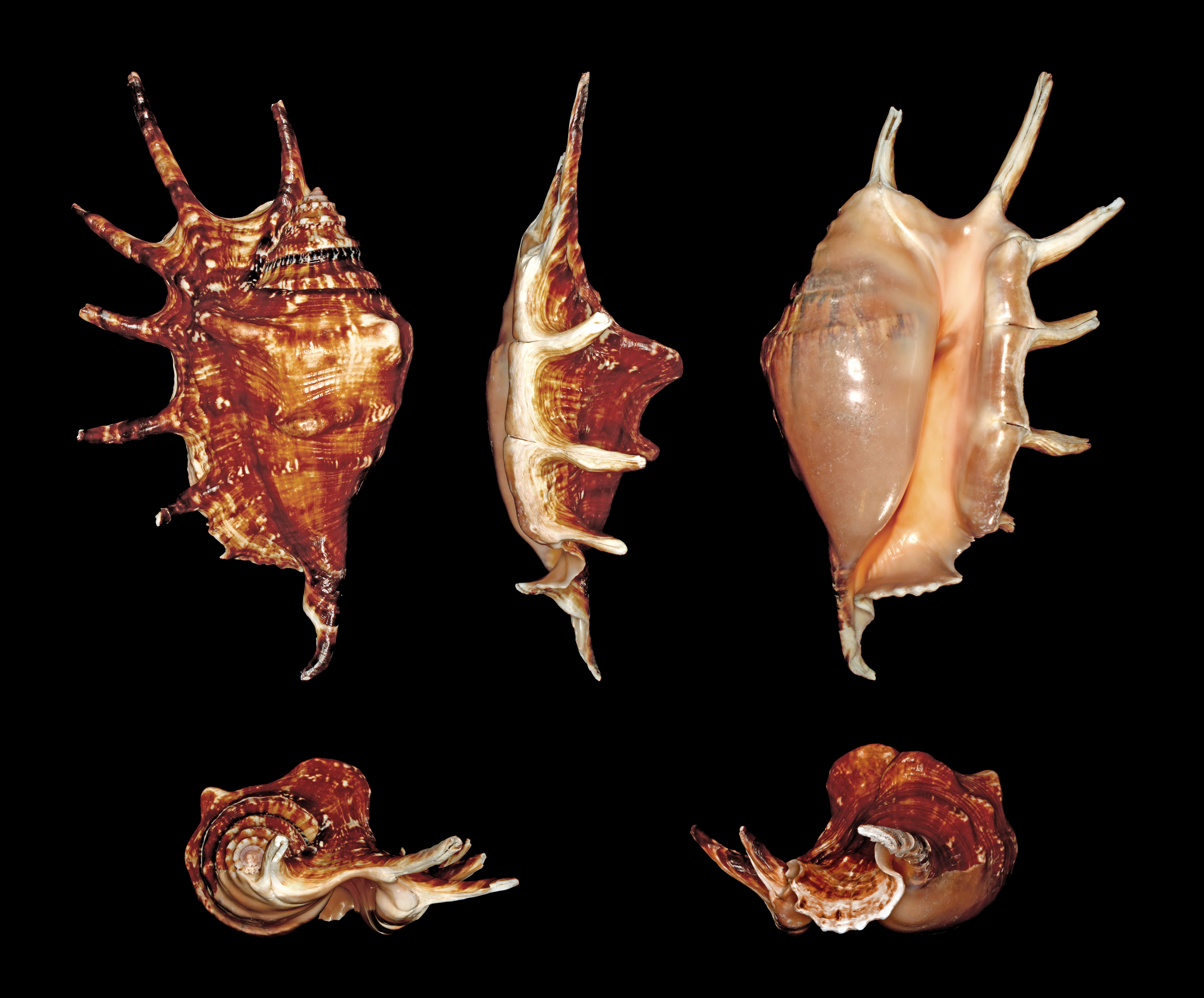
- Female

Scientific classification
- Kingdom: Animalia
- Phylum: Mollusca
- Class: Gastropoda
- Subclass: Caenogastropoda
- Order: Littorinimorpha
- Family: Strombidae
- Genus: Lambis
- Species: L. lambis

Binomial name
- Lambis lambis (Linnaeus, 1758)

Synonyms
- List: Lambis adamii Bozzetti & Cossignani, 2003; Lambis cerea Röding, 1798; Lambis hermaphrodita Röding, 1798; Lambis laciniata Röding, 1798; Lambis lamboides Röding, 1798; Lambis lobata Röding, 1798; Lambis maculata Röding, 1798; Pterocera lambis (Linnaeus, 1758); Pterocera crocata Link, 1807; Strombus lambis Linnaeus, 1758 (basionym)

= Lambis lambis =

Species of gastropod

Lambis lambis, common name the spider conch, is a species of large sea snail, a marine gastropod mollusc in the family Strombidae, the true conchs.

== Distribution ==
This species is widespread in the Indo-West Pacific.

== Shell description ==
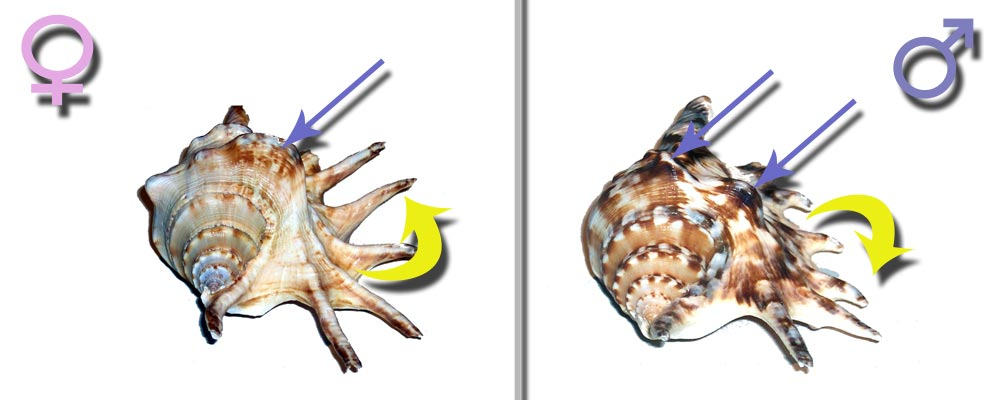
Sexual dimorphism in the shell of Lambis lambis. Female on the left, male on the right. Arrows indicate the differences in morphology.

The maximum shell length for this species is up to 29 cm, and average length stands for 18 cm. Lambis lambis has a very large, robust and heavy shell. One of its most striking characteristics is its flared outer lip, ornamented by six hollow marginal digitations. These digitations present subtle differences in shape between genders in this species, as the three anteriormost digitations are short and posteriorly bent in male individuals, and longer and dorsally recurved in females. The color of the shell is highly variable, being white or cream externally and often presenting brown, purplish or bluish black patches. The interior is glazed and may be pink, orange or purple.

== Ecology ==
=== Habitat ===
This sea snail lives in mangrove areas, as well as reef flats and coral-rubble bottoms in shallow water from low tide levels to depths of 5m. It is usually found in association with red algae.

=== Feeding habits ===
Lambis lambis is known to be herbivorous, feeding on fine red algae.

== Gallery ==
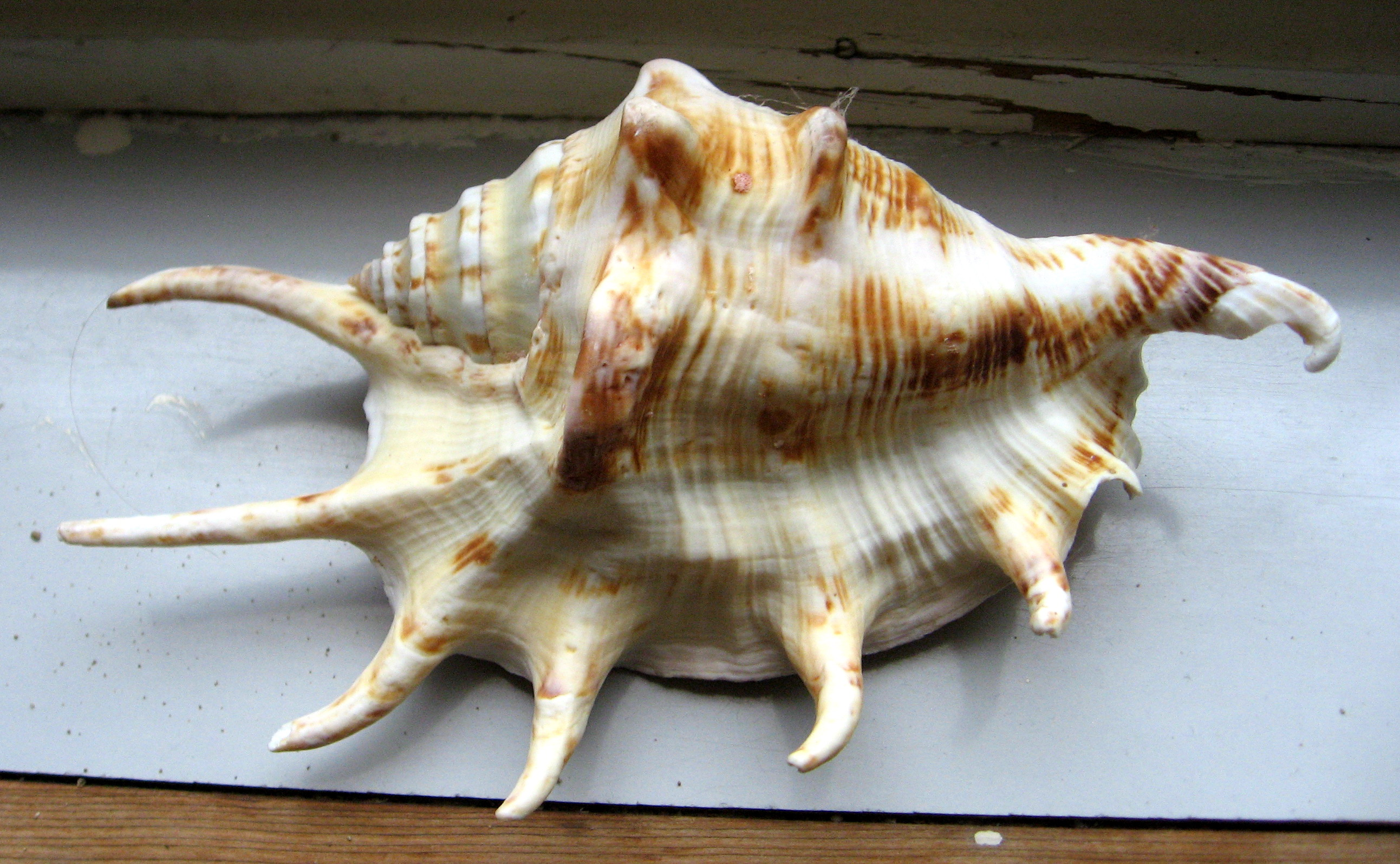
Spider conch, Lambis lambis, anterior end to the right

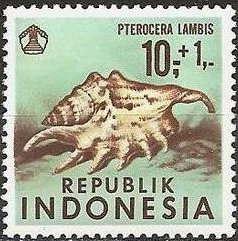
Lambis lambis on a 1969 Indonesia postage stamp
