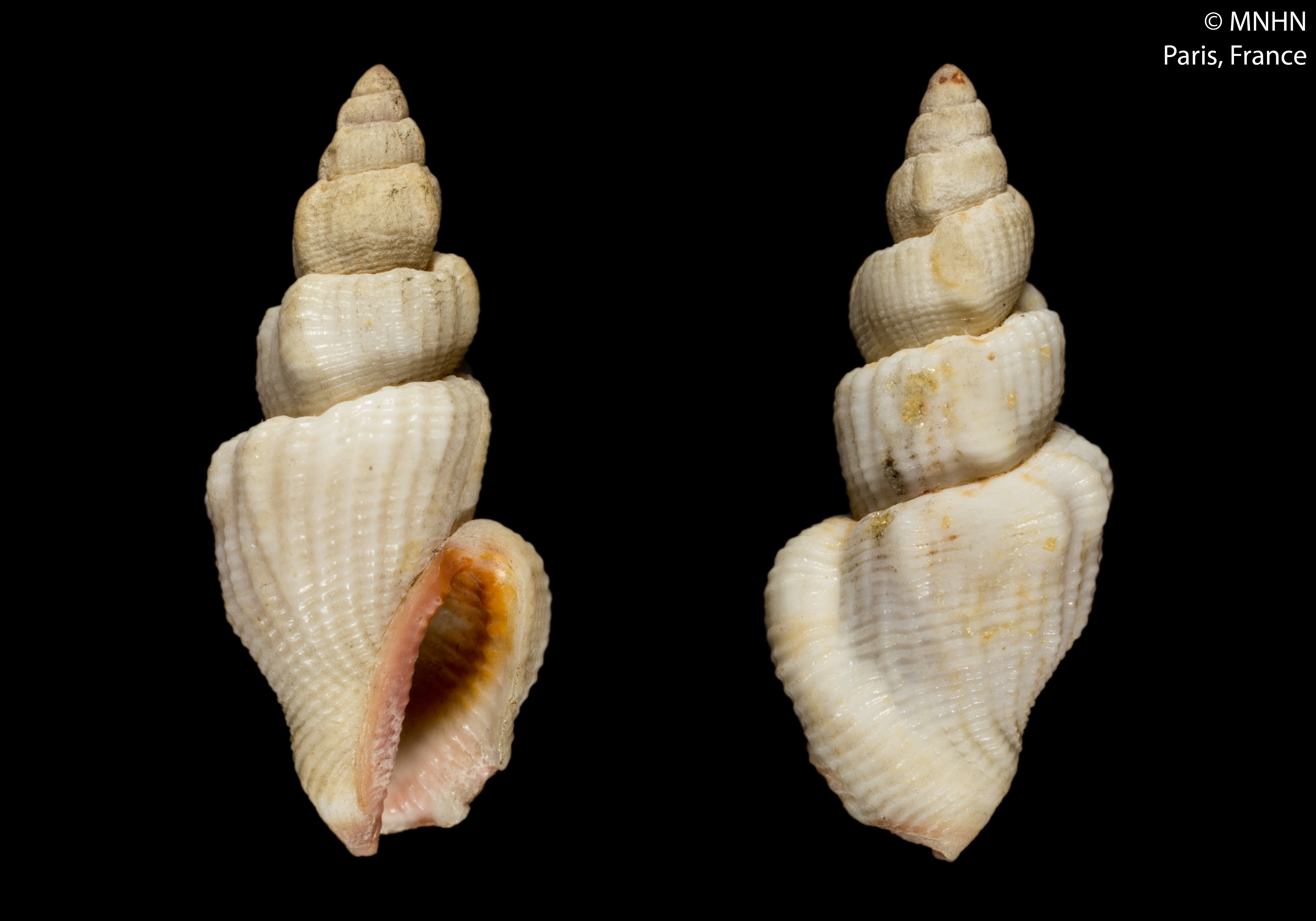
- Shell of Hawaiistrombus scalariformis (syntype at MNHN, Paris)

Scientific classification
- Kingdom: Animalia
- Phylum: Mollusca
- Class: Gastropoda
- Subclass: Caenogastropoda
- Order: Littorinimorpha
- Family: Strombidae
- Genus: Hawaiistrombus
- Species: H. scalariformis

Binomial name
- Hawaiistrombus scalariformis (Duclos, 1833)

Synonyms
- Canarium (Hawaiistrombus) scalariforme (Duclos, 1833) · unaccepted > superseded combination; Canarium (Stereostrombus) scalariforme (Duclos, 1833) · unaccepted (superseded combination); Canarium haemastoma (G. B. Sowerby II, 1842); Canarium scalariforme (Duclos, 1833) superseded combination; Strombus (Canarium) haemastoma (G. B. Sowerby II, 1842); Strombus haemastoma Sowerby II, 1842; Strombus scalariformis Duclos, 1833 (original combination)

= Hawaiistrombus scalariformis =

Species of gastropod

Hawaiistrombus scalariformis is a species of sea snail, a marine gastropod mollusk in the family Strombidae, the true conchs.

== Distribution ==
This species occurs in the Indian Ocean off the Mascarene Basin.

== Phylogeny ==
- - - - - - - Strombus maculatus
            - Strombus mutabilis
          - - Strombus microurceus
            - Strombus labiatus
        - - - Strombus fragilis
            - Strombus urceus
          - Strombus dentatus
      - - - Strombus canarium
          - Strombus vittatus
        - Strombus epidromis
    - - Strombus fusiformis
      - Strombus haemastoma
  - Strombus wilsoni

Part of the phylogeny and relationships of Strombus species, according to Latiolais et al. (2006)

In 2006, Latiolais and colleagues proposed a cladogram that attempts to show the phylogenetic relationships of 34 species within the family Strombidae. The authors analysed 31 species in the genus Strombus including Canarium haemastoma (referred to as Strombus haemastoma in their analysis), and three species in the allied genus Lambis. The cladogram was based on DNA sequences of both nuclear histone H3 and mitochondrial cytochrome-c oxidase I (COI) protein-coding gene regions. In this proposed phylogeny, Strombus labiatus (= Canarium labiatum) and Strombus microurceus are closely related and appear to share a common ancestor.
