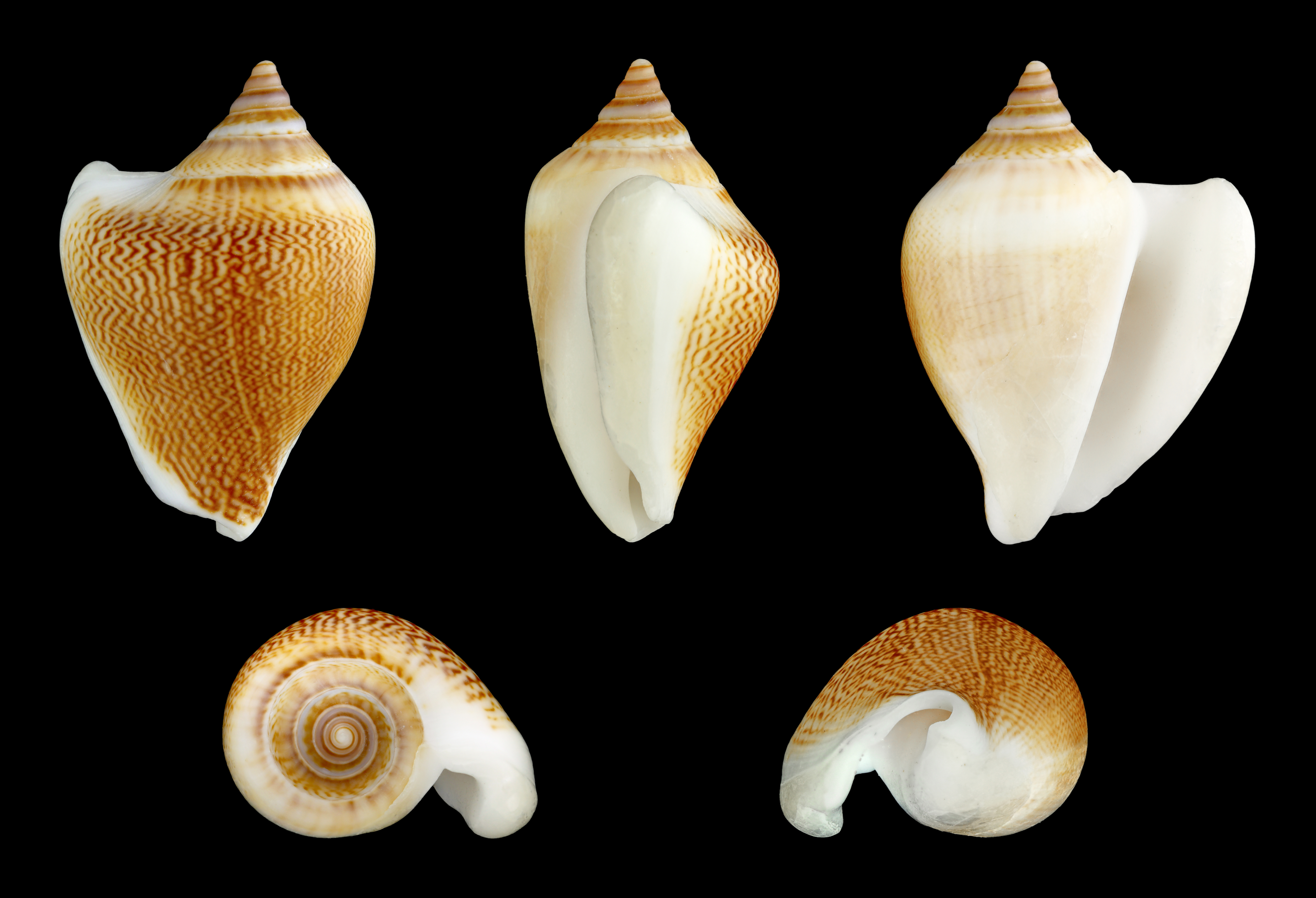
- Five different views of a shell of an adult L. canarium: abapertural (upper left), right lateral (center), apertural (upper right), apical (lower left) and basal (lower right)

Scientific classification
- Kingdom: Animalia
- Phylum: Mollusca
- Class: Gastropoda
- Subclass: Caenogastropoda
- Order: Littorinimorpha
- Family: Strombidae
- Genus: Laevistrombus
- Species: L. canarium

Binomial name
- Laevistrombus canarium (Linnaeus, 1758)
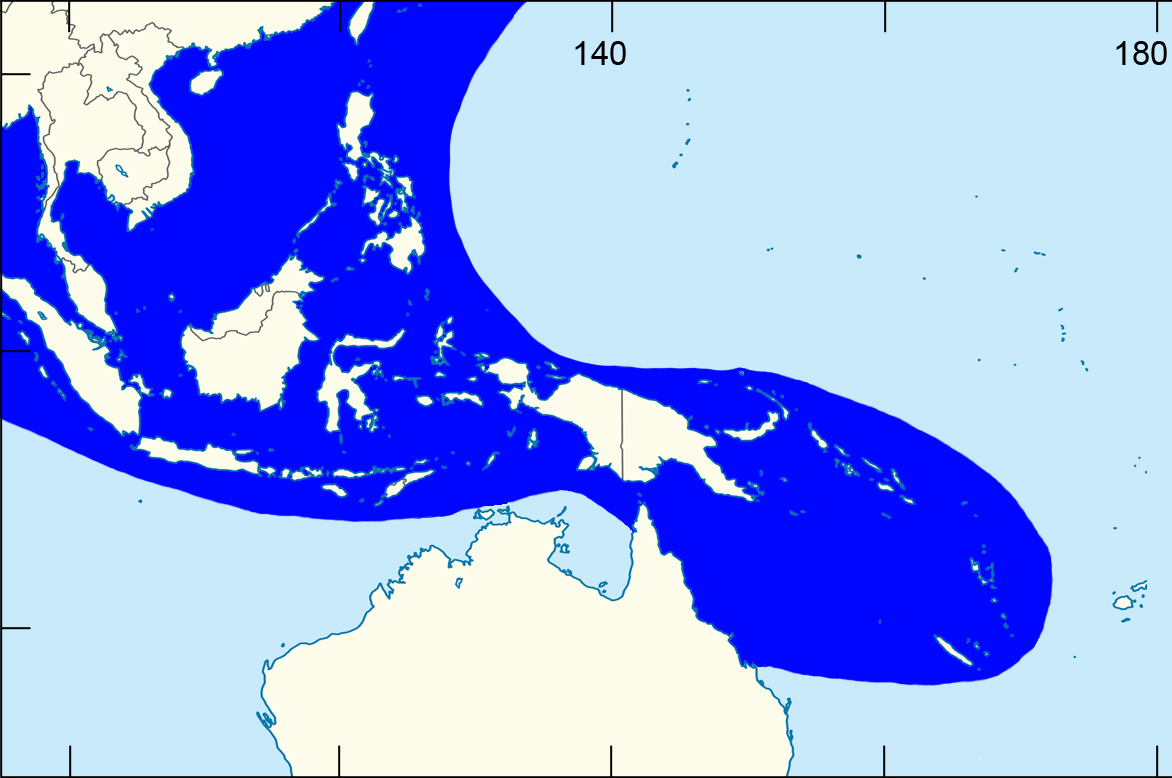
- The shaded area indicates the distribution of Laevistrombus canarium within the Western Central Pacific, according to Poutiers, 1998.

Synonyms
- Strombus canarium Linnaeus, 1758 (original combination); Strombus gibbus Issel & Canefri, 1876

= Laevistrombus canarium =

Species of sea snail

Laevistrombus canarium (commonly known as the dog conch or by its better-known synonym, Strombus canarium) is a species of edible sea snail, a marine gastropod mollusc in the family Strombidae (true conches). Known from illustrations in books dating from the late 17th century, L. canarium is an Indo-Pacific species occurring from India and Sri Lanka to Melanesia, Australia and southern Japan. The shell of adult individuals is coloured from light yellowish-brown to golden to grey. It has a characteristic inflated body whorl, a flared, thick outer lip, and a shallow stromboid notch. The shell is valued as an ornament, and because it is heavy and compact, it is also often used as a sinker for fishing nets.

The external anatomy of the soft parts of this species is similar to that of other strombid snails. The animal has an elongated snout, thin eyestalks with well-developed eyes and sensory tentacles, and a narrow, strong foot with a sickle-shaped operculum. A molecular analysis conducted in 2006 based on DNA sequences of histone and mitochondrial genes demonstrated that Laevistrombus canarium, Doxander vittatus, and Labiostrombus epidromis are closely related species. The dog conch exhibits behaviours common among the Strombidae, including burrowing and a characteristic leaping form of locomotion. The former behaviour, however, involves movement sequences unique to this species.

Laevistrombus canarium lives on muddy and sandy bottoms, grazing on algae and detritus. It is gonochoristic and sexually dimorphic, depending on internal fertilization for spawning. Larvae of this species spend several days as plankton, undergoing a series of transformations until they reach complete metamorphosis. The maximum life span is 2.0 to 2.5 years. Predators of this snail include carnivorous gastropods such as cone snails and volutes. It is also a prey species for vertebrates including macaques, and also humans, who consume the soft parts in a wide variety of dishes.

The dog conch is an economically important species in the Indo-West Pacific, and several studies indicate that it may be suffering population declines due to overfishing and overexploitation. Malacologists and ecologists have recommended a reduction in its exploitation rate; initiatives in Thailand are attempting to ensure the possibility of reproduction in young-adult individuals and manage the natural populations in general. L. canarium demonstrates the imposex phenomenon, but is resistant to sterility caused by it; therefore, this species might be useful as a bioindicator for organotin and lead pollution monitoring near Malaysian and Indonesian ports.

== Name ==
The English common name of L. canarium, "dog conch", is a calque of the Malay. In the Malay Peninsula, the species is known by the Malay name siput gonggong, where siput means "snail" and gonggong is an onomatopoetic word for a dog's bark. In some parts of the Visayas, in the Philippines, it is locally known as "bungkawil".

== Taxonomy ==
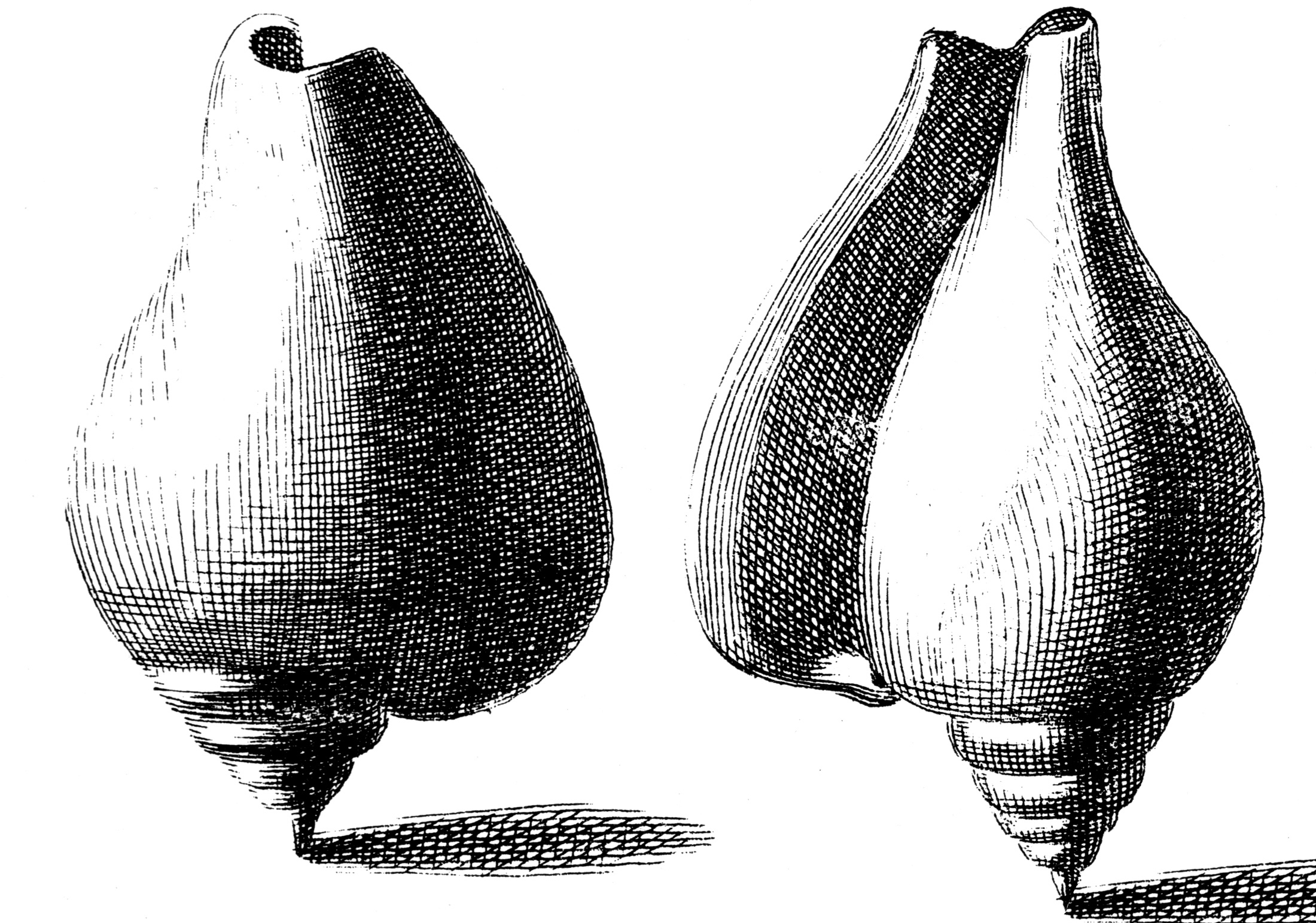
A 1742 illustration from Index Testarum Conchyliorum, showing abapertural (left) and apertural (right) views of an adult dog conch shell

The first published depictions of the shell of this species appeared in 1681 in the earliest book solely about sea shells, Recreatio mentis et oculi in observatione animalium testaceorum (Refreshment of the mind and the eye in the observation of shell-bearing animals) by Italian scholar Filippo Buonanni. The species was shown in the 1742 Index Testarum Conchyliorum, quae adservantur in Museo Nicolai Gualtieri (List of the shells of shellfish which are preserved in the museum of Niccolò Gualtieri) by Italian physician and malacologist Niccolò Gualtieri. In both books, the morphology of an adult shell was shown from different perspectives.

In 1758, the dog conch was formally described and named Strombus canarium by Swedish naturalist and taxonomist Carl Linnaeus, who originated the system of binomial nomenclature. The specific name of this taxon, canarium, is derived from the Latin canis (dog). The original description given by Linnaeus in his book, Systema Naturae, is in Latin: "S. testae labro rotundato brevi retuso, spiraque laevi." This can be translated as "Strombus with a shell having a retuse, short, rounded lip, and a smooth spire". Linnaeus did not mention a specific locality in his original description, giving only Eastern Asia as the area in which the species is found.

The taxon Laevistrombus was introduced in the literature as a subgenus of Strombus by Tetsuaki Kira (1955) in the third printing of the first edition of Coloured Illustrations of the Shells of Japan. It comprised two species, Strombus (Laevistrombus) canarium and Strombus (L.) isabella Lamarck, 1822. No type specimen was designated, and Kira gave no formal description or statement of differentiation, as required by the ICZN code to validate the name. In a later version of the book, Laevistrombus was elevated to genus level, but a description was still lacking. Rüdiger Bieler and Richard Petit (1996) considered it a nomen nudum, and the authorship was transferred to Robert Tucker Abbott (1960), who had provided a proper description and illustrations of Laevistrombus and specified a type species, Strombus canarium L., in the first volume of his monograph Indo-Pacific Mollusca. The currently accepted combination, Laevistrombus canarium, was proposed by Jack John Sepkoski Jr. (2002), who elevated Laevistrombus to genus level based on palaeontological data.

The synonyms are other binomial names that were given over time to this taxon by authors who were unaware that the specimens they were describing belonged to a species already described by Linnaeus; in some cases, local variations in colour and form may have misled these authors into thinking they had a different species. Strombus vanicorensis is a subsequent, changed spelling of Strombus vanikorensis by one of the original authors. Some disagreement is seen in the literature as to whether or not this taxon and the similar-looking Laevistrombus turturella are actually separate species. Leo Man In 'T Veld and Koenraad de Turck (1998) considered that L. canarium and L. turturella are distinct (yet sympatric) species, based mainly on the shell morphology and a radula comparison. However, when Zaidi Che Cob reviewed a number of Strombus species in 2009, examining both shell characters and anatomical data including details of the genitalia, operculum, and radula, he concluded that L. turturella was simply a morphotype, and therefore a synonym of L. canarium. In 2019, Maxwell et al. examined the early teleoconch (upper post-larval shell spiral) morphology of specimens of Laevistrombus species; they treated L. turturella as a valid species, and elevated L. guidoi, L. taeniata, and L. vanikorensis to full species status.

== Anatomy ==
=== Shell description ===
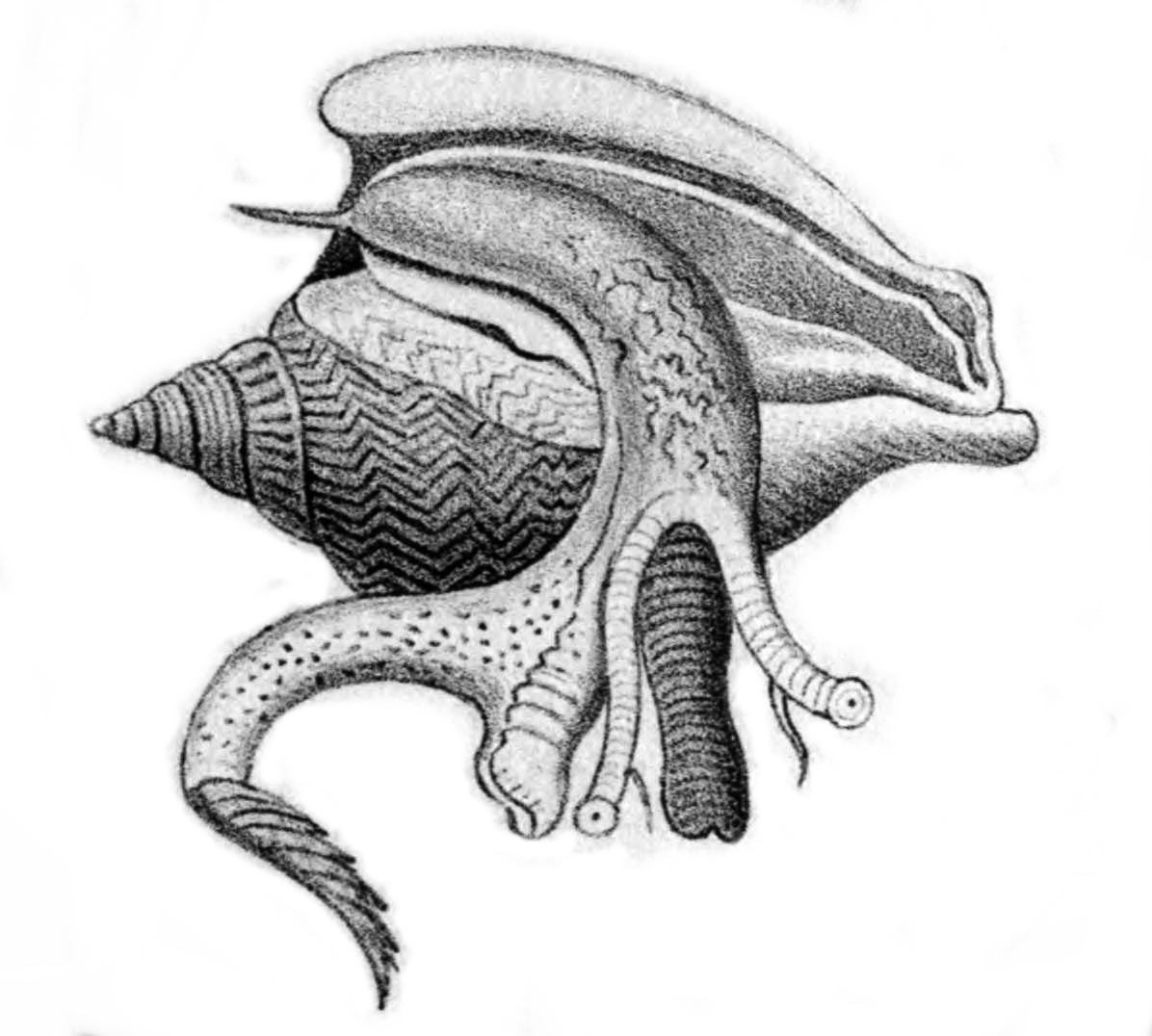
Illustration of the external morphology of L. canarium, from Manual of Conchology (1885)

Laevistrombus canarium has a heavy shell with a rounded outline. The shell length of adult specimens is from 29 mm (1.1 in) to 71 mm (2.8 in). The outer surface of the shell is almost completely smooth, except for barely visible spiral lines and occasional varices on the spire. Unlike species in the genus Strombus, the stromboid notch on the outer lip is inconspicuous. When a normal adult dextral shell of this species is viewed ventrally (with the anterior end pointing downwards), the stromboid notch can be observed to the right of the siphonal canal as a shallow, secondary anterior indentation in the lip. The siphonal canal itself is straight, short, and ample; the columella is smooth, without any folds. Adult specimens have a moderately flared, posteriorly protruding outer lip, which is considerably thickened and completely devoid of marginal spikes or plicae. The body whorl is roundly swollen at the shoulder, with a few anterior spiral grooves. The shell has a medium-to-high cone-shaped spire, with at least five delicately furrowed whorls.

Shell colour is variable, from golden yellow to light yellowish-brown to grey. The underside of the shell is rarely dark; more frequently it is paler than the top, or totally white. In all cases, the shell aperture is white. Mature specimens sometimes have a metallic-grey or golden-brown gloss on the margin of the outer lip and the callus. A zigzag network of darker lines is sometimes present on the outside of the shell. The periostracum, a layer of protein (conchiolin) that is the outermost part of the shell surface, is yellowish-brown. It is usually thick, reticulated (net-like), and fimbriated (fringed) over the suture. The corneous operculum is dark brown, and its shape is fairly typical of the family Strombidae: a slightly bent sickle, with seven or eight weak lateral serrations.

=== Soft parts ===
Females of L. canarium are generally larger (both shell and soft parts) than males, which is also the case in other strombid gastropods such as the spider conch (Harpago chiragra) and queen conch (Lobatus gigas). The external anatomy of the soft parts of this species is similar to that of the other members of the family; the animal has a long, extensible snout and thin eyestalks (also known as ommatophores), with well-developed lens eyes at the tips. Each eyestalk has a small sensory tentacle branching off near the end. The large foot of the animal is narrow and strong, able to perform the leaping form of locomotion that is also found in other species of the Strombidae (such as the queen conch).

== Phylogeny ==
- - - - - - - Strombus maculatus
            - Strombus mutabilis
          - - Strombus microurceus
            - Strombus labiatus
        - - - Strombus fragilis
            - Strombus urceus
          - Strombus dentatus
      - - - Strombus canarium
          - Strombus vittatus
        - Strombus epidromis
    - - Strombus fusiformis
      - Strombus haemastoma
  - Strombus wilsoni

Part of the phylogeny and relationships of Strombus species, according to Latiolais and colleagues (2006)

In 2006, Latiolais and colleagues proposed a cladogram that attempts to show the phylogenetic relationships of 34 species within the family Strombidae. The authors analysed 31 species in the genus Strombus (including S. canarium) and three species in the allied genus Lambis. The cladogram was based on DNA sequences of both nuclear histone H3 and mitochondrial cytochrome-c oxidase I protein-coding gene regions. In this proposed phylogeny S. (L.) canarium, Strombus vittatus (a synonym for Doxander vittatus) and Strombus epidromis (Labiostrombus epidromis) are closely related, and appear to share a common ancestor.

== Distribution ==
Laevistrombus canarium is native to the coastal waters of the Indo-Pacific region. Its westernmost distribution is India, including Andhra Pradesh, Tamil Nadu (Gulf of Mannar, Tuticorin, Rameswaram), and the Andamans. It occurs in Sri Lanka (Eastern province, Trincomalee), Thailand, Borneo (Brunei, Sabah), Indonesia (Moluccas, Saparua, Tanjungpinang, Batam, Bintan, Riau Islands) and the Philippines (Cebu Island, Polillo Islands, Palawan). It is also found further east in Melanesia, including Yos Sudarso Bay in New Guinea, Papua New Guinea, Malaita and Guadalcanal in the Solomon Islands, New Caledonia, Kioa Island in Fiji, and New Hebrides. The species is known to occur in Queensland, Australia, and north to Vietnam, Taiwan, and southern Japan.

Detailed information is available about its distribution in the Straits of Johor area and some other parts of Malaysia, where it has been reported from the Tanjung Adang Shoal, Merambong Shoal, Tanjung Bin, Tanjung Surat and Pasir Gogok in the Johor Straits; in Pulau Tinggi, Pulau Besar and Pulau Sibu, Port Dickson and Teluk Kemang in eastern Johor, and Negeri Sembilan, Pulau Pangkor, Pulau Langkawi, Cape Rachado, and Kilat in the western Johor Straits.

== Behaviour ==
Compared to most other gastropods, L. canarium has an unusual means of locomotion that is common only among the Strombidae. This curious series of maneuvers was originally described by American zoologist George Howard Parker in 1922. The animal initially fixes the posterior end of the foot by thrusting the point of its sickle-shaped operculum into the substrate. Then, it extends its foot forward, lifting the shell and throws it ahead in a motion that has been described as "leaping".

Burrowing behaviour, in which an individual sinks itself entirely (or partially) into the substrate, is frequent among strombid gastropods. The burrowing behaviour of L. canarium consists of a series of movements characteristic of the species. There are three consecutive movements: first is probing, where the animal pushes the anterior portion of the foot into the substrate to gain a hold; next is shovelling, where it pushes the substrate with its long, extensible proboscis. Retraction is the final movement, where it moves the shell along an anterior-posterior axis to settle the substrate around it. Once burrowed, part of the dorsal shell is usually still visible (although the ventral surface and the animal's soft parts are buried).

The escape response in gastropods—the perception of stimuli (for example, the presence of a predator nearby) and a subsequent escape motion—is a frequent target of behavioural studies. In gastropods, the perception of environmental chemical stimuli originating, for example, from food or other organisms is possibly mediated by sensory organs such as the osphradium. In the case of L. canarium, the perception of a predator can occur through chemoreception or vision (a well-developed sense in strombid gastropods). The presence of a predator can significantly alter the movement pattern of L. canarium, inducing an increase in the frequency of leaps.

== Ecology ==
The dog conch lives on muddy sand bottoms among algae and seagrass beds on insular and continental shores. It usually prefers major islands and continental coasts rather than the shores of small islands, although this is not an absolute rule. L. canarium prefers areas of mixed seagrasses (with a predominance of Halophila), and also prefers sediment with high levels of organic matter. This conch avoids environments with a high density of Enhalus acoroides, a large seagrass native to coastal waters of the Indo-Pacific. The dog conch can be found in littoral and sublittoral zones, from shallow water to a depth of 55 m (180 ft). It is normally found in large colonies, and is usually abundant wherever it occurs.

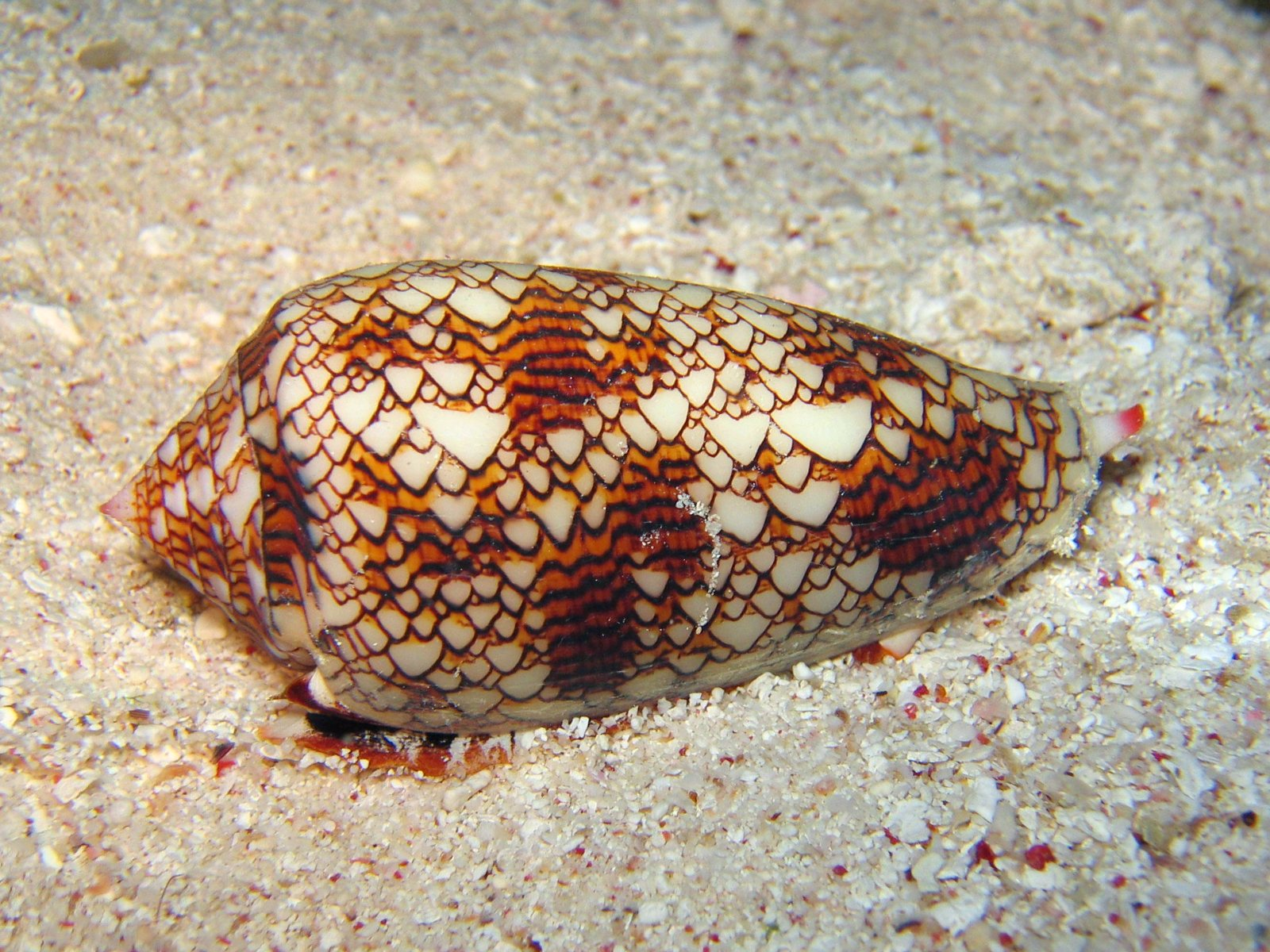
One known predator of the dog conch is the cloth-of-gold cone snail, Conus textile.

During the 19th century, strombid gastropods were believed to be carnivores. This erroneous conception was based on the writings of French naturalist Jean Baptiste Lamarck, whose classification scheme grouped strombids with carnivorous sea snails. Subsequent studies have refuted the concept, proving beyond doubt that strombid gastropods are herbivorous animals. In common with other Strombidae, Laevistrombus canarium is known to be a herbivore, feeding on algae and occasionally detritus.

Predators of L. canarium include carnivorous marine gastropods, such as cone snail (Conus textile). The dog conch is also preyed upon by vertebrates. These include the crab-eating macaque, Macaca fascicularis, an opportunistic predator that scours intertidal environments. Humans are one of the dog conch's main predators, subjecting the species to intensive fishing and exploitation. Empty shells of L. canarium are often occupied by the land hermit crab Coenobita violascens.

L. canarium is often parasitized by protists of the phylum Apicomplexa, which are common mollusk parasites. The coccidian parasites that infect L. canarium belong to the genus Pseudoklossia. These spore-forming, single-celled microorganisms infest the hosts' kidney cells, and the digestive ducts and tubules of its digestive gland.

=== Life cycle ===
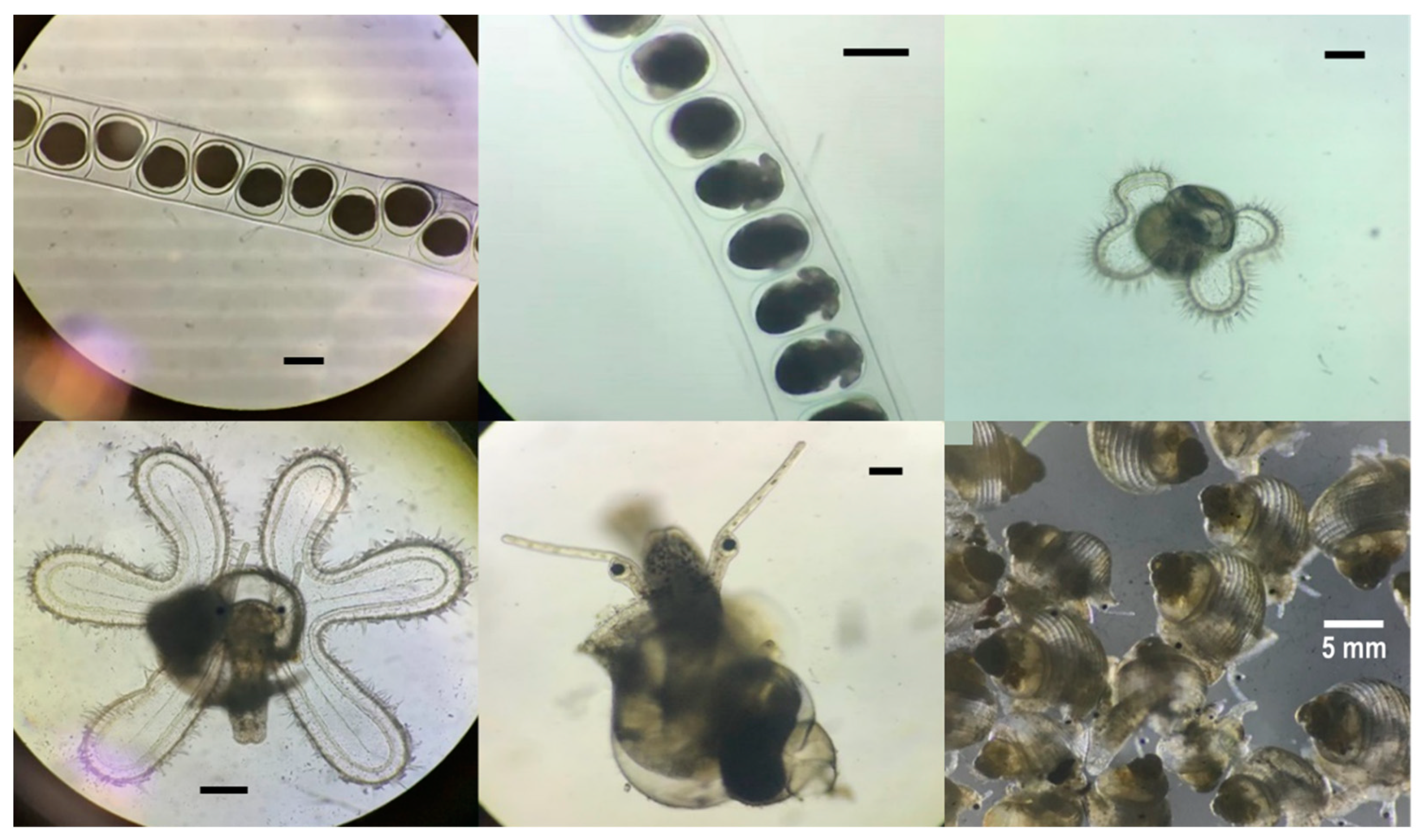
Different development stages of Laevistrombus canarium: Tubular structure with egg capsules (top left); embryo (top center); 4-lobed stage II veliger (top right); 6-lobed stage IV veliger (bottom left); newly metamorphosed juvenile (bottom center) scale bars = 100 μm; 10 mm juveniles (bottom right).

L. canarium is gonochoristic, which means that each individual animal is distinctly male or female. The breeding season starts in May and continues until September. After internal fertilization the female produces and spawns a long, gelatinous tubular structure containing multiple eggs. This structure then coils itself and compacts, forming a creamy-white egg mass. Each egg mass may contain 50,000–70,000 eggs; In about 110–130 hours the embryo of L. canarium grows from a single cell to a veliger (a larval form common to marine and fresh-water gastropod and bivalve mollusks) and then hatches. The hatching process takes 12–15 hours. After hatching, the larvae can be assigned to four distinct developmental stages throughout their short planktonic lives (based on morphological features and other characteristics). Usually, larvae up to 3 days old are stage I veligers; 4– to 8-day-old larvae are stage II; 9– to 16-day-old larvae are stage III, and larvae from 17 days to metamorphosis are stage IV. L. canarium larvae develop faster compared to other species in the same family, including the West Indian fighting conch (Strombus pugilis) and the milk conch (Lobatus costatus). Larval development may be highly influenced by environmental conditions, such as temperature and the quality and availability of food. Metamorphosis in L. canarium can be recognised by loss of the larval velar lobes and the development of the typical leaping motion of juvenile true conches.

== Human uses and conservation measures ==
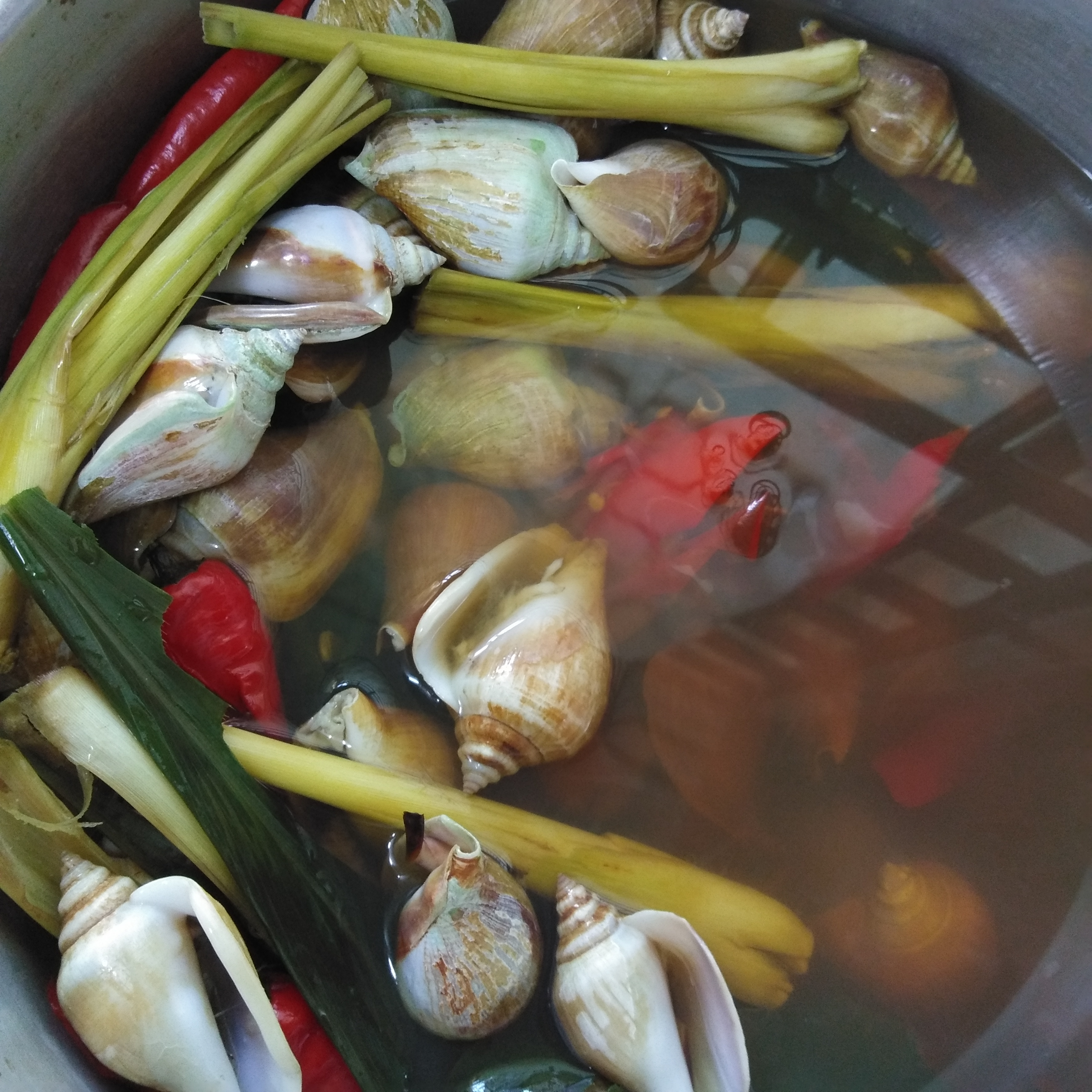
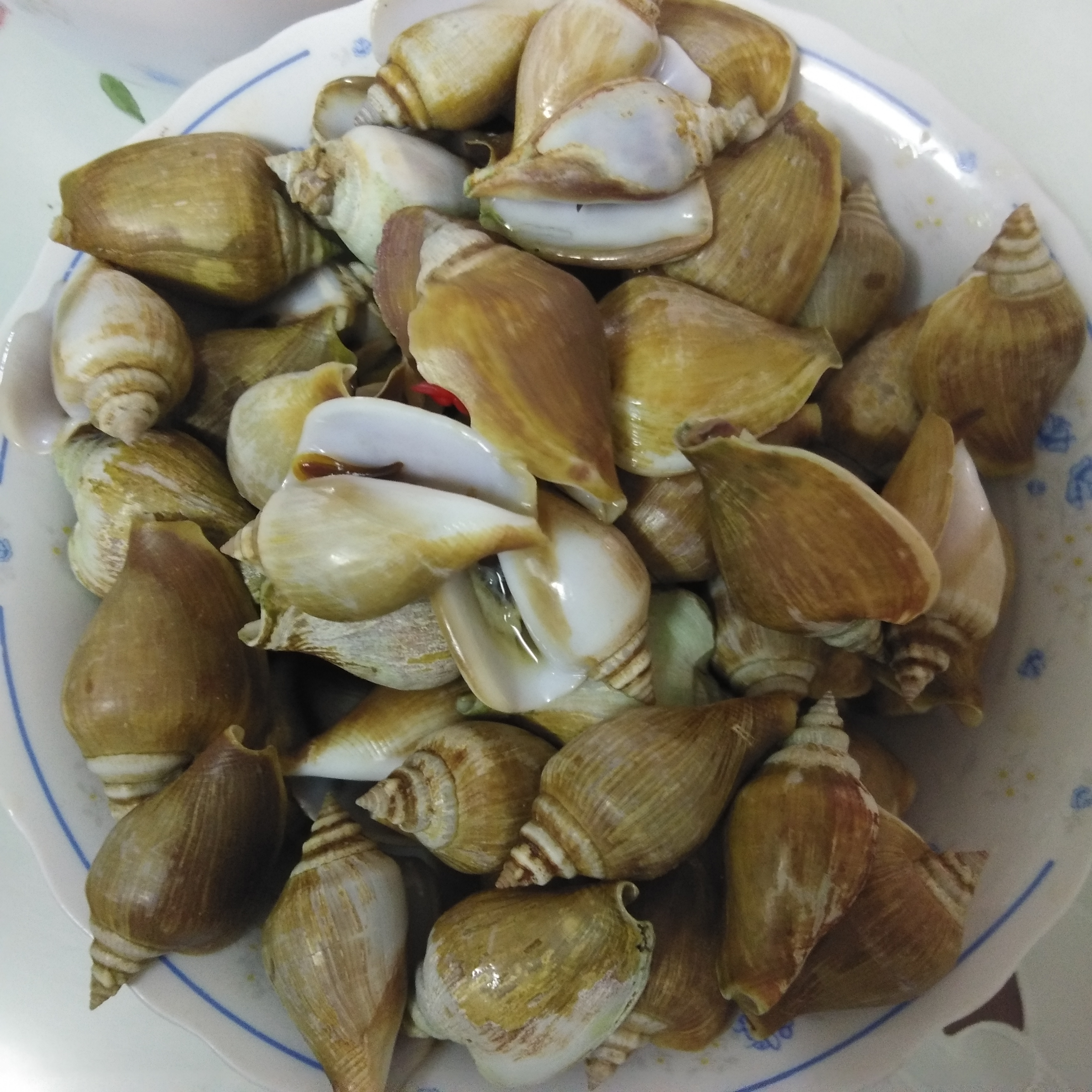
L. canarium is a local delicacy served in many parts of Southeast Asia.

The flesh of Laevistrombus canarium is edible and widely consumed. This species holds significant economic importance and is considered one of the most valuable fishery resources in many coastal regions of Southeast Asia. It is a staple food for locals living along the seashore, being fished in many Southeast Asian countries. Despite their ornamental value, L. canarium shells are traditionally used by local fishermen as sinkers for fishing nets. Studies from 2008 to 2009 indicate that L. canarium has been overexploited and overfished in many areas; malacologists and ecologists have recommended reducing exploitation rates to maintain its availability as a natural resource. Finding large dog-conch individuals has become an increasingly difficult task in several regions where this species occurs. Initiatives in the southern Thailand province of Phuket intend to increase depleted natural stocks of L. canarium by reintroducing cultured animals in local seagrass beds. Fishermen are encouraged not to collect younger, smaller individuals that have not yet reproduced. In a more recent effort to reduce the impact on naturally occurring populations of the species, researchers from Taiwan have been developing aquaculture methods aimed at mass-producing it for human consumption.

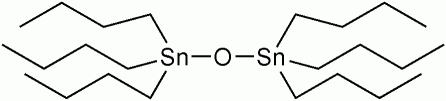
Structural diagram of a tributyltin (TBT) compound. Organic tin compounds such as TBT can cause imposex in gastropods.

Imposex has been detected in L. canarium. Imposex is the development of male sex organs in female animals exposed to man-made organic tin compounds, such as tributyltin (TBT). It has negative consequences for several species of sea snails, ranging from sterility in some individuals to the extinction of entire populations. Tin compounds are biocidal antifouling agents mixed into paints to prevent marine encrustations on boats and ships. High concentrations of these compounds are commonly present in seawater near shipyards and docking areas, exposing nearby marine life to harmful effects. In a 2011 paper, Cob and colleagues found that imposex rates are high in dog conch populations near Malaysian ports; however, the researchers could not detect any cases of sterility in affected females. The authors concluded that females of L. canarium often develop a penis when seawater contains organotin compounds, but the phenomenon does not cause sterility in this species. The ability of the dog conch to survive despite imposex makes this species a suitable local bioindicator for organotin pollution. Recent studies have shown that L. canarium is capable of bioaccumulating heavy metals such as lead (Pb) in its tissues, particularly in coastal areas exposed to intensive human activities. Research conducted in Madong waters, Tanjung Pinang, in Indonesia, reported the accumulation of lead in the tissues of this species. These findings demonstrate that L. canarium may serve as a useful bioindicator for monitoring heavy metal pollution in tropical marine environments.

== See also ==
- List of species in the genus Laevistrombus
