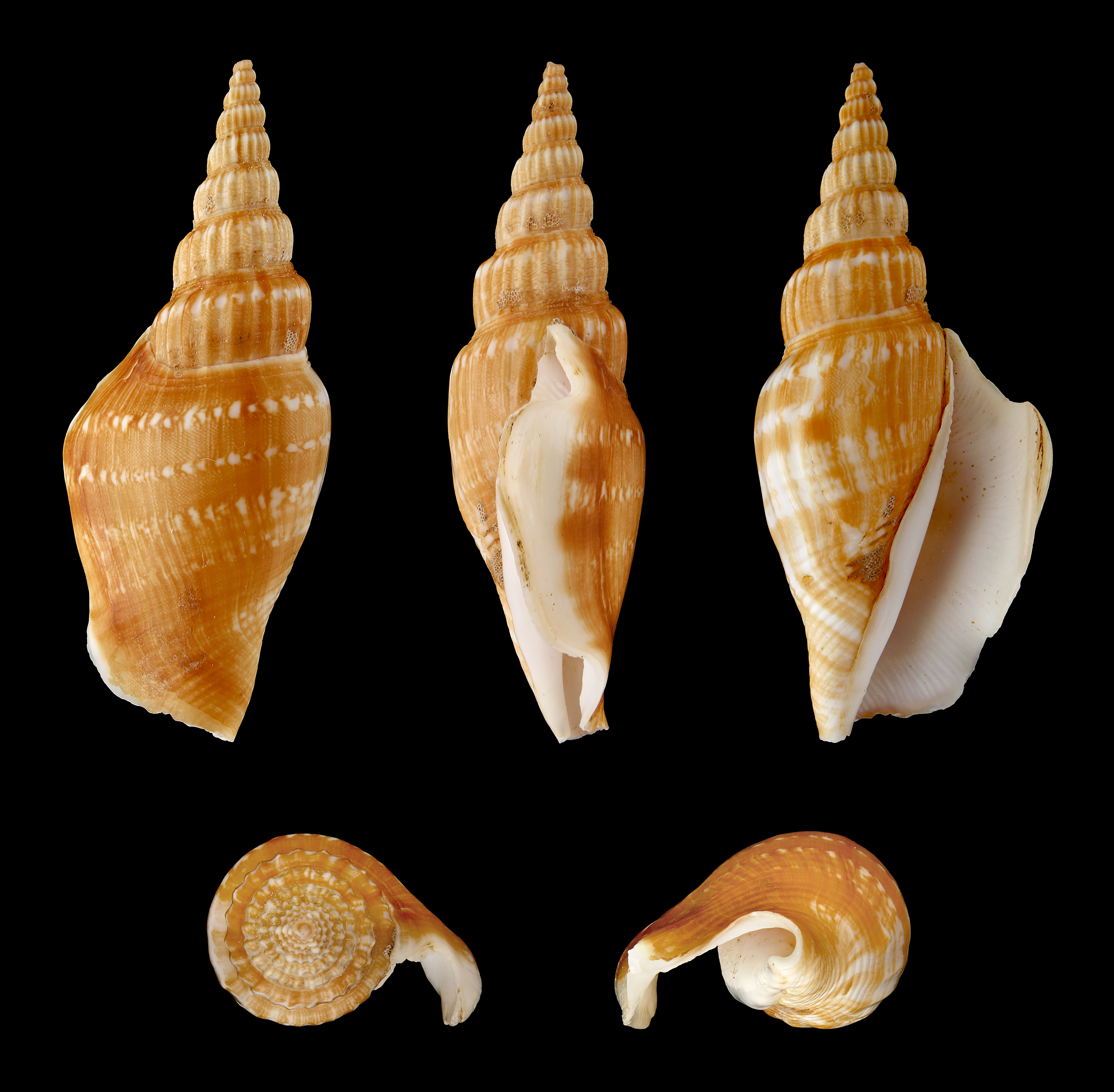
- Five views of a shell of Doxander vittatus

Scientific classification
- Kingdom: Animalia
- Phylum: Mollusca
- Class: Gastropoda
- Subclass: Caenogastropoda
- Order: Littorinimorpha
- Family: Strombidae
- Genus: Doxander
- Species: D. vittatus

Binomial name
- Doxander vittatus (Linnaeus, 1758)

Synonyms
- Doxander vittatus australis Schröter, 1805; Rostellaria sinuata Perry, 1811; Strombus australis Schröter, 1805; Strombus elatus Anton, 1839; Strombus sulcatus Holten, 1802; Strombus vittatus Linnaeus, 1758 (basionym)

= Doxander vittatus =

Species of gastropod

Doxander vittatus, the vitate snail, is a species of medium-sized sea snail, a marine gastropod mollusk in the family Strombidae, the true conchs.

== Subspecies ==
There are five subspecies :

- Doxander vittatus vittatus (Linnaeus, 1758)
- Doxander vittatus apicatus (Man in 't Veld & Visser, 1993)
- Doxander vittatus entropi (Man in 't Veld & Visser, 1993)
- Doxander vittatus japonicus (Reeve, 1851)
- Doxander vittatus campbelli (Campbelli, Griffith & Pidgeon, 1834)

== Distribution ==
This species occurs in the Indo-Pacific off Fiji and also in the South China Sea.

== Description ==
The adult shell size varies between 35 mm and 100 mm.

== Phylogeny ==
- - - - - - - Strombus maculatus
            - Strombus mutabilis
          - - Strombus microurceus
            - Strombus labiatus
        - - - Strombus fragilis
            - Strombus urceus
          - Strombus dentatus
      - - - Strombus canarium
          - Strombus vittatus
        - Strombus epidromis
    - - Strombus fusiformis
      - Strombus haemastoma
  - Strombus wilsoni

Part of the phylogeny and relationships of Strombus species, according to Latiolais et al. (2006)

In 2006, Latiolais and colleagues proposed a cladogram that attempts to show the phylogenetic relationships of 34 species within the family Strombidae. The authors analysed 31 species in the genus Strombus including Doxander vittatus (referred to as Strombus vittatus in their analysis), and three species in the allied genus Lambis. The cladogram was based on DNA sequences of both nuclear histone H3 and mitochondrial cytochrome-c oxidase I (COI) protein-coding gene regions. In this proposed phylogeny, Strombus vittatus, Strombus canarium (= Laevistrombus canarium) and Strombus epidromis (= Labiostrombus epidromis) are closely related and appear to share a common ancestor.
