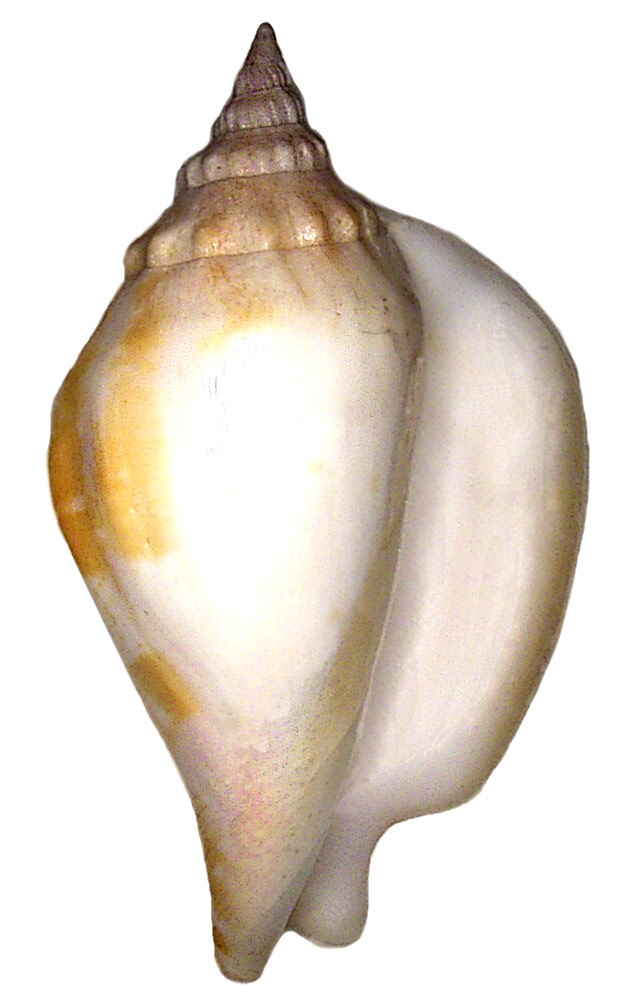

Scientific classification
- Kingdom: Animalia
- Phylum: Mollusca
- Class: Gastropoda
- Subclass: Caenogastropoda
- Order: Littorinimorpha
- Family: Strombidae
- Genus: Labiostrombus
- Species: L. epidromis

Binomial name
- Labiostrombus epidromis (Linnaeus, 1758)

Synonyms
- Strombus epidromis Linnaeus, 1758

= Labiostrombus epidromis =

Species of gastropod

Labiostrombus epidromis, common name the swan conch, is a species of sea snail, a marine gastropod mollusc in the family Strombidae, the true conchs.

== Description ==
The typical size of the adult shell varies between 50 and 95 mm.

== Distribution ==
This marine species occurs in the Central Indo-West Pacific,;off the Ryukyus, Japan, to Australia (Northern Territory, Queensland, Western Australia), and New Caledonia

== Phylogeny ==
- - - - - - - Strombus maculatus
            - Strombus mutabilis
          - - Strombus microurceus
            - Strombus labiatus
        - - - Strombus fragilis
            - Strombus urceus
          - Strombus dentatus
      - - - Strombus canarium
          - Strombus vittatus
        - Strombus epidromis
    - - Strombus fusiformis
      - Strombus haemastoma
  - Strombus wilsoni

Part of the phylogeny and relationships of Strombus species, according to Latiolais et al. (2006)

In 2006, Latiolais and colleagues proposed a cladogram that attempts to show the phylogenetic relationships of 34 species within the family Strombidae. The authors analysed 31 species in the genus Strombus including Labiostrombus epidromis (referred to as Strombus epidromis in their analysis), and three species in the allied genus Lambis. The cladogram was based on DNA sequences of both nuclear histone H3 and mitochondrial cytochrome-c oxidase I (COI) protein-coding gene regions. In this proposed phylogeny, Strombus epidromis (= Labiostrombus epidromis), Strombus vittatus (= Doxander vittatus) and Strombus canarium (= Laevistrombus canarium) are closely related and appear to share a common ancestor.

== Bibliography ==
- Cotton, B.C. 1953. No. 3. Strombidae. Adelaide : Royal Society of South Australia, Malacological Section 4 pp. 1 pl. [
- Abbott, R.T. 1960. The genus Strombus in the Indo-Pacific. Indo-Pacific Mollusca 1(2): 33-146
- Wilson, B. 1993. Australian Marine Shells. Prosobranch Gastropods. Kallaroo, Western Australia : Odyssey Publishing Vol. 1 408 pp.
- Kreipl, K. & Poppe, G.T. 1999. A Conchological Iconography: The Family Strombidae. Hackenheim, Germany : ConchBooks 59 pp., 130 pls.
- Raven, H 2002. Notes on molluscs from NW Borneo. 1. Stromboidea (Gastropoda, Strombidae, Rostellariidae, Seraphidae). Vita Malacologica 1: 3-32
