= Maculastrombus mutabilis =

- Canarium mutabile f zebriolatus

Scientific classification
- Kingdom: Animalia
- Phylum: Mollusca
- Class: Gastropoda
- Subclass: Caenogastropoda
- Order: Littorinimorpha
- Family: Strombidae
- Genus: Maculastrombus
- Species: M. mutabilis

Binomial name
- Maculastrombus mutabilis (Swainson, 1821)

Synonyms
- Canarium (Conundrum) mutabile (Swainson, 1821) superseded combination; Canarium mutabile (Swainson, 1821) superseded combination; Strombus (Canarium) mutabilis f. rufescens Prelle, 2006 (Unavailable name below the species-group); Strombus epimellus Duclos, P.L. in Chenu, J.C., 1844; Strombus flammeus Link, H.F., 1807; Strombus epimellus Duclos in Chenu, 1844; Strombus floridus f. zebriolatus Adam & Leloup, 1938; Strombus flosculosus Mörch, 1852; Strombus mutabilis Swainson, 1821 (basionym)

Species of gastropod

Maculastrombus mutabilis (Swainson, 1821), commonly known as the variable stromb, is a species of sea snail, a marine gastropod mollusc in the family Strombidae, the true conchs.

It was previously placed in the genera Strombus and Canarium.

Subspecies

- Maculastrombus mutabilis arabicus Liverani, 2025
- Maculastrombus mutabilis mutabilis (Swainson, 1821)

== Description ==
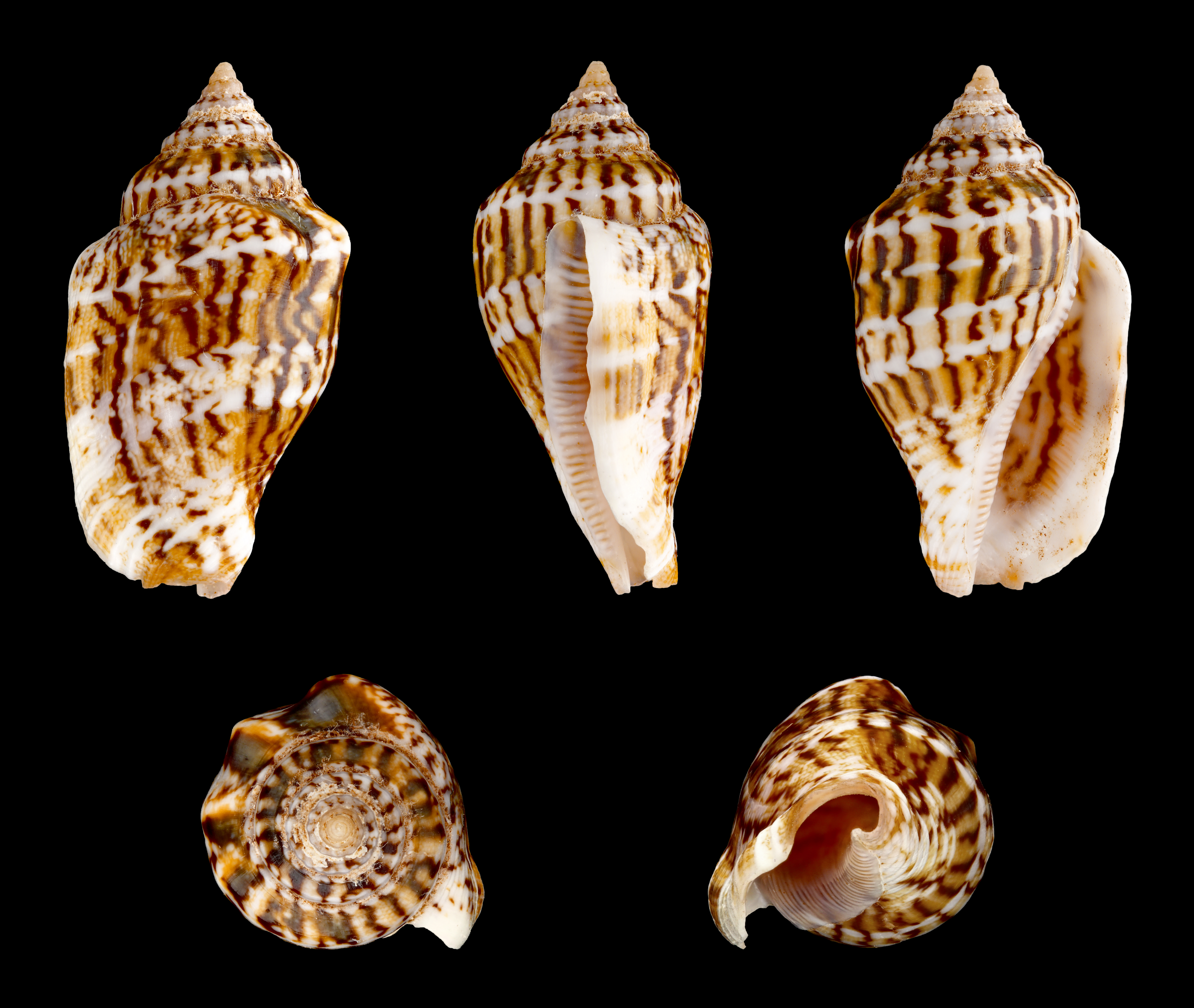
forma zebriolatus

The shell size varies between 15 mm and 45 mm.

== Distribution ==
This species is distributed in the Red Sea, in the Indian Ocean along Aldabra, the Chagos Atoll, the Comores, Djibouti; the East Coast of South Africa; Eritrea; Kenya ; Madagascar; the Mascarene Basin, Mauritius, Mozambique; Réunion, the Seychelles, Somalia, Tanzania; the Mediterranean Sea; the Pacific Ocean along the Philippines.

== Phylogeny ==
- - - - - - - Strombus maculatus
            - Strombus mutabilis
          - - Strombus microurceus
            - Strombus labiatus
        - - - Strombus fragilis
            - Strombus urceus
          - Strombus dentatus
      - - - Strombus canarium
          - Strombus vittatus
        - Strombus epidromis
    - - Strombus fusiformis
      - Strombus haemastoma
  - Strombus wilsoni

Part of the phylogeny and relationships of Strombus species, according to Latiolais et al. (2006)

In 2006, Latiolais and colleagues proposed a cladogram that attempts to show the phylogenetic relationships of 34 species within the family Strombidae. The authors analysed 31 species in the genus Strombus including Canarium mutabile (referred to as Strombus mutabilis in their analysis), and three species in the allied genus Lambis. The cladogram was based on DNA sequences of both nuclear histone H3 and mitochondrial cytochrome-c oxidase I (COI) protein-coding gene regions. In this proposed phylogeny, Strombus mutabilis (=Canarium mutabile) and Strombus maculatus are closely related and appear to share a common ancestor.
