= Fusistrombus fusiformis =

Scientific classification
- Kingdom: Animalia
- Phylum: Mollusca
- Class: Gastropoda
- Subclass: Caenogastropoda
- Order: Littorinimorpha
- Family: Strombidae
- Genus: Fusistrombus
- Species: F. fusiformis

Binomial name
- Fusistrombus fusiformis G.B. Sowerby II, 1842

Synonyms
- Canarium fusiforme (G. B. Sowerby II, 1842) superseded combination; Neostrombus fusiformis (G. B. Sowerby II, 1842) superseded combination; Strombus (Canarium) fusiformis G. B. Sowerby II, 1842 superseded combination; Strombus (Fusistrombus) fusiformis G. B. Sowerby II, 1842; Strombus fusiformis G. B. Sowerby II, 1842 · unaccepted (original combination)

Species of gastropod

Fusistrombus fusiformis is a species of sea snail, a marine gastropod mollusc in the family Strombidae, the true conchs.

== Phylogeny ==
- - - - - - - Strombus maculatus
            - Strombus mutabilis
          - - Strombus microurceus
            - Strombus labiatus
        - - - Strombus fragilis
            - Strombus urceus
          - Strombus dentatus
      - - - Strombus canarium
          - Strombus vittatus
        - Strombus epidromis
    - - Strombus fusiformis
      - Strombus haemastoma
  - Strombus wilsoni

Part of the phylogeny and relationships of Strombus species, according to Latiolais et al. (2006)

In 2006, Latiolais and colleagues proposed a cladogram that attempts to show the phylogenetic relationships of 34 species within the family Strombidae. The authors analysed 31 species in the genus Strombus including Canarium fusiforme (referred to as Strombus fusiformis in their analysis), and three species in the allied genus Lambis. The cladogram was based on DNA sequences of both nuclear histone H3 and mitochondrial cytochrome-c oxidase I (COI) protein-coding gene regions. In this proposed phylogeny, Strombus haemastoma (= Canarium haemastoma) and Strombus fusiformis are closely related and appear to share a common ancestor.

== Description ==
(Original description in Latin) The shell is fusiform, smooth, and somewhat truncated anteriorly. The spire is conical, with whorls that bear a single groove near the suture. The body whorl is striated at the margin and somewhat gibbous on the back. The aperture is narrowed. The inner lips are striated and taper posteriorly into a siphonal canal that descends along the spire. The outer lip is obliquely truncated, and there is a small anterior sinus.

== Distribution ==
This marine species occurs in the Indian Ocean off Africa.
