= Maculastrombus microurceus =

Scientific classification
- Kingdom: Animalia
- Phylum: Mollusca
- Class: Gastropoda
- Subclass: Caenogastropoda
- Order: Littorinimorpha
- Family: Strombidae
- Genus: Maculastrombus
- Species: M. microurceus

Binomial name
- Maculastrombus microurceus Kira, 1959

Synonyms
- Canarium (Conundrum) microurceus Kira, 1959 superseded combination; Canarium microurceum Kira, 1959 incorrect grammatical agreement of specific epithet; Canarium microurceus Kira, 1959 superseded combination; Strombus (Canarium) microurceus (Kira, 1959); Strombus microurceus (Kira, 1959)

Species of gastropod

Maculastrombus microurceus is a species of sea snail, a marine gastropod mollusc in the family Strombidae, the true conchs.

== Phylogeny ==
- - - - - - - Strombus maculatus
            - Strombus mutabilis
          - - Strombus microurceus
            - Strombus labiatus
        - - - Strombus fragilis
            - Strombus urceus
          - Strombus dentatus
      - - - Strombus canarium
          - Strombus vittatus
        - Strombus epidromis
    - - Strombus fusiformis
      - Strombus haemastoma
  - Strombus wilsoni

Part of the phylogeny and relationships of Strombus species, according to Latiolais et al. (2006)

In 2006, Latiolais and colleagues proposed a cladogram that attempts to show the phylogenetic relationships of 34 species within the family Strombidae. The authors analysed 31 species in the genus Strombus including Canarium microurceus (referred to as Strombus microurceus in their analysis), and three species in the allied genus Lambis. The cladogram was based on DNA sequences of both nuclear histone H3 and mitochondrial cytochrome-c oxidase I (COI) protein-coding gene regions. In this proposed phylogeny, Strombus labiatus (= Canarium labiatum) and Strombus microurceus are closely related and appear to share a common ancestor.

== Distribution ==
This marine species occurs in the Indo-West Pacific and off Australia (New South Wales, Queensland).
