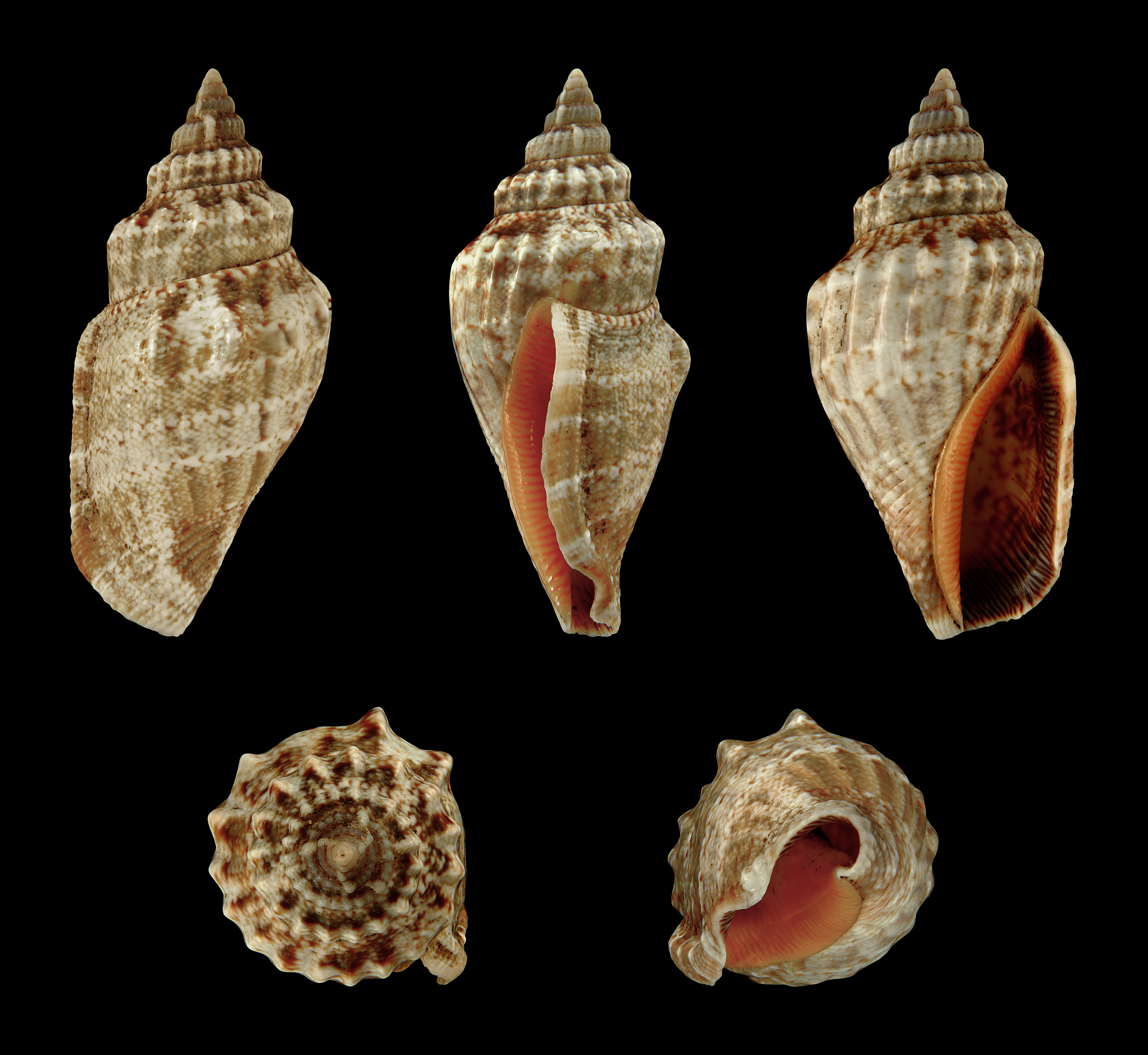
- Five views of a shell of Canarium labiatum

Scientific classification
- Kingdom: Animalia
- Phylum: Mollusca
- Class: Gastropoda
- Subclass: Caenogastropoda
- Order: Littorinimorpha
- Family: Strombidae
- Genus: Canarium
- Species: C. labiatum

Binomial name
- Canarium labiatum (Röding, 1798)

Synonyms
- Canarium otiolum Iredale, 1931; Lambis labiata Röding, 1798 (basionym); Lambis reticulata Link, 1807 (uncertain synonym); Strombus corrugatus Adams, A. & L.A. Reeve, 1850; Strombus labiatus (Röding, 1798); Strombus plicatus Lamarck, 1816

= Canarium labiatum =

Species of gastropod

Canarium labiatum, the Samar conch, is a species of sea snail, a marine gastropod mollusk in the family Strombidae, the true conchs.

== Description ==
The shell size varies between 20 mm and 50 mm.

Described by Tom Iredale as Canarium otiolum in 1931:

The shell is small, with an exsert, varicose spire. The outer lip is slightly expanded and sinuate. The colour of the dead shell is cream, variously banded with pale brown.

Six adult whorls follow a smooth, bulbous protoconch that is tipped with a mucro. The adult whorls are regularly marked by four varices, except for the body whorl, which shows none; however, its outer lip is thickened and slightly varicose. Internally, the outer lip is finely ridged, while the inner lip is smooth.

Fourteen longitudinal ribs appear on the shoulder of the body whorl but soon become obsolete on the body. A small sutural roll follows, and the sutures are accompanied by concentric ridges. These ridges are indistinct on the face of the body whorl but become more pronounced towards the base. On the penultimate whorl, two or three longitudinal ribs appear irregularly between each varix. The concentric lirae are less pronounced there and become still less distinct towards the apex.

The shell measures 22 mm in length and 10 mm in breadth.

== Distribution ==
This species is distributed in the Indian Ocean along Aldabra, Chagos and Tanzania; in the Western Pacific along Southeast Australia.

== Phylogeny ==
- - - - - - - Strombus maculatus
            - Strombus mutabilis
          - - Strombus microurceus
            - Strombus labiatus
        - - - Strombus fragilis
            - Strombus urceus
          - Strombus dentatus
      - - - Strombus canarium
          - Strombus vittatus
        - Strombus epidromis
    - - Strombus fusiformis
      - Strombus haemastoma
  - Strombus wilsoni

Part of the phylogeny and relationships of Strombus species, according to Latiolais et al. (2006)

In the year 2006, colleagues proposed a cladogram that attempts to show the phylogenetic relationships of 34 species within the family Strombidae. The authors analysed 31 species in the genus Strombus including Canarium labiatum (referred to as Strombus labiatus in their analysis), and three species in the allied genus Lambis. The cladogram was based on DNA sequences of both nuclear histone H3 and mitochondrial cytochrome-c oxidase I (COI) protein-coding gene regions. In this proposed phylogeny, Strombus labiatus (= Canarium labiatum) and Strombus microurceus are closely related and appear to share a common ancestor.
