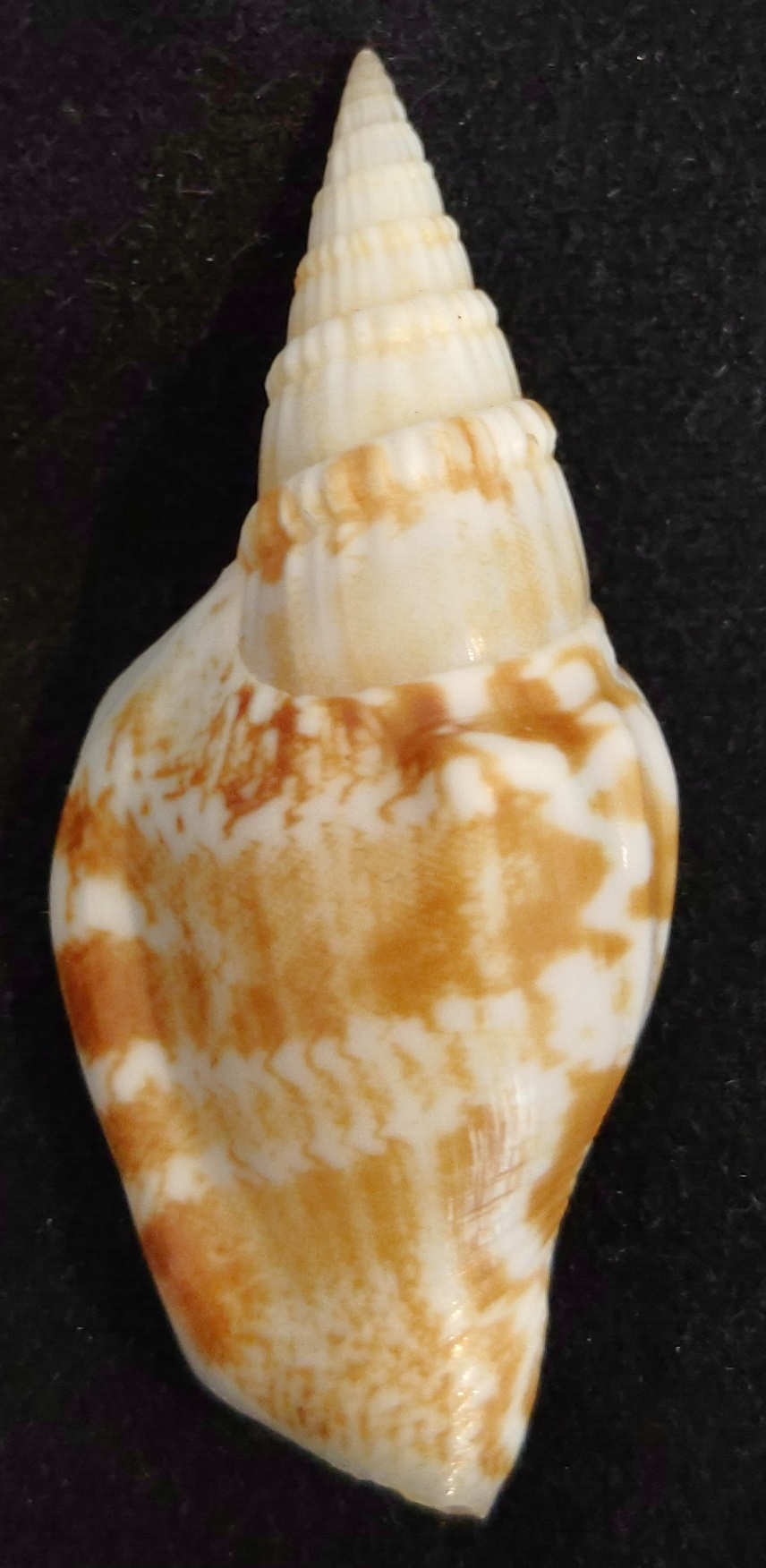
- Doxander campbelli

Scientific classification
- Kingdom: Animalia
- Phylum: Mollusca
- Class: Gastropoda
- Subclass: Caenogastropoda
- Order: Littorinimorpha
- Family: Strombidae
- Genus: Doxander
- Species: D. campbelli

Binomial name
- Doxander campbelli (Griffith & Pidgeon, 1834)

Synonyms
- Strombus campbelli Griffith & Pidgeon, 1834 (original combination); Alaba sulcata Watson, 1886

= Doxander campbelli =

Species of gastropod

Doxander campbelli, common name the Campbell's stromb, is a species of medium-sized sea snail, a marine gastropod mollusk in the family Strombidae, the true conchs.

== Distribution ==
The geograpic distribution of Doxander campbelli is localized primarily within ocean waters surrounding Australia. The recorded boundaries of its regional range span across Northwest Australia down along the coast into New South Wales. Notable coastal localities in eastern Queensland where specimens are frequently documented include Dingo Beach and Shelly Beach. Within these environments, the species exhibits a specific microhabitat preference, being commonly found buried or moving on top of sandy substrates during extreme low tide conditions.

== Description ==
The adult shell length of Doxander campbelli is typically between 2mm and 75mm. The shell is shaped like a spindle, meaning it is wide in the middle and grows narrow and pointed at both ends. Its surface is mostly smooth with a tall, pointed spire at the top. The shell is white with reddish-brown patterns and narrow white bands running across it. The outer edge of the shell flares out like a small wing, and the smooth inside opening of the shell exhibits a polished ivory-white color.
