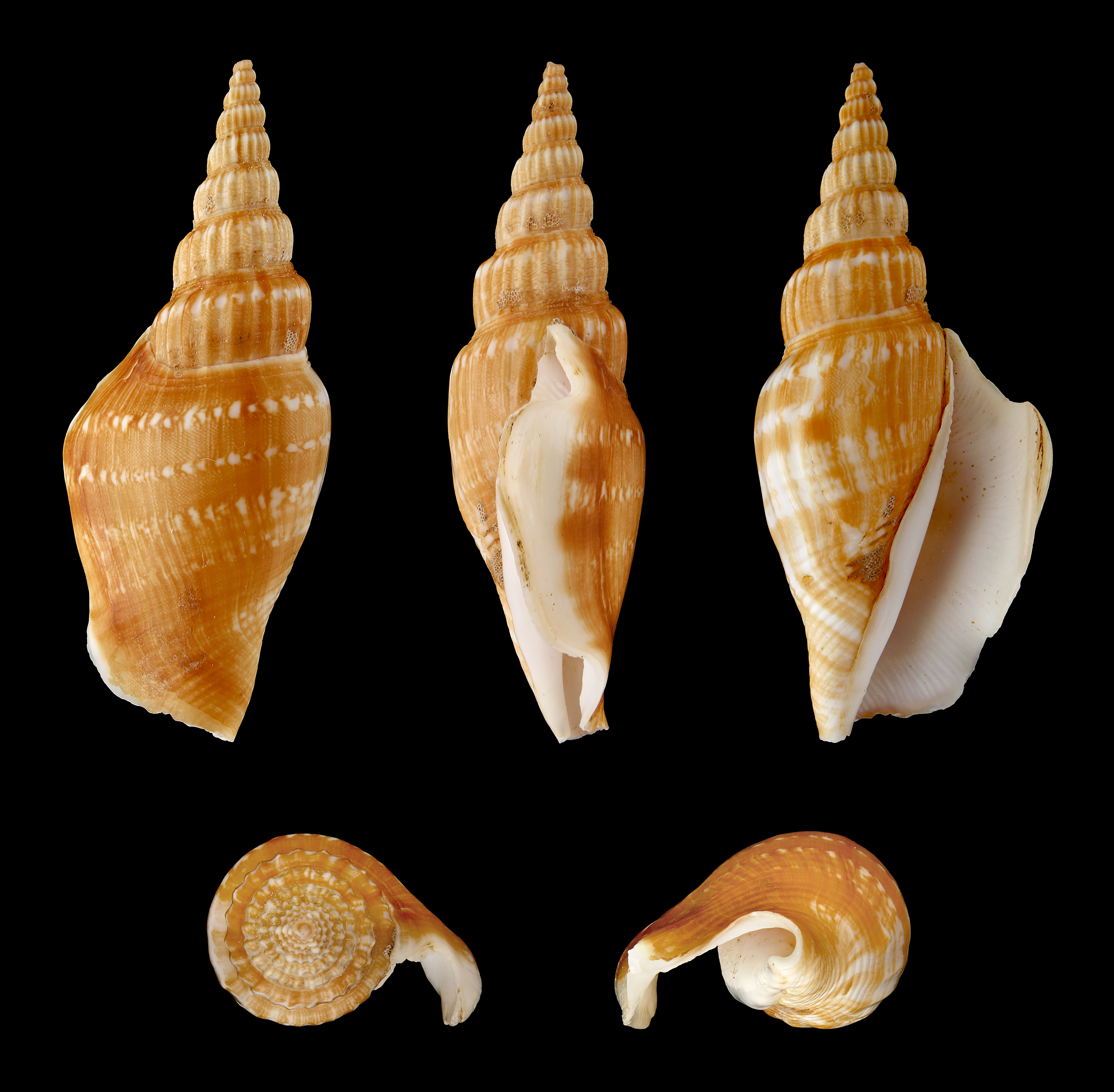
- Five views of a shell of Doxander vittatus

Scientific classification
- Kingdom: Animalia
- Phylum: Mollusca
- Class: Gastropoda
- Subclass: Caenogastropoda
- Order: Littorinimorpha
- Superfamily: Stromboidea
- Family: Strombidae
- Genus: Doxander; Wenz, 1940

Type species
- Strombus vittatus Linnaeus, 1758

Synonyms
- Strombus (Doxander) Wenz, 1940

= Doxander =

Genus of gastropods

Doxander is a genus of sea snails, marine gastropod mollusks in the family Strombidae, the true conchs.

The name Doxander was originally given by Iredale to this genus in 1931. But since he did not provide a description, the name Doxander, Iredale, 1931 is no longer available under Art. 13.1 of the ICZN Code.

== Species ==
Species within the genus Doxander include:

- Doxander campbelli (Griffith & Pidgeon, 1834)
- Doxander entropi (Man in 't Veld & Visser, 1993)
- Doxander japonicus (Reeve, 1851)
- Doxander operosus (Röding, 1798)
- Doxander queenslandicus S. J. Maxwell, 2022
- Doxander vittatus (Linnaeus, 1758)

Species brought into synonymy

- Doxander apicatus (Man in't Veld, L.A. & G.J. Visser, 1993): synonym of Doxander operosus (Röding, 1798)
