= Imposex =

Disorder of sea snails

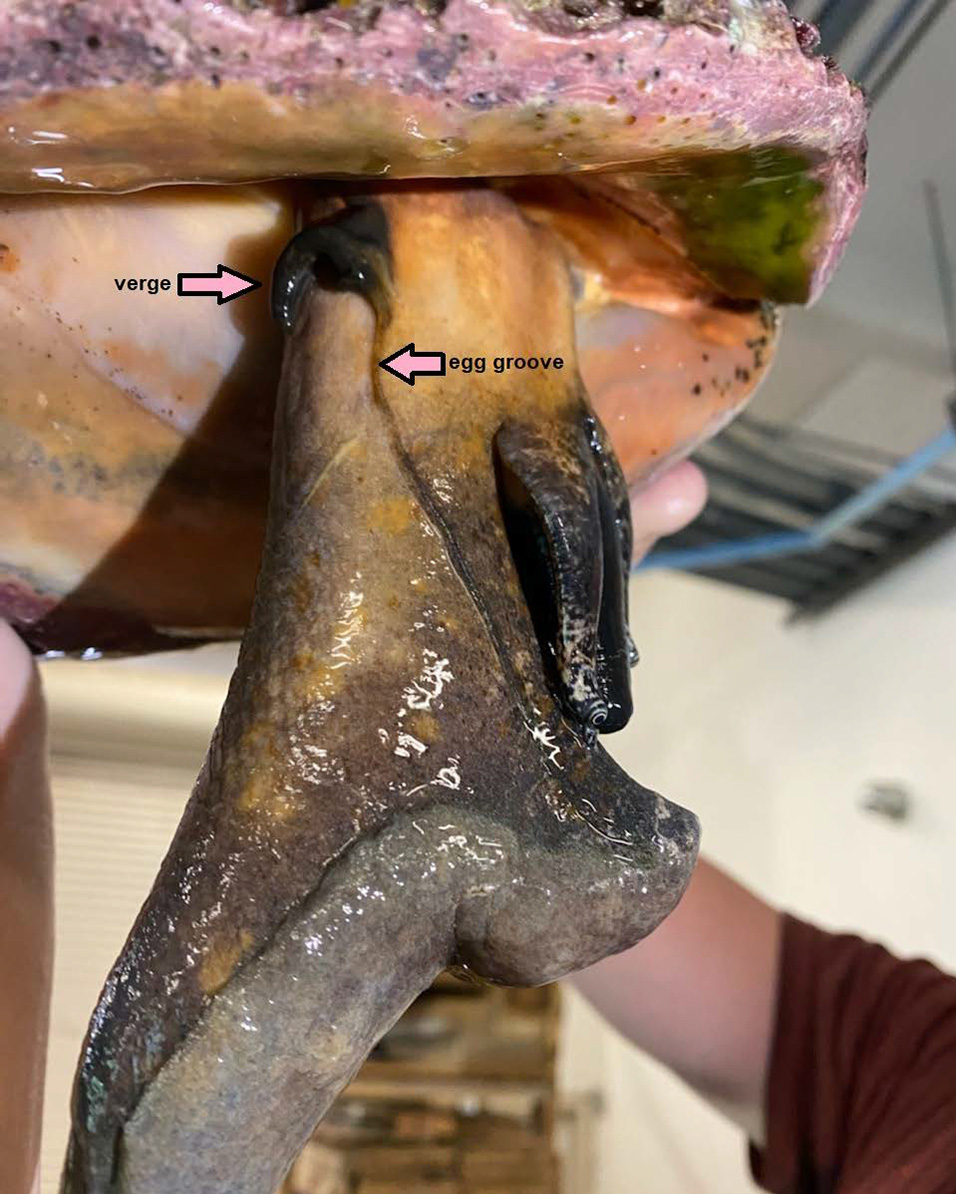
This female specimen of the queen conch, Aliger gigas, shows signs of imposex: it has developed a male sexual organ (verge) due to previous exposure to organotin compounds.

Imposex is a disorder observed in certain marine and freshwater gastropod mollusks, where female individuals develop male sexual characteristics, such as a penis and vas deferens, due to exposure to specific environmental pollutants. This condition is primarily induced by organotin compounds, notably tributyltin (TBT), which have been widely used in antifouling paints for ships to prevent biofouling. Unlike intersex conditions that involve gonadal ambiguity, imposex results in the superimposition of male genitalia onto otherwise functional female reproductive anatomy, often leading to sterility and population declines in affected species.

The phenomenon was first documented in the 1960s and has since been identified in over 260 gastropod species worldwide. Imposex serves as a sensitive bioindicator for monitoring organotin pollution in marine environments. The severity of imposex is often quantified using the Vas Deferens Sequence Index (VDSI), which assesses the progression of male organ development in females.

In response to the ecological risks posed by TBT, international regulations have been implemented to restrict its use. The International Maritime Organization (IMO) adopted a global ban on TBT-based antifouling paints, which came into effect in 2008. Subsequent studies have shown a decline in imposex prevalence in some regions, indicating partial recovery of affected gastropod populations. However, the persistence of TBT in marine sediments continues to pose challenges for the complete eradication of imposex effects.

== History ==
In the 1950s, organotin compounds were discovered to be highly effective in preventing the buildup of marine organisms on ship hulls, leading to their widespread use in antifouling paints by the 1960s. The use of these paints expanded rapidly during that decade. Around the late 1960s, researchers first observed imposex in the common dogwhelk, Nucella lapillus. It was also observed 10 years later in another species, Ilyanassa obsoleta, but it wasn't until 1981 that this phenomenon was directly linked to organotin exposure. Once the connection was made, pressure mounted to eliminate tributyltin (TBT) and related organotins from marine antifouling products due to their harmful environmental effects.

Although the majority of research on imposex has historically focused on marine species, organotin pollution and imposex are not restricted to exclusively marine habitats. The condition is known to affect estuarine species such as Heleobia australis, and also freshwater species such as apple snails (Pomacea spp.), and the ramshorn apple snail (Marisa cornuarietis).

== Biological effects ==
Imposex in marine gastropods is triggered by organotin compounds interfering with the hormonal regulation of sexual development. Although this link is well established, scientists have yet to agree on the precise biological mechanisms involved. Several competing theories propose that organotins disrupt different hormonal signaling pathways, including neuroendocrine, steroid-like, or retinoid (vitamin A-related) systems. It is also possible that multiple pathways contribute to the condition, though this has not been definitively confirmed.

In species such as the dog whelk, the growth of a penis in imposex females gradually blocks the oviduct, although ovule production continues. An imposex female dog whelk passes through several stages of penis growth before it becomes unable to maintain a constant production of ovules. Later stages of imposex lead to sterility and the premature death of the females of reproductive age, which can adversely affect the entire population.

Despite uncertainties surrounding the exact mechanisms, a 2006 study identified imposex as one of the few reliable biomarkers for assessing ecological risk and monitoring environmental health. This is due to its high sensitivity, its specificity to organotin exposure, and the relatively well-understood nature of its biological effects. Additionally, imposex is not easily influenced by confounding environmental variables, and the condition in individual snails can be directly linked to broader impacts on population and community dynamics.

=== Inducing substances ===
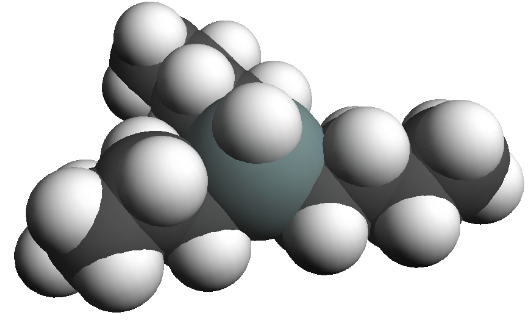
Tributyltin (TBT) hydride model

Initially, tributyltin (TBT), which can be active in extremely low concentrations, was believed to be the only inducer of imposex, but recent studies reported other substances as inducers, such as triphenyltin (TPT) and ethanol. Tributyltin (TBT) is thought to induce imposex primarily through inappropriate activation of the retinoid X receptor (RXR) pathway. RXR normally plays a role in reproductive development and endocrine signaling in gastropods. TBT acts as a high-affinity ligand for RXR, mimicking endogenous ligands such as 9-cis-retinoic acid, thereby triggering masculinization of female snails.

Aside from its use in antifouling paints, TBT is widely employed in products such as fungicides, wood preservatives, PVC stabilisers, and catalysts, creating additional sources of pollution. TBT and its main breakdown products, dibutyltin and monobutyltin, are commonly found in marine waters and sediments worldwide, but also appear in the surface waters and sediments of rivers and lakes, especially near areas with heavy boat traffic. In water, TBT can break down through chemical processes and sunlight, with a half-life ranging from 6 to 126 days. Its biological breakdown in freshwater and seawater usually takes between 6 days and several weeks. In sediments, especially those without oxygen, it degrades much more slowly, sometimes taking months or even up to 20 years. While the harmful effects of TBT on marine ecosystems are well known, much less research has focused on its impacts in freshwater systems.

== Affected regions and species ==
In the late 1970's, imposex had been recognized in at least 34 gastropod species. This number had increased to at least 100 species a decade later, and by 1994, it had been verified in females of at least 195 species worldwide. The records continued to increase to a total of 260 species from marine and freshwater environments in the following 15 years.

Countries in which imposex has been documented in gastropods include:

Africa

- South Africa

Asia

- Indonesia
- Japan
- Singapore
- Thailand

Europe

- England
- Greenland
- Iceland
- Italy
- Portugal
- Scotland
- United Kingdom
- The Netherlands

North America

- Canada
- Mexico
- Panama
- United States

Oceania

- Australia
- New Zealand

South America

- Argentina
- Brazil
- Chile
- Ecuador
- Peru
- Venezuela

== Case studies ==
Long-term monitoring studies have demonstrated that the prevalence of imposex in marine gastropods is directly correlated with TBT concentrations in the environment. A comprehensive study conducted along the Norwegian coastline from 1991 to 2017 evaluated the levels of TBT and imposex in populations of the dogwhelk (Nucella lapillus). The study documented a significant decline in both TBT concentrations and imposex incidence following the implementation of national and international bans on TBT-based antifouling paints. However, the rate of recovery varied among different localities. This variation was attributed to factors such as sediment characteristics, historical pollution levels, and hydrodynamic conditions, which influence the persistence of TBT in the environment.

In 1993, Scientists from the Plymouth Marine Laboratory found a thriving dog-whelk population in the Dumpton Gap, near Ramsgate in the UK despite high levels of TBT in the water. In the Dumpton Gap population, only 25% of females showed any significant signs of imposex, while 10% of males were characterized by the absence of a penis or an undersized penis, with incomplete development of the vas deferens and prostate. After further experiments, scientists concluded that "Dumpton Syndrome" was a genetic selection caused by high TBT levels. TBT-resistance was improved at the cost of lower reproductive fitness.

In 2024, the first recorded case of imposex in Triplofusus giganteus (the largest marine gastropod in the Atlantic) was reported in Florida. Three out of four wild-collected females exhibited pseudopenis structures, histologically confirmed to contain vas deferens tissue. This discovery was significant given the species' limited reproductive capacity and ecological importance as a top predator.

== Biomonitoring ==
Several marine gastropods serve as sensitive bioindicators for assessing TBT pollution through the measurement of imposex levels. The Vas Deferens Sequence Index (VDSI) is a standardized metric employed to quantify the severity of imposex in affected populations. OSPAR utilizes this index to evaluate ecological quality and the success of pollution mitigation strategies. Due to their high sensitivity to TBT and other organotin compounds, several gastropod species, such as Nucella lapillus in Europe and Lepsiella scobina in New Zealand, have become established bioindicators for organotin contamination. In the case of L. scobina, the intensity of imposex correlates with environmental TBT levels and has been used to map contamination in coastal waters.

A study published in 2011 reported that imposex levels are elevated in dog conch (Laevistrombus canarium) populations located near Malaysian ports. However, the researchers found no evidence of sterility among affected females. Their findings suggest that females of L. canarium commonly develop a penis when exposed to organotin compounds in seawater, but this condition does not result in sterility for this species. The dog conch's ability to tolerate imposex without reproductive failure makes it a reliable local bioindicator for organotin contamination.

== Environmental regulations ==
Major international organizations, including the Oslo-Paris Commission, the European Commission, and the International Maritime Organization (IMO), played crucial roles in driving the global effort to restrict the use of TBT. The first national bans on TBT-based paints for recreational boats and vessels under 25 meters in length were introduced in the late 1980s and early 1990s. Norway implemented this restriction in 1990 and extended it to larger vessels over 25 meters in 2003. A worldwide ban on TBT in all antifouling paints officially came into effect in January 2008. TBT-based compounds were included in the Rotterdam Convention and have been banned by the International Convention on the Control of Harmful Anti-fouling Systems on Ships. Today, TBT is classified as a priority hazardous substance under both the Water Framework Directive and the Marine Strategy Framework Directive within the European Union.

In the early 1990s, several coastal nations, including Norway, began monitoring TBT levels and the occurrence of imposex in their coastal waters. Not long after the initial bans on TBT-based paints were implemented, snail populations in some of the most heavily impacted areas began to show signs of recovery. Nevertheless, while there have been partial recoveries of gastropod populations and a decline in imposex prevalence, several reports have documented persistent imposex cases. A ban on tributyltin was implemented in Canada in 2003, however, in 2006, dog whelks with imposex could still be found on the shores of Halifax Harbour in Nova Scotia. Similar situations have emerged involving other species such as Triplofusus giganteus, Strombus pugilis, and Melongena melongena, which indicates that TBT may still linger in sediments or continue to impact large-bodied, long-lived species or rather may still be widely used clandestinely.

== See also ==
- Environmental issues with paint
- Organotin chemistry
