= Fusistrombus =

Scientific classification
- Kingdom: Animalia
- Phylum: Mollusca
- Class: Gastropoda
- Subclass: Caenogastropoda
- Order: Littorinimorpha
- Family: Strombidae
- Genus: Fusistrombus; Bandel, 2007

Type species
- Strombus fusiformis G. B. Sowerby II, 1842

Synonyms
- Neostrombus Liverani, Dekkers & S. J. Maxwell, 2021 junior objective synonym; Strombus (Fusistrombus) Bandel, 2007 superseded rank

Genus of gastropods

Fusistrombus is a genus of sea snails, marine gastropod mollusks in the family Strombidae, the true conchs.

== Nomenclature ==
Some authors have argued that the name Fusistrombus is not available from Bandel (2007) who, admittedly, did not explicitly diagnose the new subgenus, but he included in it only the type species, which he diagnosed, and we take the view that this confered availability to the name Fusistrombus

== Species ==
- Fusistrombus fusiformis (G. B. Sowerby II, 1842)
