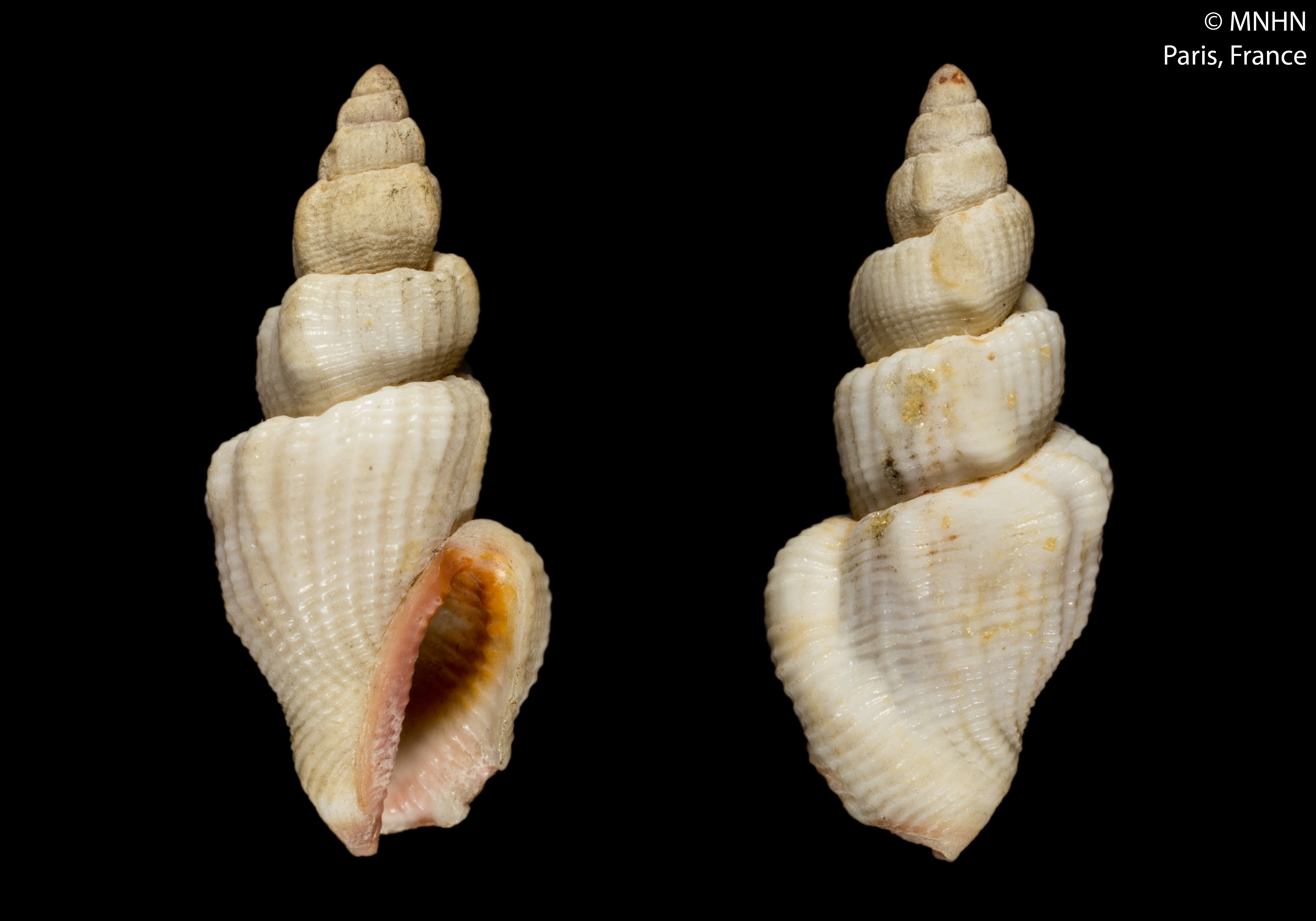
- Shell of Hawaiistrombus scalariformis (syntype at MNHN, Paris)

Scientific classification
- Kingdom: Animalia
- Phylum: Mollusca
- Class: Gastropoda
- Subclass: Caenogastropoda
- Order: Littorinimorpha
- Superfamily: Stromboidea
- Family: Strombidae
- Genus: Hawaiistrombus; Bandel, 2007

Synonyms
- Strombus (Hawaiistrombus) Bandel, 2007 superseded rank

= Hawaiistrombus =

Genus of gastropods

Hawaiistrombus is a genus of sea snails, marine gastropod mollusks in the family Strombidae, the true conchs.

== Species ==
- Hawaiistrombus hellii (Kiener, 1843)
- Hawaiistrombus scalariformis (Duclos, 1833)
