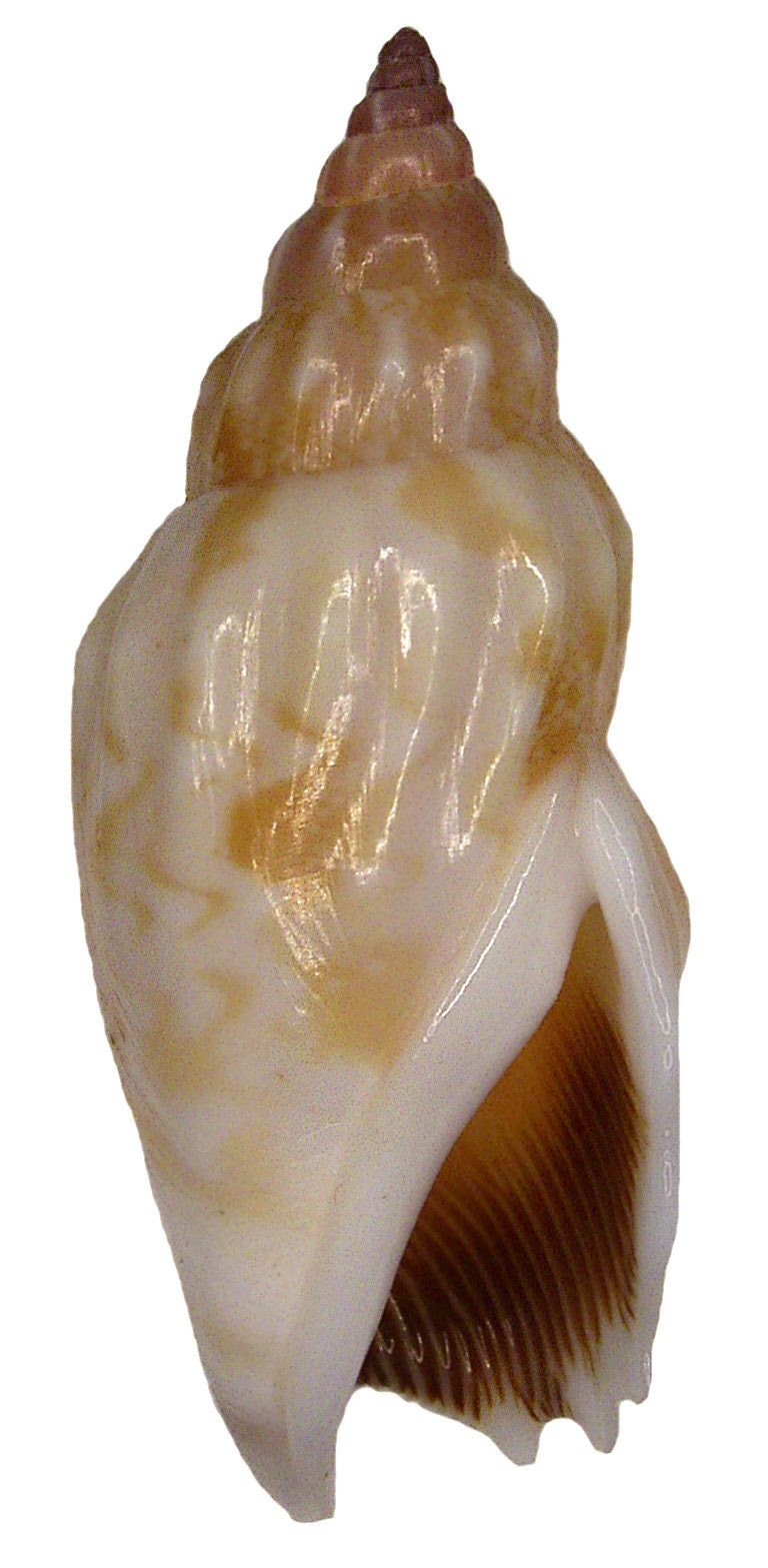
- Tridentarius dentatus shell

Scientific classification
- Kingdom: Animalia
- Phylum: Mollusca
- Class: Gastropoda
- Subclass: Caenogastropoda
- Order: Littorinimorpha
- Superfamily: Stromboidea
- Family: Strombidae
- Genus: Tridentarius; Kronenberg & Vermeij, 2002

Type species
- Strombus dentatus Linnaeus, 1758

= Tridentarius =

Genus of gastropods

Tridentarius is a monospecific genus of sea snails, marine gastropod mollusks in the family Strombidae, the true conchs.

== Species ==
Species within the genus Tridentarius include:

- Tridentarius dentatus (Linnaeus, 1758)
