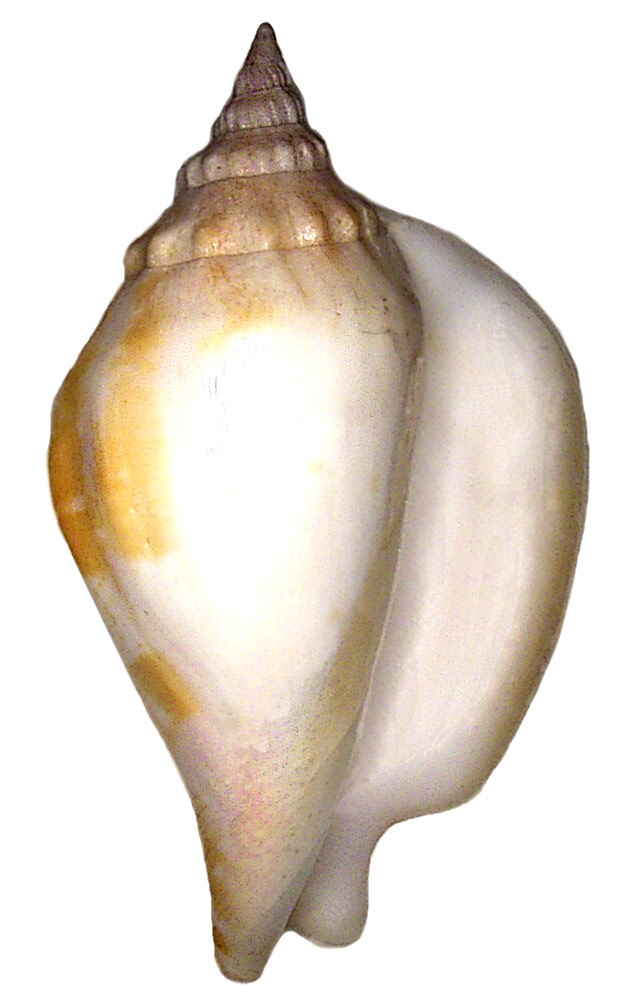
- Labiostrombus epidromis

Scientific classification
- Kingdom: Animalia
- Phylum: Mollusca
- Class: Gastropoda
- Subclass: Caenogastropoda
- Order: Littorinimorpha
- Family: Strombidae
- Genus: Labiostrombus; Oostingh, 1925

Type species
- Labiostrombus epidromis Linnaeus, 1758

Synonyms
- Gallinula Mörch, 1852 (Invalid: junior homonym of Gallinula Brisson, 1760 [Aves]; Labiostrombus is a replacement name); Strombus (Labiostrombus)

= Labiostrombus =

Genus of gastropods

Labiostrombus is a monospecific genus of sea snails, marine gastropod mollusks in the family Strombidae, the true conchs.

== Species ==
Species within the genus Labiostrombus include:

- Labiostrombus epidromis (Linnaeus, 1758) : common name : the Swan Conch; this species occurs in the Pacific Ocean along the Ryukyus (Japan), New Caledonia and Queensland, Australia. The shell size varies between 50 mm and 95 mm.
