= Maculastrombus =

- Shell of Maculastrombus rapanuensis (specimen at the Natural History Museum, Rotterdam)

Scientific classification
- Kingdom: Animalia
- Phylum: Mollusca
- Class: Gastropoda
- Subclass: Caenogastropoda
- Order: Littorinimorpha
- Family: Strombidae
- Genus: Maculastrombus; Liverani, Dekkers & S. J. Maxwell, 2021

Type species
- Strombus maculatus G. B. Sowerby II, 1842

Synonyms
- Canarium (Conundrum) Liverani, Dekkers & S. J. Maxwell, 2021 junior subjective synonym

Genus of gastropods

Maculastrombus is a genus of sea snails, marine gastropod mollusks in the family Strombidae, the true conchs.

== Species ==
- Maculastrombus betuleti (Kronenberg, 1991)
- Maculastrombus depauperatus (Dautzenberg & Bouge, 1933)
- Maculastrombus klineorum (Abbott, 1960)
- Maculastrombus maculatus (G. B. Sowerby II, 1842)
- Maculastrombus microurceus (Kira, 1959)
- Maculastrombus mutabilis (Swainson, 1821)
- Maculastrombus ochroglottis (Abbott, 1960)
- Maculastrombus ostergaardi (Pilsbry, 1921)
- Maculastrombus rapanuensis (Liverani, Wieneke & Kronenberg, 2021)
