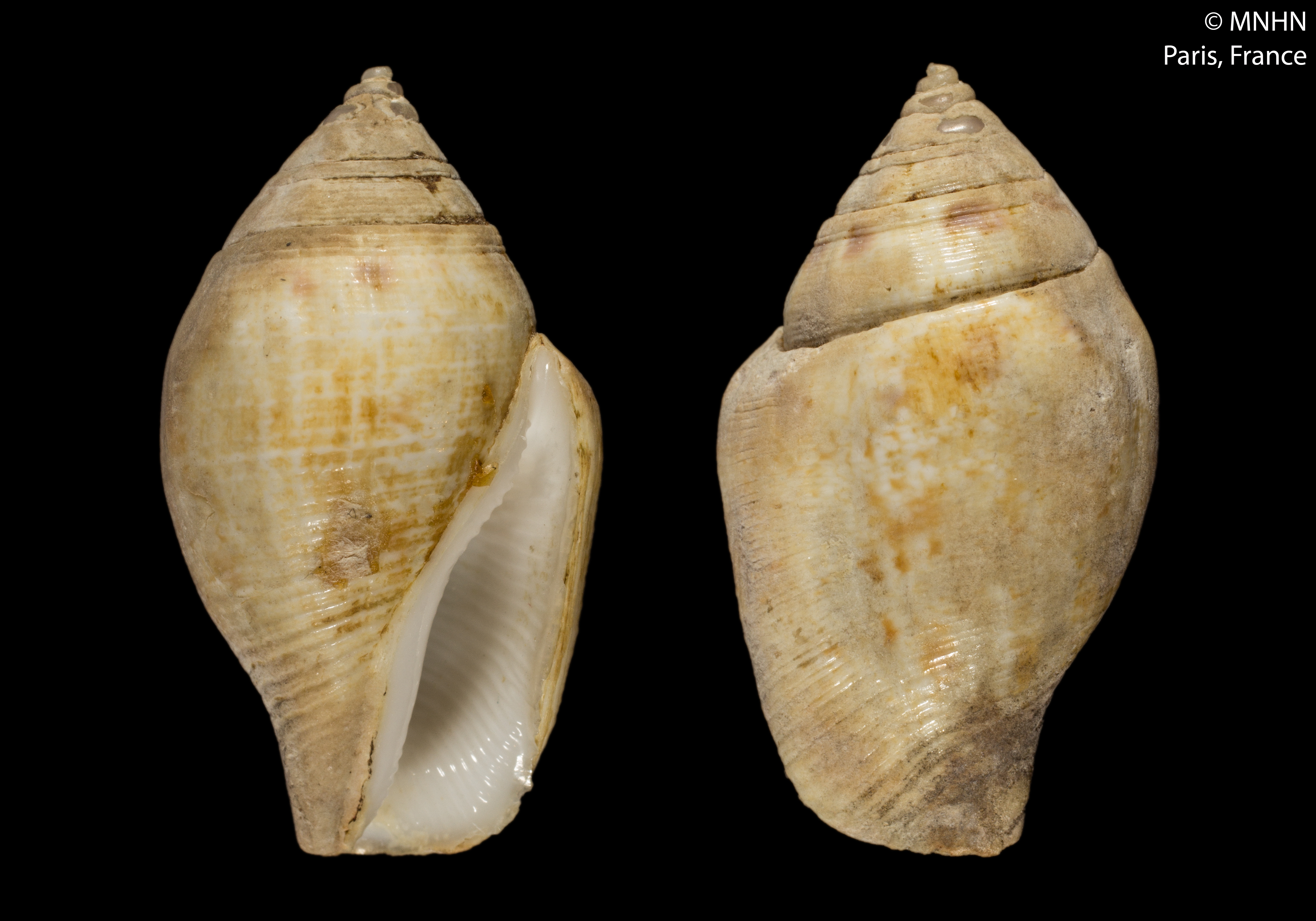
- Shell of Maculastrombus maculatus (syntype at MNHN?, Paris)

Scientific classification
- Kingdom: Animalia
- Phylum: Mollusca
- Class: Gastropoda
- Subclass: Caenogastropoda
- Order: Littorinimorpha
- Family: Strombidae
- Genus: Maculastrombus
- Species: M. maculatus

Binomial name
- Maculastrombus maculatus (G.B. Sowerby II, 1842)

Synonyms
- Canarium maculatum (G. B. Sowerby II, 1842); Strombus maculatus G.B. Sowerby II, 1842 (original combination)

= Maculastrombus maculatus =

Species of gastropod

Maculastrombus maculatus is a marine species of snail, a gastropod mollusk in the family Strombidae, known as the true conchs.

C. maculatum is commonly referred to as the spotted conch. This species was introduced to the marine aquarium hobby where it is quite popular due to its small size and its willingness to reproduce in captivity.

== Description ==
Canarium maculatum is a small snail, growing to sizes of less than one inch in length. The shell is a creamy off-white color with varying streaks and spots of orange, yellow, and brown.

(Original description in Latin as Canarium maculatum) The shell is oval and smooth, with its anterior end truncated. It has a short spire with rounded, nodulose whorls, and a narrow, smooth aperture.

== Distribution ==
This species is common in intertidal zones throughout the Indo-Pacific. M. maculatus is most common near atolls, coral islands, and barrier reefs. The first described specimen was collected near the Sandwich Islands.
