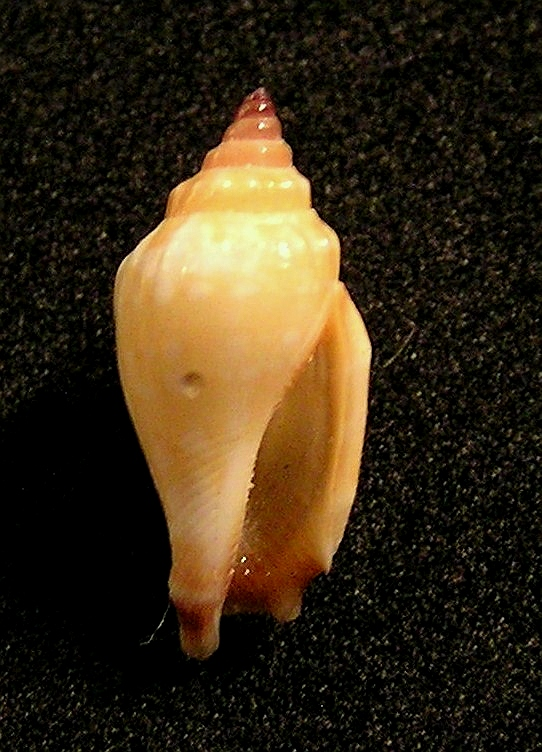
- Apertural view of Canarium wilsonorum

Scientific classification
- Kingdom: Animalia
- Phylum: Mollusca
- Class: Gastropoda
- Subclass: Caenogastropoda
- Order: Littorinimorpha
- Family: Strombidae
- Genus: Canarium
- Species: C. wilsonorum

Binomial name
- Canarium wilsonorum (Abbott, 1967)

Synonyms
- Strombus (Canarium) wilsoni Abbott, 1967; Strombus wilsoni Abbott, 1967 (incorrectly formed specific epithet); Strombus wilsonorum Abbott, 1967

= Canarium wilsonorum =

Species of gastropod

Canarium wilsonorum is a species of sea snail, a marine gastropod mollusk in the family Strombidae, the true conchs.

== Distribution ==
This species occurs in the Indian Ocean off Mozambique, Tanzania and the Mascarene Basin.
