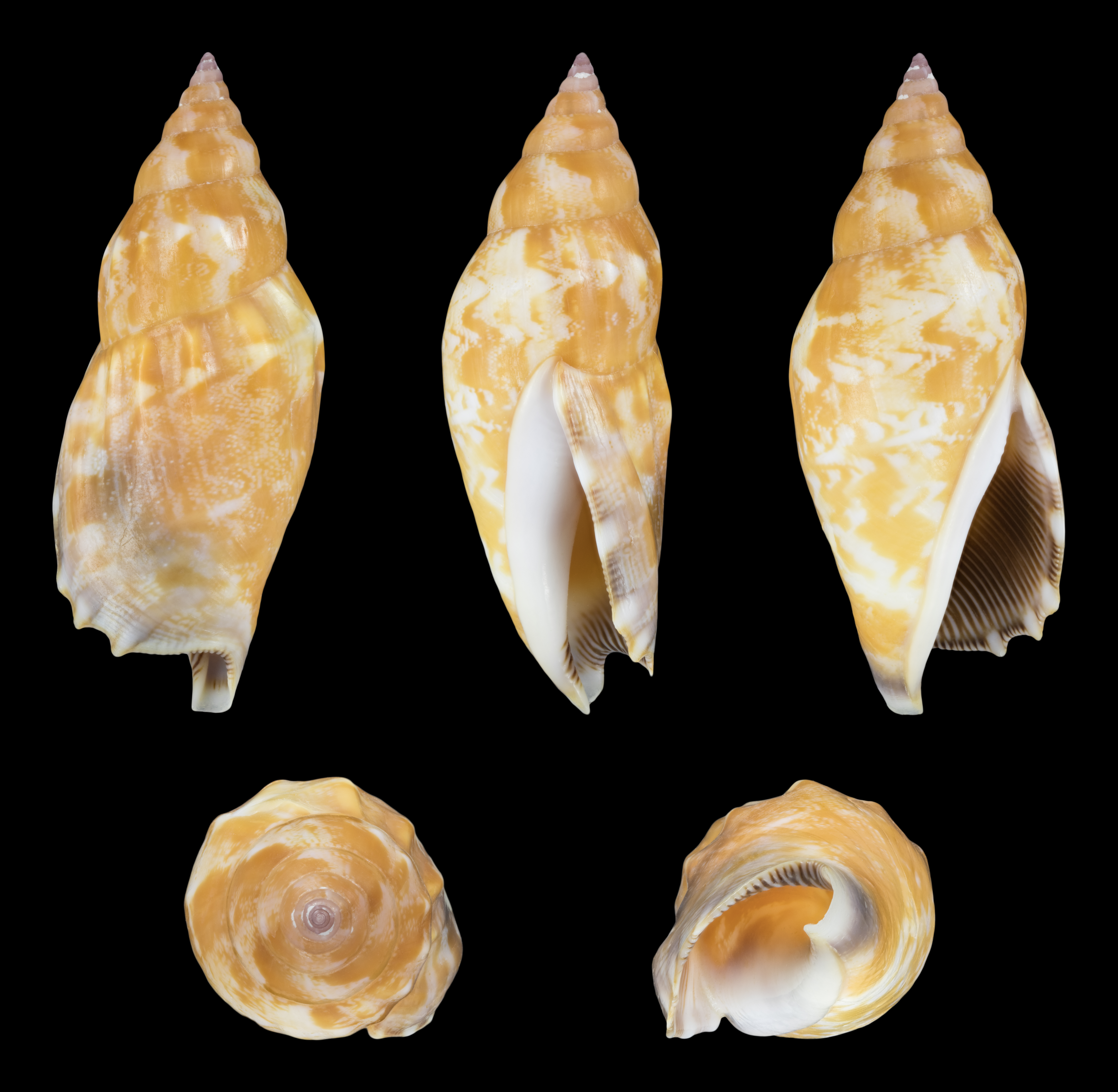
- Tridentarius dentatus shell

Scientific classification
- Kingdom: Animalia
- Phylum: Mollusca
- Class: Gastropoda
- Subclass: Caenogastropoda
- Order: Littorinimorpha
- Superfamily: Stromboidea
- Family: Strombidae
- Genus: Tridentarius
- Species: T. dentatus

Binomial name
- Tridentarius dentatus (Linnaeus, 1758)

Synonyms
- Strombus dentatus Linnaeus, 1758 (basionym); Strombus samar Dillwyn, 1817; Strombus samarensis Reeve, 1851; Strombus tridentatus Gmelin, 1791

= Tridentarius dentatus =

Species of gastropod

Tridentarius dentatus, commonly named the Toothed Conch, is a species of sea snail, a marine gastropod mollusk in the family Strombidae, the true conchs.

== Distribution ==
This species is distributed in the Red Sea, in the Indian Ocean along Aldabra, the Comores, Djibouti, Kenya, Madagascar, the Mascarene Basin, Mauritius, Mozambique, Réunion, the Seychelles, Somalia and Tanzania; in the Pacific Ocean in Polynesia and along Hawaii.

== Description ==
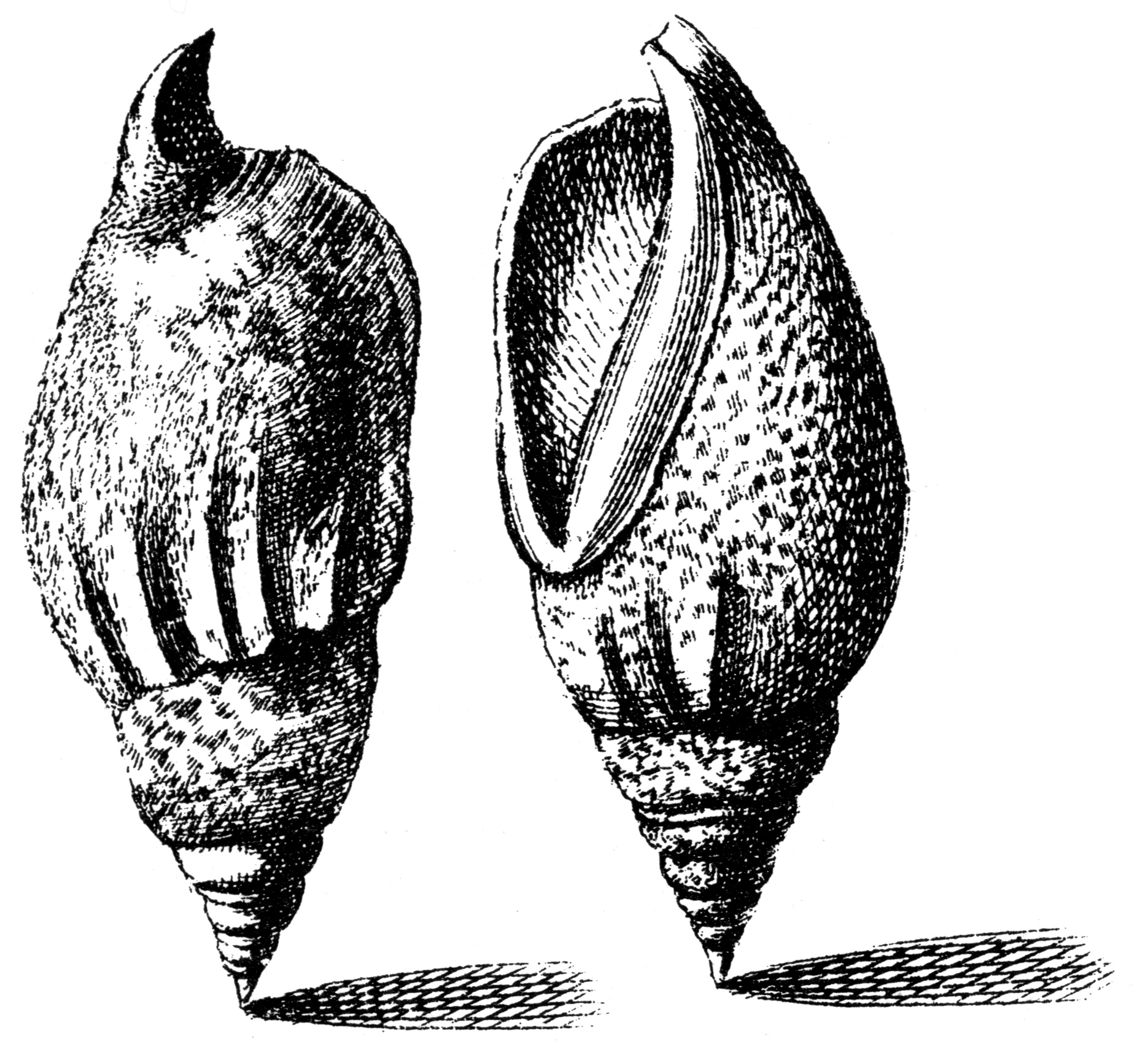
Tridentarius dentatus from Index Testarum Conchyliorum (1742) by Niccolò Gualtieri.

Length of the shell varies between 19 mm and 65 mm.
