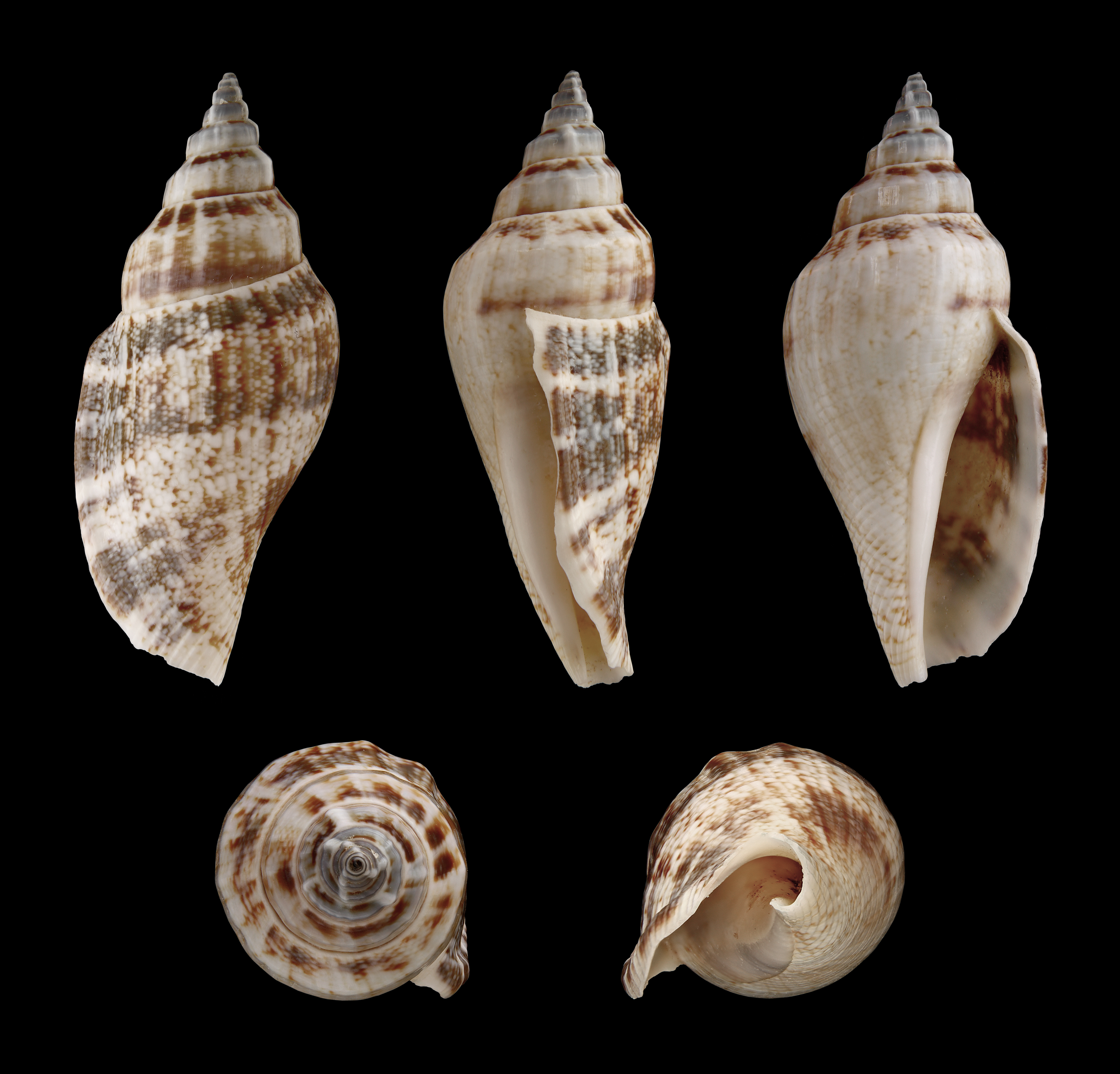
- Five views of a shell of Canarium urceus

Scientific classification
- Kingdom: Animalia
- Phylum: Mollusca
- Class: Gastropoda
- Subclass: Caenogastropoda
- Order: Littorinimorpha
- Superfamily: Stromboidea
- Family: Strombidae
- Genus: Canarium
- Species: C. urceus

Binomial name
- Canarium urceus (Linnaeus, 1758)

Synonyms
- Canarium urceus urceus (Linnaeus, 1758)· accepted, alternate representation; Canarium ustulatum Schumacher, 1817; Strombus (Canarium) urceus Linnaeus, 1758; Strombus muricatus Watson, 1885; Strombus reticulatus Link, 1807; Strombus urceus (Linnaeus, 1758) (basionym)

= Canarium urceus =

Species of gastropod

Canarium urceus is a species of sea snail, a marine gastropod mollusk in the family Strombidae, the true conchs.

== Sister taxa ==
Canarium incisum (Wood, 1828); Canarium anatellum (Duclos, 1844); Canarium esculentum (Maxwell, Rymer, Congdon, Dekkers, 2020); Canarium geelvinkbaaiensis Dekkers and Maxwell, 2020; Canarium manintveldi Dekkers and Maxwell, 2020; Canarium youngorum Dekkers and Maxwell, 2020; Canarium orrae (Abbott, 1960)

== Description ==
"The shell is elongated and fusiform and may appear biconic. The spire and bodywhorl have a distinctive rounded nodulated shoulder, that may become acute towards the anterior of the shell as the nodulation become finer, more acute and denser. The anterior canal is often well formed and acute in nature, being slightly reflected dorsally. The posterior of the bodywhorl is stained, and this staining continues to the dorsum, where it remains along the outer lip marginal fold and onto the dorsal whorl proper. The spire is always nodulated with the knobs varying from acute in some populations to more rounded and less pronounced in others. The aperture is margined in all cases with dark staining. The inner aperture with dark lirations over a rosy white base colour. The columella is midnight black, sometimes with some traces of deep plum that flush the posterior. The lirations of the columella while present, are in distinct" (Maxwell et al 2020).

(PDF) Canarium urceus (Linné, 1758) Studies Part 1: The Recircumscription of Strombus urceus Linné, 1758 (Neostromboidae: Strombidae). Available from: https://www.researchgate.net/publication/341590804_Canarium_urceus_Linne_1758_Studies_Part_1_The_Recircumscription_of_Strombus_urceus_Linne_1758_Neostromboidae_Strombidae [accessed Apr 22 2021].

== Distribution ==
This species is restricted to Singapore and The South China Sea (Maxwell 2020).
