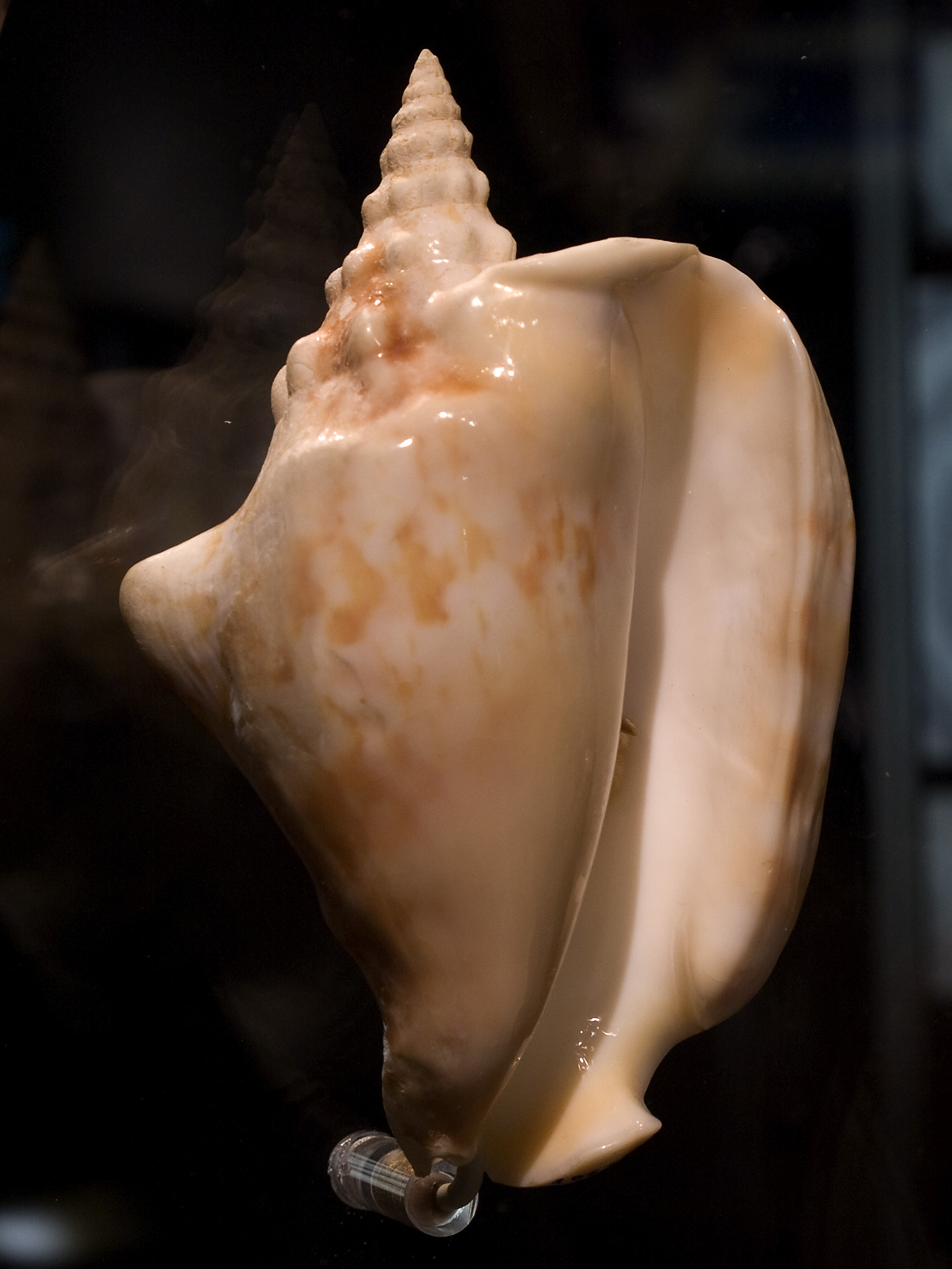
- Thersistrombus thersites shell

Scientific classification
- Kingdom: Animalia
- Phylum: Mollusca
- Class: Gastropoda
- Subclass: Caenogastropoda
- Order: Littorinimorpha
- Superfamily: Stromboidea
- Family: Strombidae
- Genus: Thersistrombus; Bandel, 2007

Type species
- Strombus thersites Swainson, 1823

= Thersistrombus =

Genus of gastropods

Thersistrombus is a genus of sea snails, marine gastropod mollusks in the family Strombidae, the true conchs.

== Species ==
Species within the genus Thersistrombus include:

- Thersistrombus thersites (Swainson, 1823)
