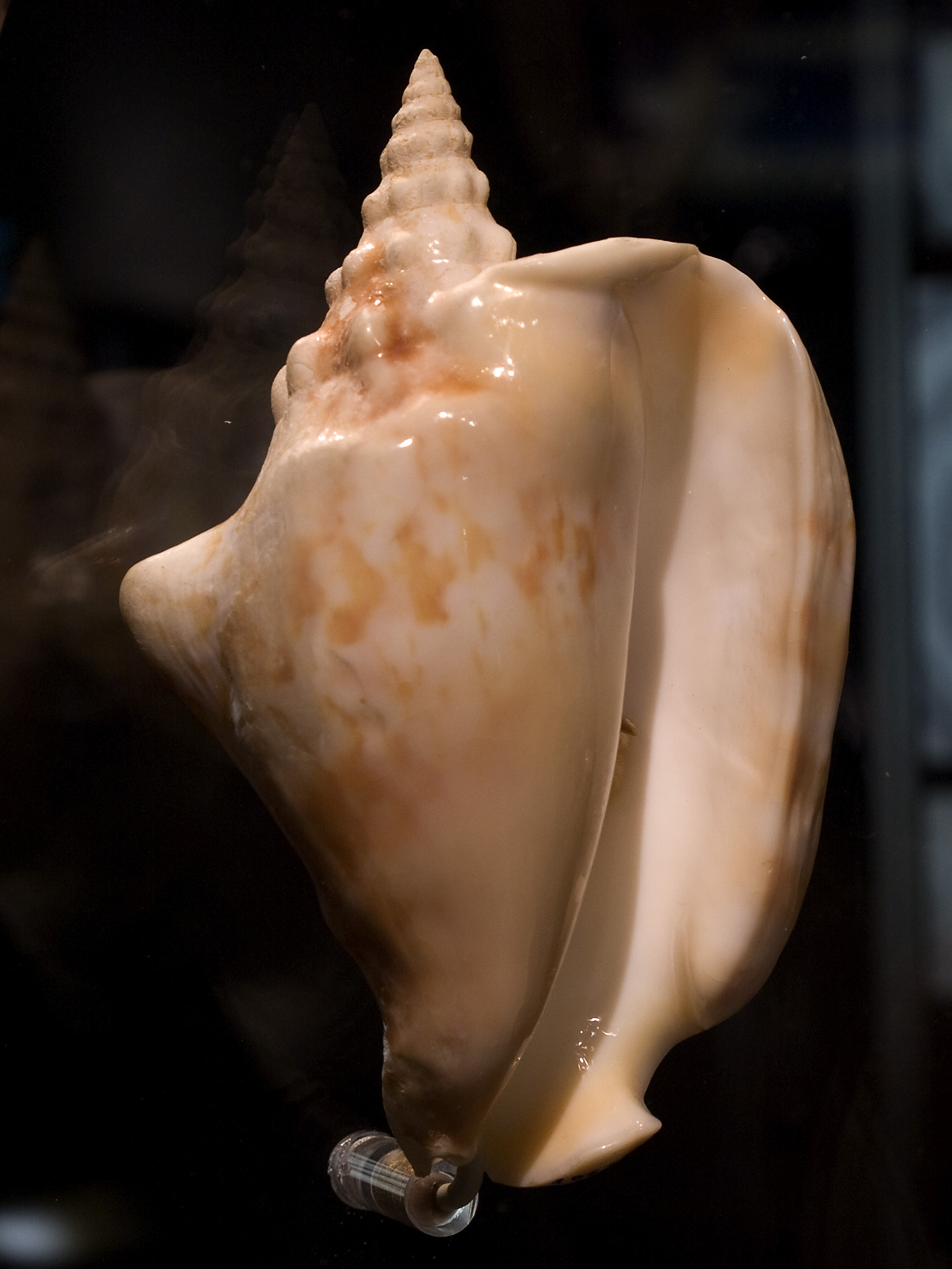
- Thersistrombus thersites

Scientific classification
- Kingdom: Animalia
- Phylum: Mollusca
- Class: Gastropoda
- Subclass: Caenogastropoda
- Order: Littorinimorpha
- Family: Strombidae
- Genus: Thersistrombus
- Species: T. thersites

Binomial name
- Thersistrombus thersites (Swainson, 1823)

Synonyms
- Strombus ponderosus Philippi, 1842; Strombus thersites Swainson, 1823; Tricornis thersites Swainson, 1823

= Thersistrombus thersites =

Species of gastropod

Thersistrombus thersites, common name : the thersite conch, is a species of sea snail, a marine gastropod mollusk in the family Strombidae, the true conchs.

== Description ==
The shell size varies between 100 mm and 170 mm. It is dextrally coiled and has lens eyes. It sexually reproduces, is a detritivore and moves by mucus mediated gliding.

== Distribution ==
This species is distributed in the Western Pacific Ocean and along the Philippines.
