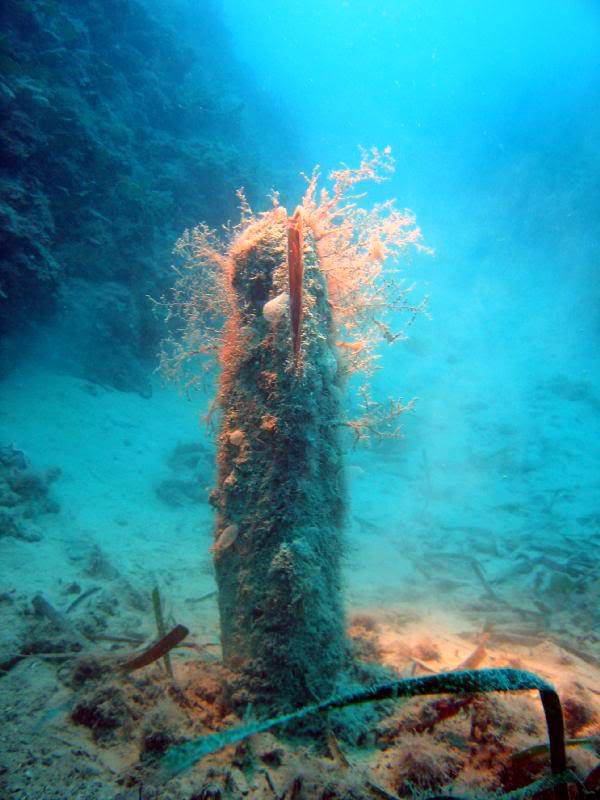
- Pinna nobilis

Scientific classification
- Kingdom: Animalia
- Phylum: Mollusca
- Class: Bivalvia
- Order: Pteriida
- Superfamily: Pinnoidea
- Family: Pinnidae
- Genus: Pinna; Linnaeus, 1758

Type species
- Pinna rudis Linnaeus, 1758

Synonyms
- Exitopinna Iredale, 1939; Pinna (Abyssopinna) P. W. Schultz & M. Huber, 2013· accepted, alternate representation; Pinna (Cyrtopinna) Mörch, 1853· accepted, alternate representation; Pinna (Exitopinna) Iredale, 1939· accepted, alternate representation; Pinna (Pinna) Linnaeus, 1758· accepted, alternate representation; Pinna (Quantulopinna) Iredale, 1939· accepted, alternate representation; Pinna (Subitopinna) Iredale, 1939· accepted, alternate representation; Pinnarius Duméril, 1805; Pinnula Rafinesque, 1815; Quantulopinna Iredale, 1939; Subitopinna Iredale, 1939

= Pinna (bivalve) =

Pinna Temporal range: Permian–Recent

Genus of bivalves

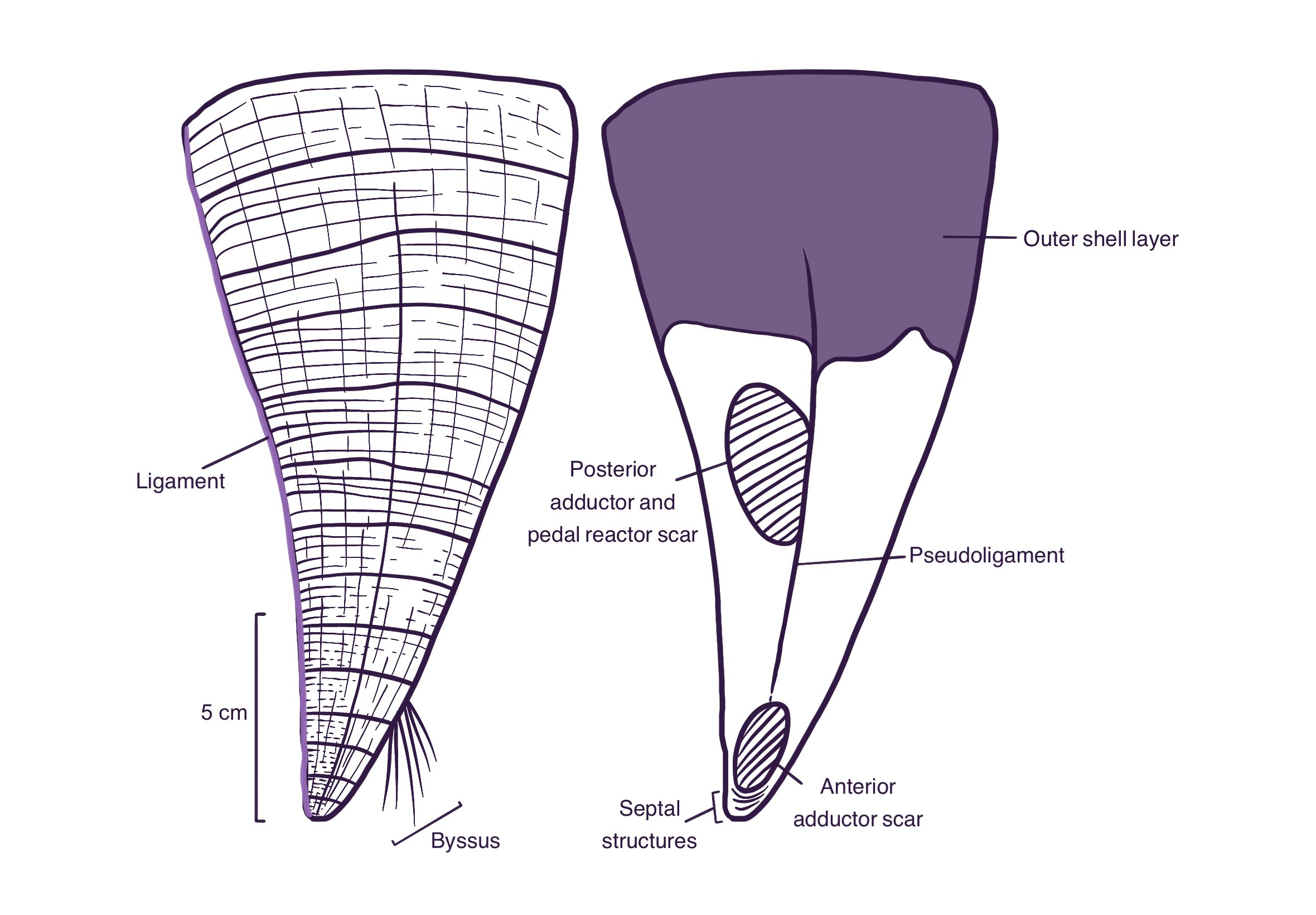
Pinna internal and external shell features

Pinna is a genus of bivalve molluscs belonging to the family Pinnidae. The type species of the genus is Pinna rudis.

These bivalves are sessile suspension feeders that live in shallow water, fixed to the substrate with a large, silky byssus. There are 32 different species in the genus Pinna, accounting for around 40% of the diversity in the family Pinnidae, and members of the genus are present almost globally. The most extensively studied species in the genus is the critically endangered P. nobilis, a Mediterranean pen shell which was historically important as the principal source of sea silk. Members of Pinna are also valued as sources of food, pearls and for the aesthetic value of their shells.

== Description ==
These pen shells can reach a length of about 80–90 cm (31–35 in). They are characterized by thin, elongated, wedge-shaped, and almost triangular shells with long, toothless edges. The surface of the shells shows radial ribs over their entire length.

Pinna is distinguished from its sibling genus Atrina by the presence of a sulcus dividing the nacreous region of the valves, and the positioning of the adductor scar on the dorsal side of shells. Pinna can also be distinguished from another of its relatives Streptopinna by being larger and having a more uniform shell shape.

The internal anatomy is consistent with that of a typical mussel, and includes adductor muscles, the mantle and gut, the foot, and the byssal glands.

Pinna musculature consists of an anterior and a posterior adductor muscle, which contract to close the shell, a posterior retractor muscle for moving the foot, and dorsal and ventral pallial retractor muscles, used to connect the mantle to the edge of the shell, and pull the mantle inside the shell when necessary. With the exception of the ventral pallial retractor muscle, everything else is located on the dorsal side of the animal. The anterior adductor muscle is very small, and it is located close to the anterior point, while the posterior adductor muscle is much larger, and is located about a third of the length along the shell, near the hinge plate. The latter is attached to the valve alongside the posterior pedal retractor muscle. The foot has two parts: a more slender anterior part that projects out and a posterior part that wraps around the byssus. The byssus is composed of fibrous, iridescent, brown threads and surrounds the pair of byssal glands. The mantle is mostly translucent, except near the posterior edge, where it is spotted.

== Distribution ==
Species in the genus Pinna are geographically widespread and is known to occur in tropical and subtropical seas around the world.

Pinna species are widespread in the Indo-Pacific, ranging as far south as South Africa and New Zealand and as far north as the Persian Gulf and Japan. On the west coast of North America, Pinna members are known from North Carolina to Argentina, and are abundant in the Caribbean and Gulf of Mexico. This genus is also historically very well known from the Mediterranean and Red Seas.

Fossil members of this genus have been found globally, dating back to the late Permian period and are especially well-represented and widespread in Jurassic and Cretaceous fossils.

== Ecology ==
=== Life habit ===
Pinna species live in coastal and marine waters, as well as in transitional inlets partially influenced by freshwater flow. Member of this genus are known to inhabit soft, muddy substrates, sandy seagrass meadows, coral reefs, and fields of coral rubble in relatively shallow water.

All members of the genus Pinna are sessile, and orient themselves vertically relative to the substrate with the thin, tapered end pointing downwards and the wide end open upwards. In muddy or soft, sandy conditions, Pinna will bury 50-95% of its body in substrate and will use tough byssal threads to keep them fixed in the soft substrate around them with the aperture elevated from, or flush with, the surface of the sediment. On more solid, rockier substrates, some Pinna can anchor themselves directly to hard substrates similarly to other common byssate molluscs.

Members of the genus Pinna often arrange themselve in clusters or loosely spaced colonies, and can provide an important hard substrate for boring and encrusting organisms in otherwise inhospitable sandy or muddy settings, and may promote ecological diversity in environments they inhabit. Pinna are often hosts of Pontonia shrimp and pea crabs, as well as of cardinalfish, amphipods, isopods and sea anemones, which can live inside of their mantle cavities.

=== Feeding ===
Members of the genus Pinna are generally filter feeders, however, some soft-bottom taxa, especially ones that are deeply buried in sediment, are likely deposit feeders. Pinna-genus bivalves consume a wide variety of prey, and includes zooplankton, phytoplankton, and organic detritus.

In Pinna nobilis, the size of the shell, and, as a result, the proportion of the shell that is above the surface of the substrate, are directly related with where nutrients were sourced. Larger P. nobilis showed a preference for prey higher in the water column, such as Calanoid copepods and diatoms, while smaller P. nobilis preferred more benthic prey, like Harpacticoid copepods and consumed a higher proportion of organic detritus, which is denser on the bottom.

=== Reproduction and development ===
Pinna bivalves are iteroparous broadcast spawners, and release male and female gametes into the water column separately to allow for external fertilization. Reproduction across the genus Pinna beyond this is diverse, some members of the genus, such as Pinna nobilis, P. rugosa, and P. bicolor have defined spawning periods, which generally occur during the summer, while others, like P. carnea that live in more tropical climates spawn year-round.

Fertilized gametes form trochophores, then veliger larvae, which are planktonic can drift for many days in the water column before settling onto substrate. The veliger of the genus Pinna are stubby, triangular in outline, transparent and already contains the heteromyarian, or anisomyarian musculature seen in adult Pinna, where one adductor muscle is much reduced in size compared to the other.

Upon reaching an appropriate substrate, the larva develops quickly, rapidly becoming sessile, and adult characteristics such as the ctenidium, mantle, and shell ornament take shape. Interestingly, all shell growth only occurs along the dorsal (pointed), ventral (wedge), and posterior margins, while no growth occurs anteriorly. The veliger shell quickly erodes, and is rarely preserved in adults.

== Human uses ==
=== Pearls ===
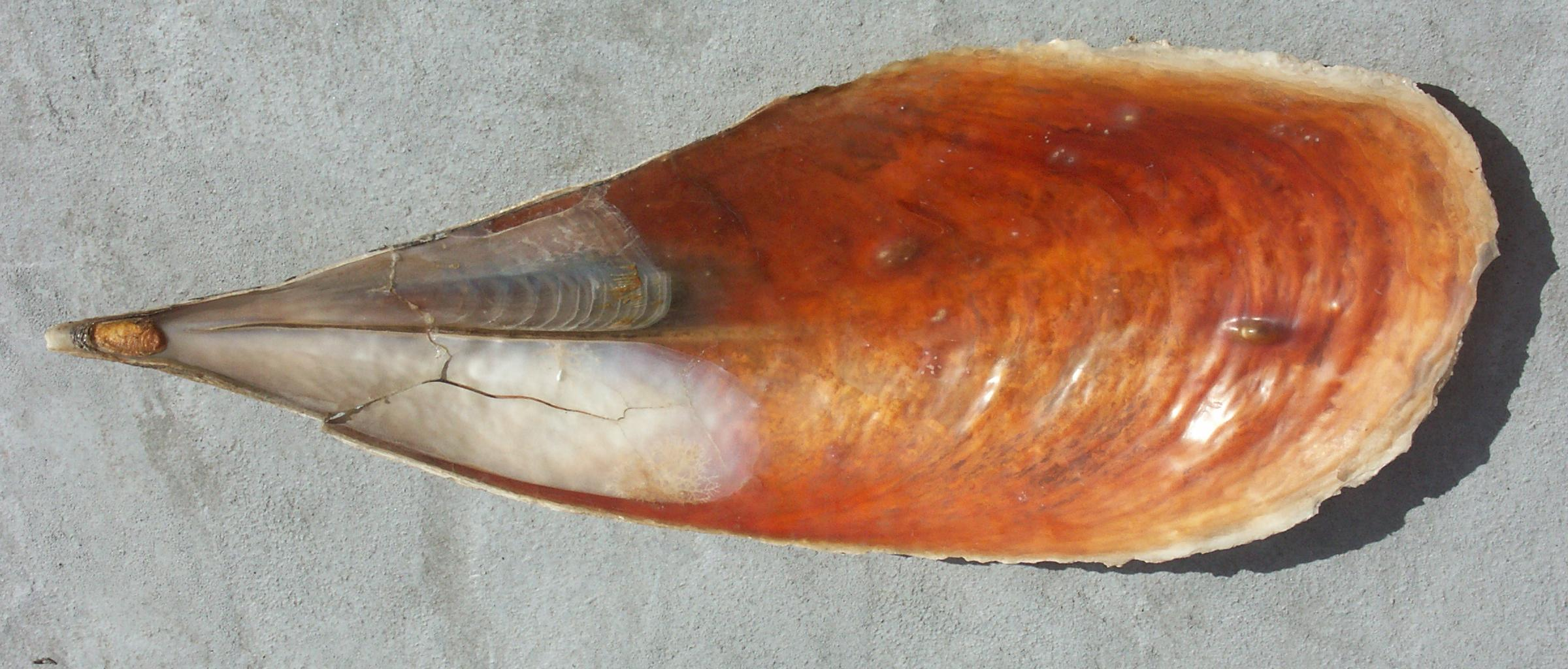
Pinna showing partial nacre covering with sulcus

Members of the genus Pinna are known to produce pearls. Due to the partial coverage of the insides of their shells with nacre, they are capable of producing both nacreous and non-nacreous pearls. Uniquely, members of Pinna appear to be unique in their capacity to produce gem-quality pearls that are made of calcite and contain carotenoids which can lead to colouration that ranges from off-white, to vivid orange, brown and black. Pinna pearls may also be elongate and teardrop-shaped, mirroring the shape of the host shell. The nacreous shell itself is also valuable as a collector's item.

=== Food ===
Members of the genus Pinna, as well as its sibling genus Atrina, are prized food sources around the Indo-pacific and Mediterranean. Members of the genus are both harvested in the wild and are cultured, within the genus Pinna, most aquaculture efforts are concentrated on Pinna rugosa in Mexico and Pinna nobilis, the noble pen shell, in the Mediterranean. Aquaculture from the harvesting and growing of spats has seen success in some members of Pinna, but is not performed commercially, and the majority of Pinna catch remains harvested wild. P. nobilis remains a delicacy in parts of the Mediterranean, and is still served in restaurants, despite its critically endangered status and the fact it is illegal to harvest.

== Conservation ==
=== Human efforts ===
As of 2019, Pinna nobilis is classified as a critically endangered species by the IUCN. Mass mortality events have caused nearly all Mediterranean populations to die out. Since then, conservation efforts such as transporting individuals to safer habitats, population monitoring, and captive breeding efforts have been made to preserve the species. In December 2022, the European Life Pinna Project set out to test their conservation protocols using the related Atrina genus as an experimental population because Atrina was not critically endangered or a protected species.

=== Parasites ===
Parasites such as the protozoan Haplosporidium pinnae, Myobacterium species and more, have been theorized as a potential cause of mortality for Pinna nobilis. In 2019, an event termed the "cold drop" resulted in high volumes of nutrients, sediments, and fresh water to flood Pinna habitats and allow the introduction of H. pinnae. The presence of parasites, along with mass mortality events, only contributed to the decline of P. nobilis populations following 2019.

== Species ==
According to the World Register of Marine Species, extant species in the genus Pinna are:

- Pinna angustana Lamarck, 1819
- Pinna atropurpurea G. B. Sowerby I, 1825
- Pinna attenuata Reeve, 1858
- Pinna bichi Thach, 2016
- Pinna bicolor Gmelin, 1791
- Pinna carnea Gmelin, 1791
- Pinna cellophana Matsukuma & Okutani, 1986
- Pinna deltodes Menke, 1843
- Pinna dolabrata Lamarck, 1819
- Pinna electrina Reeve, 1858
- Pinna epica Jousseaume, 1894
- Pinna evexa Callomon, 2023
- Pinna exquisita Dall, Bartsch & Rehder, 1938
- Pinna fimbriatula Reeve, 1859
- Pinna incurva Gmelin, 1791
- Pinna linguafelis (Habe, 1953)
- Pinna madida Reeve, 1858
- Pinna menkei Reeve, 1858
- Pinna muricata Linnaeus, 1758
- Pinna nembia Simone, 2024
- Pinna nobilis Linnaeus, 1758
- Pinna papyracea Gmelin, 1791
- Pinna pereria Simone, 2024
- Pinna rapanui Araya & Osorio, 2016
- Pinna rudis Linnaeus, 1758
- Pinna rugosa G. B. Sowerby I, 1835
- Pinna saccata Linnaeus, 1758
- Pinna sanguinolenta Reeve, 1858
- Pinna trigonalis Pease, 1861
- Pinna trigonium Dunker, 1852
- Pinna trindadis Simone, 2024
- Pinna wayae P. W. Schultz & M. Huber, 2013

The following species are only known from the fossil record:

- †Pinna anderssoni Wilckens, 1910
- †Pinna arcuata J. Sowerby, 1821
- †Pinna blanfordi O. Boettger, 1880
- †Pinna cretacea (Schlotheim, 1813)
- †Pinna dissimilicostata X.-M. Gan, 1978
- †Pinna distans F. W. Hutton, 1873
- †Pinna folium G. Young & Bird, 1822
- †Pinna fragilis Watelet, 1868
- †Pinna freneixae Zinsmeister & Macellari, 1988
- †Pinna huiyangensis R.-J. Zhang, 1977
- †Pinna karabiensis Yanin, 2021
- †Pinna kawhiana Marwick, 1953
- †Pinna keexwaanensis McRoberts, 2017
- †Pinna lanceolata J. Sowerby, 1821
- †Pinna margaritacea Lamarck, 1805
- †Pinna mitis J. Phillips, 1829
- †Pinna muikadanensis Nakazawa, 1961
- †Pinna nyainrongensis S.-X. Wen, 1979
- †Pinna octavia Marwick, 1953
- †Pinna pacata Shilekhin, Mazaev & Biakov, 2023
- †Pinna plicata F. W. Hutton, 1873
- †Pinna qinghaiensis Y.-J. Lu, 1986
- †Pinna rembangensis K. Martin, 1910
- †Pinna robinaldina A. d'Orbigny, 1844
- †Pinna sobrali Zinsmeister, 1984
- †Pinna socialis A. d'Orbigny, 1850
- †Pinna subcuneata Eichwald, 1865
- †Pinna suprajurensis A. d'Orbigny, 1850
- †Pinna torulosa Repin, 2001
- †Pinna vanhoepeni Rennie, 1930
- †Pinnacaris dentata Garassino & Teruzzi, 1993
- †Pinnatiporidium toomeyi (Dragastan) Dragastan & Schlagintweit, 2005
- †Pinnatoporella carinata (Etheridge, 1879)
- †Pinnatulites microrugosa Hessland, 1949
- †Pinnatulites tumida Hessland, 1949
- †Pinnatulites varia Sarv, 1959

== Nomen nudum ==
- Pinna inflata Röding, 1798
- Pinna lubrica Lightfoot, 1786
- Pinna nebulosa Lightfoot, 1786
- Pinna nigricans Lightfoot, 1786
- Pinna striata Röding, 1798
- Pinna tenera Lightfoot, 1786
- Pinna violacea Röding, 1798

== Nomen dubium ==
- Pinna atrata Clessin, 1891
- Pinna bullata Gmelin, 1791
- Pinna marginata Lamarck, 1819
- Pinna minax Hanley, 1858
- Pinna rollei Clessin, 1891
- Pinna rostellum Hanley, 1858
- Pinna rotundata Linnaeus, 1758
- Pinna sanguinea Gmelin, 1791
- Pinna virgata Menke, 1843

== Synonyms ==
- Pinna squamosissima Philippi, 1849: synonym of Atrina serrata (G. B. Sowerby I, 1825)
- Pinna strangei Reeve, 1858: synonym of Atrina strangei (Reeve, 1858)
- Pinna stutchburii Reeve, 1859: synonym of Pinna attenuata Reeve, 1858
- Pinna subviridis Reeve, 1858: synonym of Atrina seminuda (Lamarck, 1819)
- Pinna tasmanica Tenison-Woods, 1876: synonym of Atrina tasmanica (Tenison Woods, 1876)
- Pinna truncata Philippi, 1844: synonym of Atrina fragilis (Pennant, 1777)
- Pinna tuberculosa Sowerby I, 1835: synonym of Atrina tuberculosa (G. B. Sowerby I, 1835)
- Pinna varicosa Lamarck, 1819: synonym of Pinna carnea Gmelin, 1791
- Pinna vespertina Reeve, 1858: synonym of Pinna atropurpurea G. B. Sowerby I, 1825
- Pinna vexillum Born, 1778: synonym of Atrina vexillum (Born, 1778)
- Pinna vitrea Gmelin, 1791: synonym of Streptopinna saccata (Linnaeus, 1758)
- Pinna vulgaris Roissy, 1804: synonym of Pinna nobilis Linnaeus, 1758
- Pinna whitechurchi Turton, 1932: synonym of Atrina squamifera (G. B. Sowerby I, 1835)
- Pinna zebuensis Reeve, 1858: synonym of Pinna muricata Linnaeus, 1758
- Pinna zelandica Gray, 1835: synonym of Atrina zelandica (Gray, 1835)

== Gallery ==
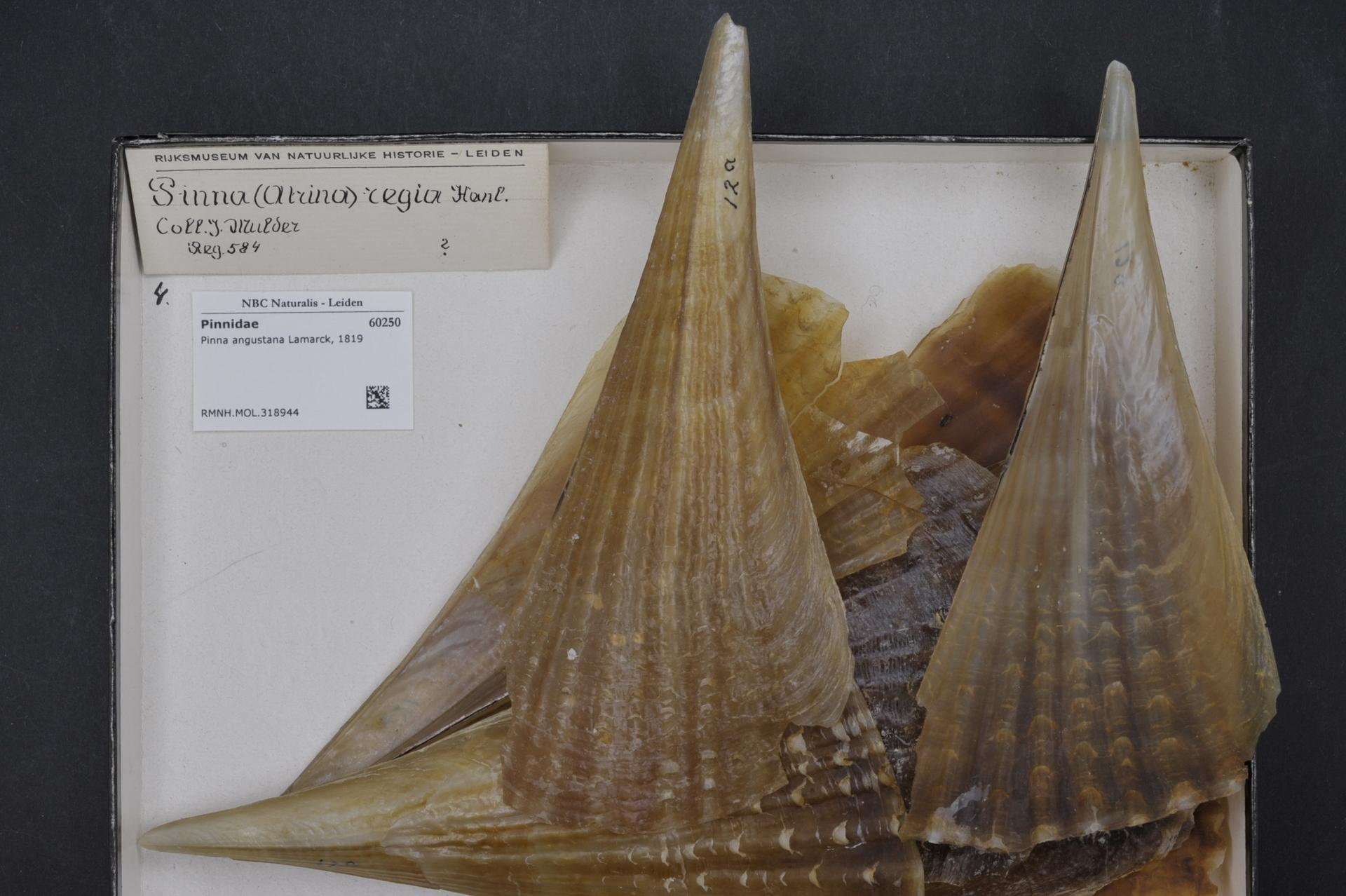
Pinna angustana

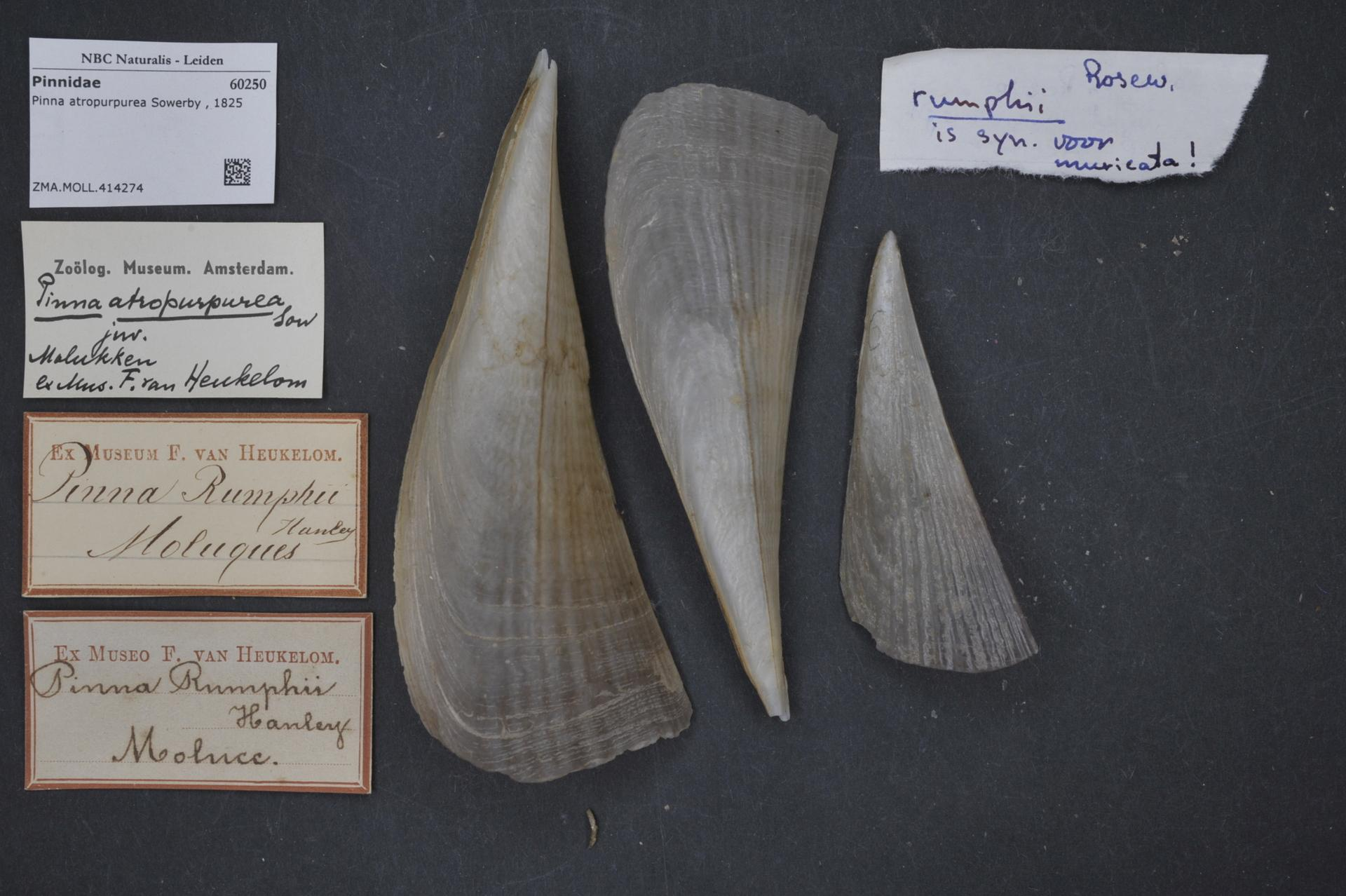
Pinna atropurpurea

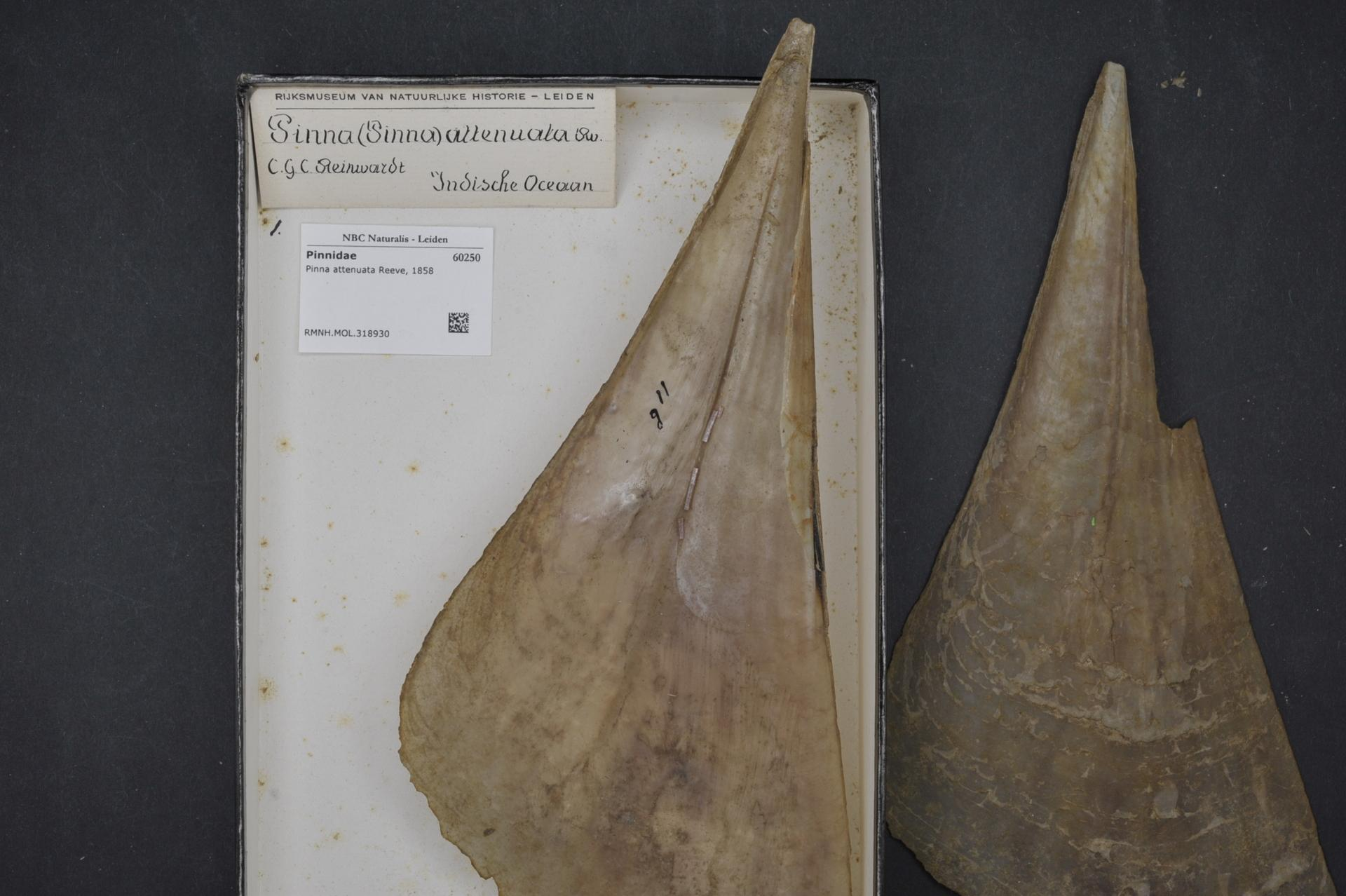
Pinna attenuata

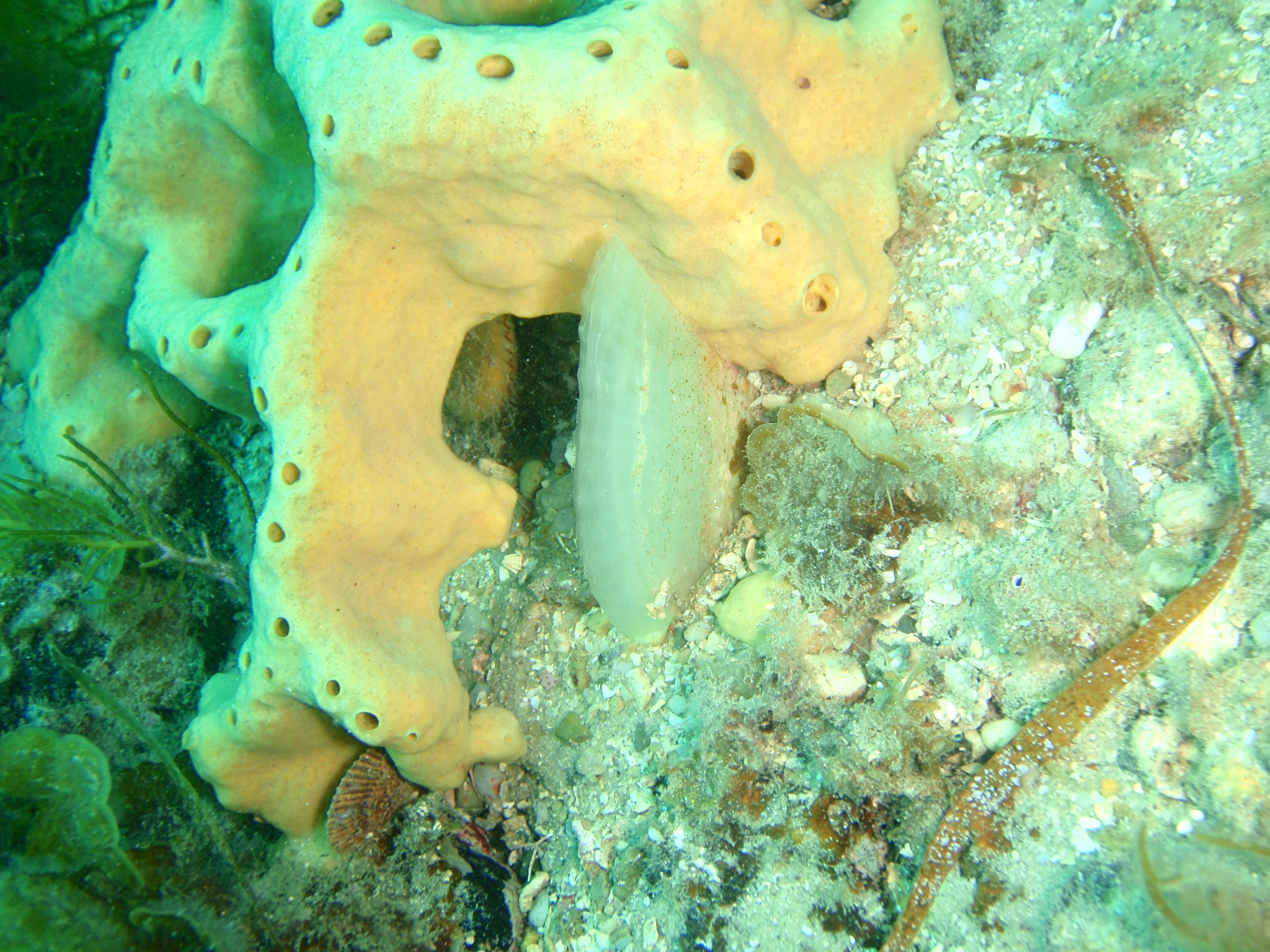
Pinna bicolor

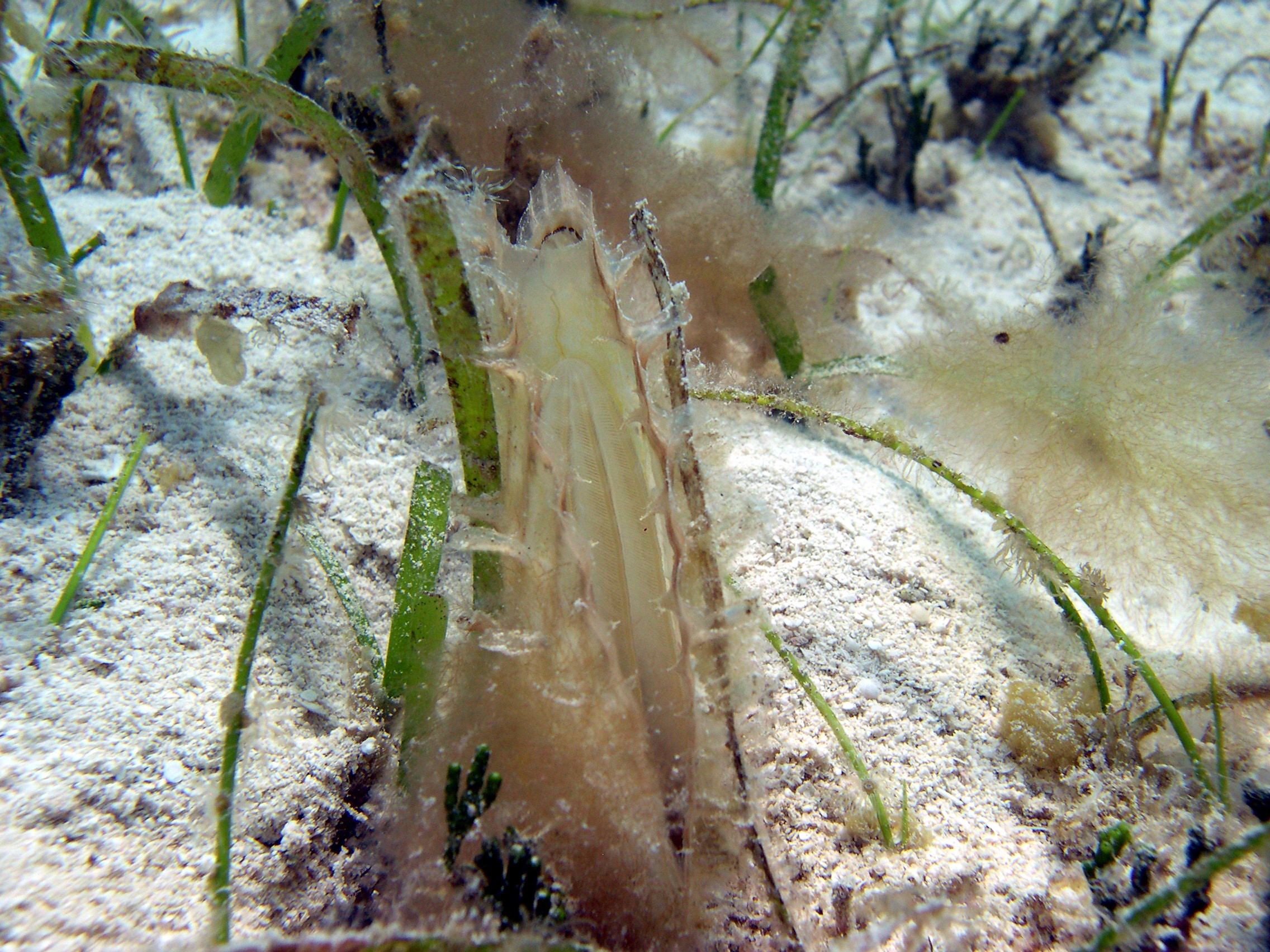
Pinna carnea

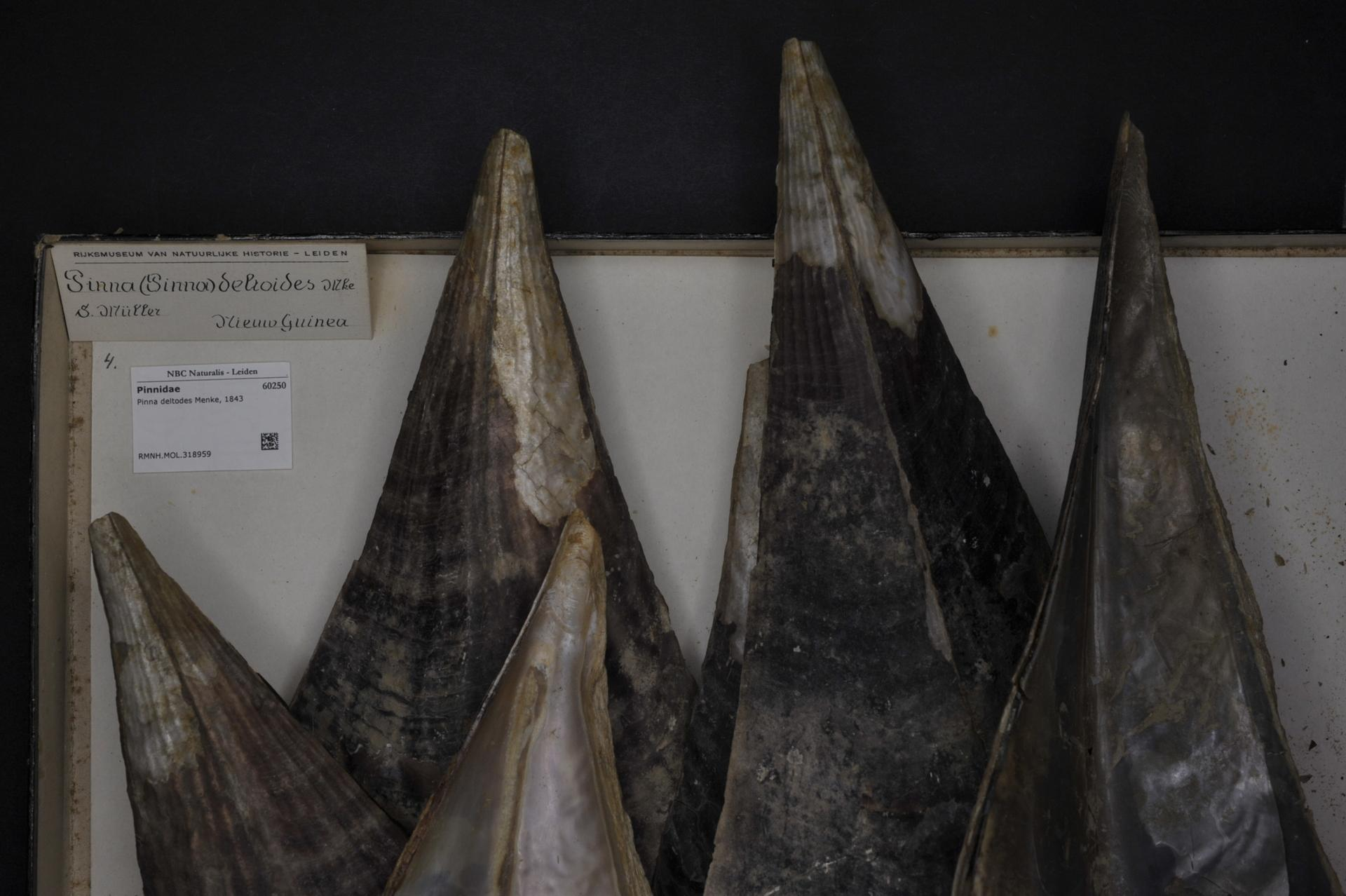
Pinna deltodes

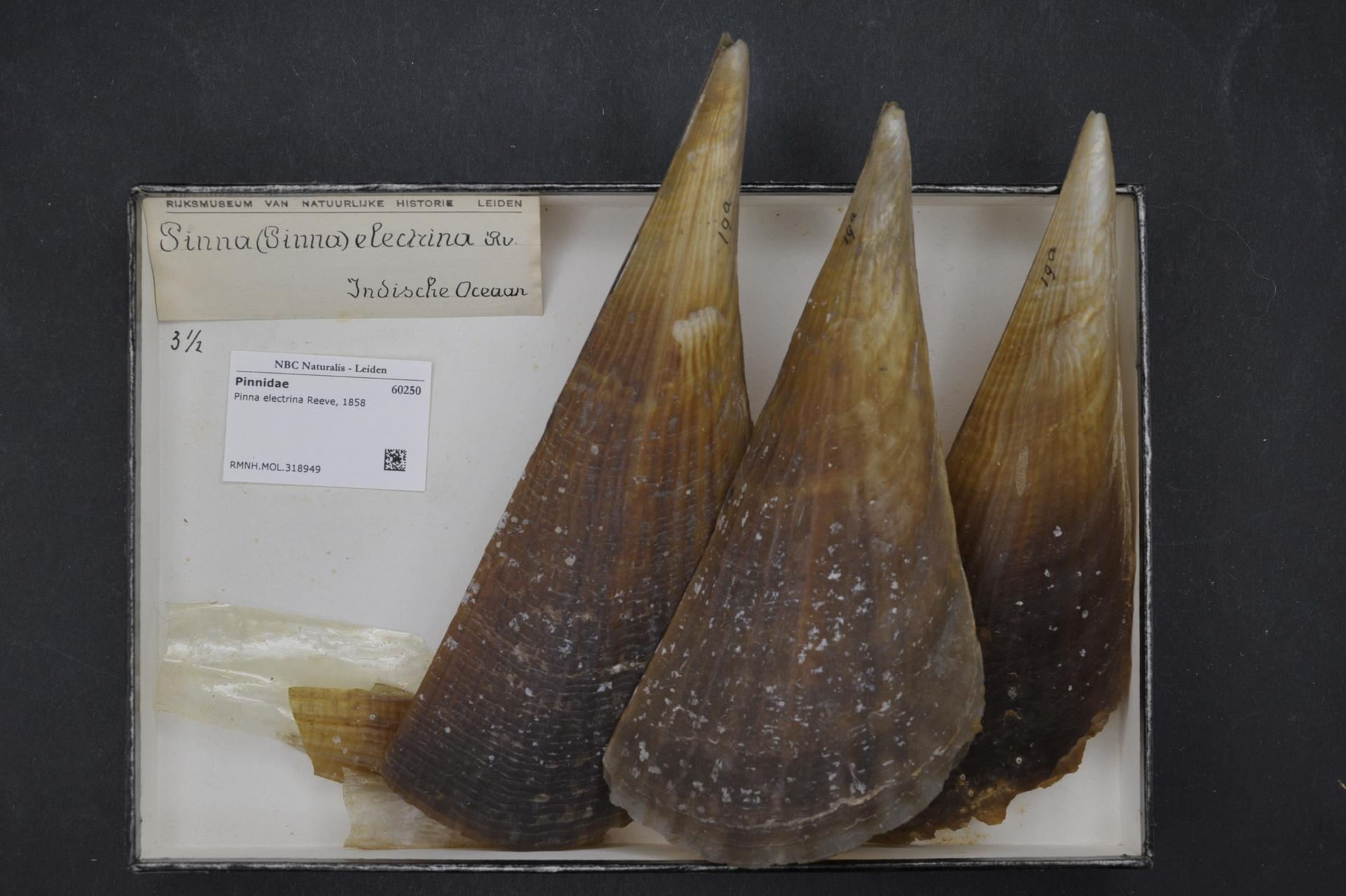
Pinna electrina

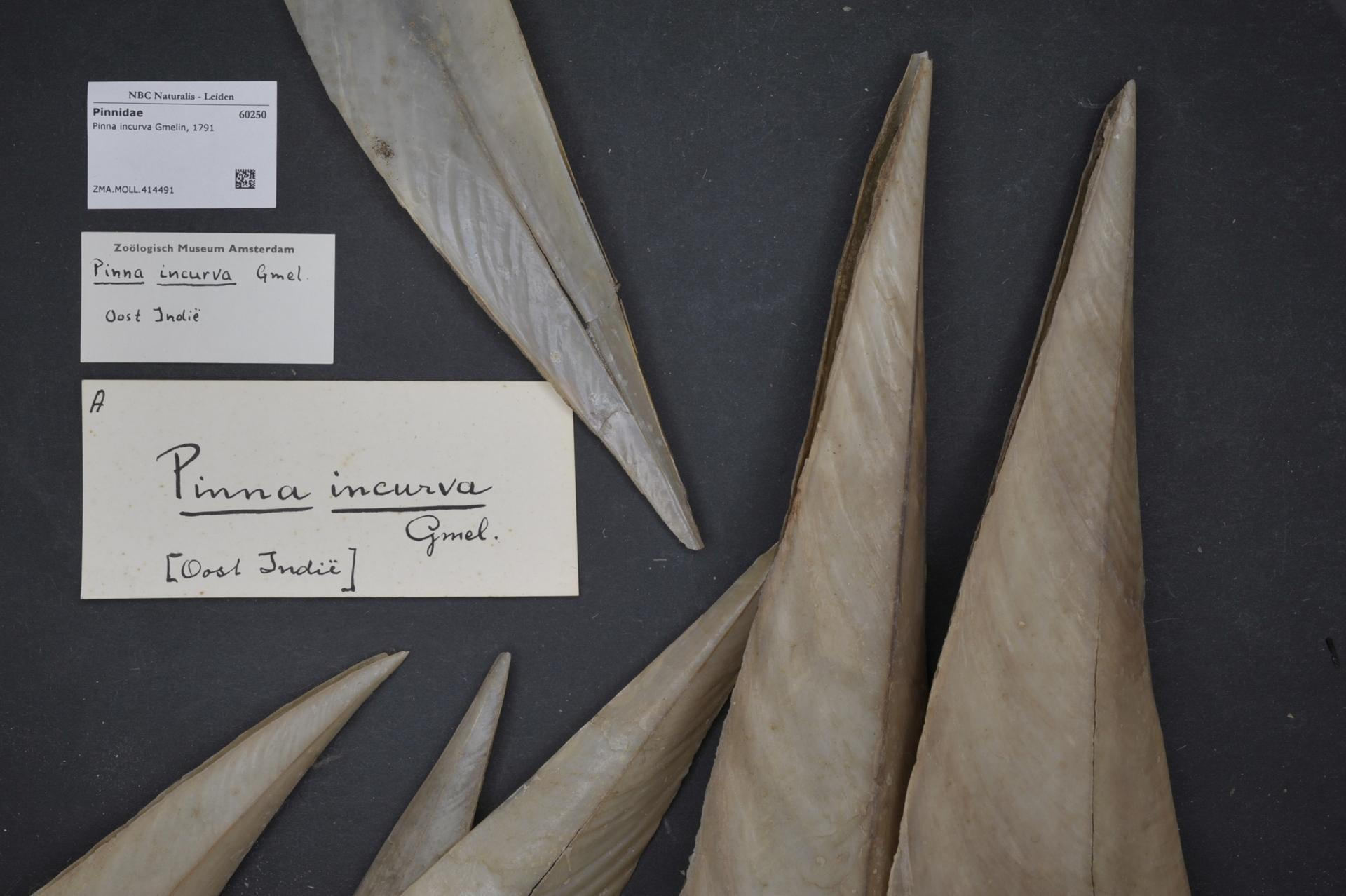
Pinna incurva

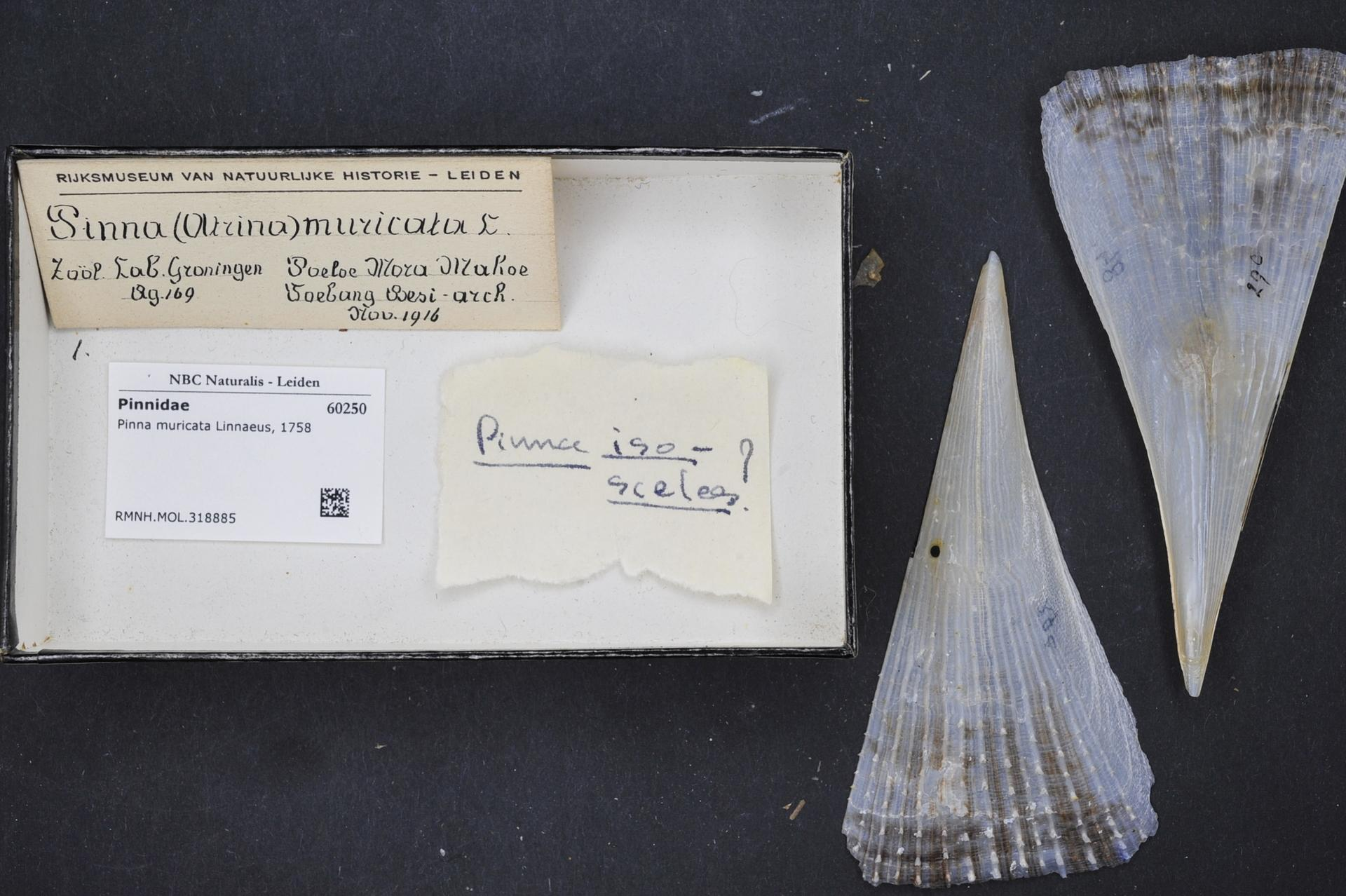
Pinna muricata

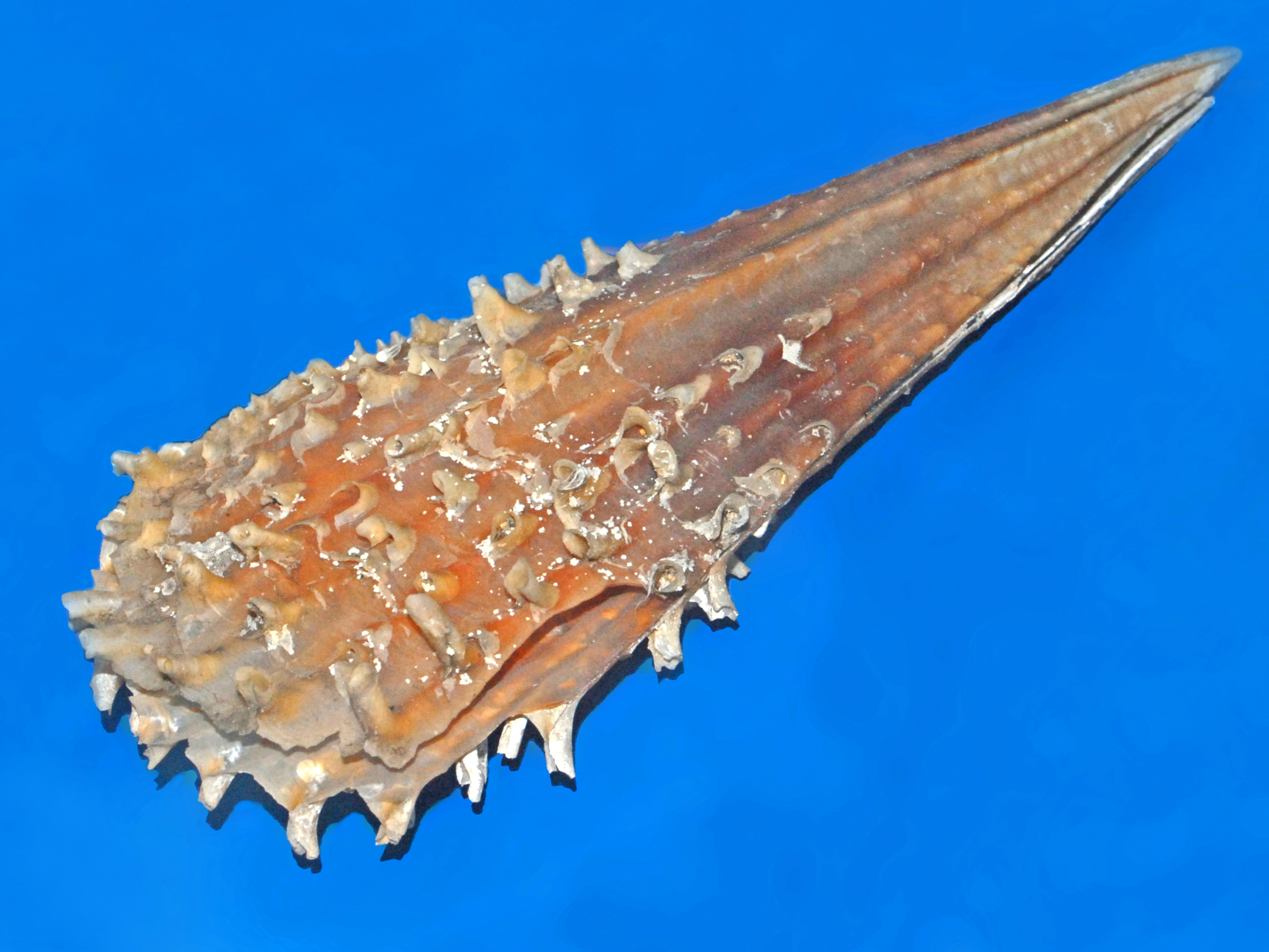
Pinna rudis

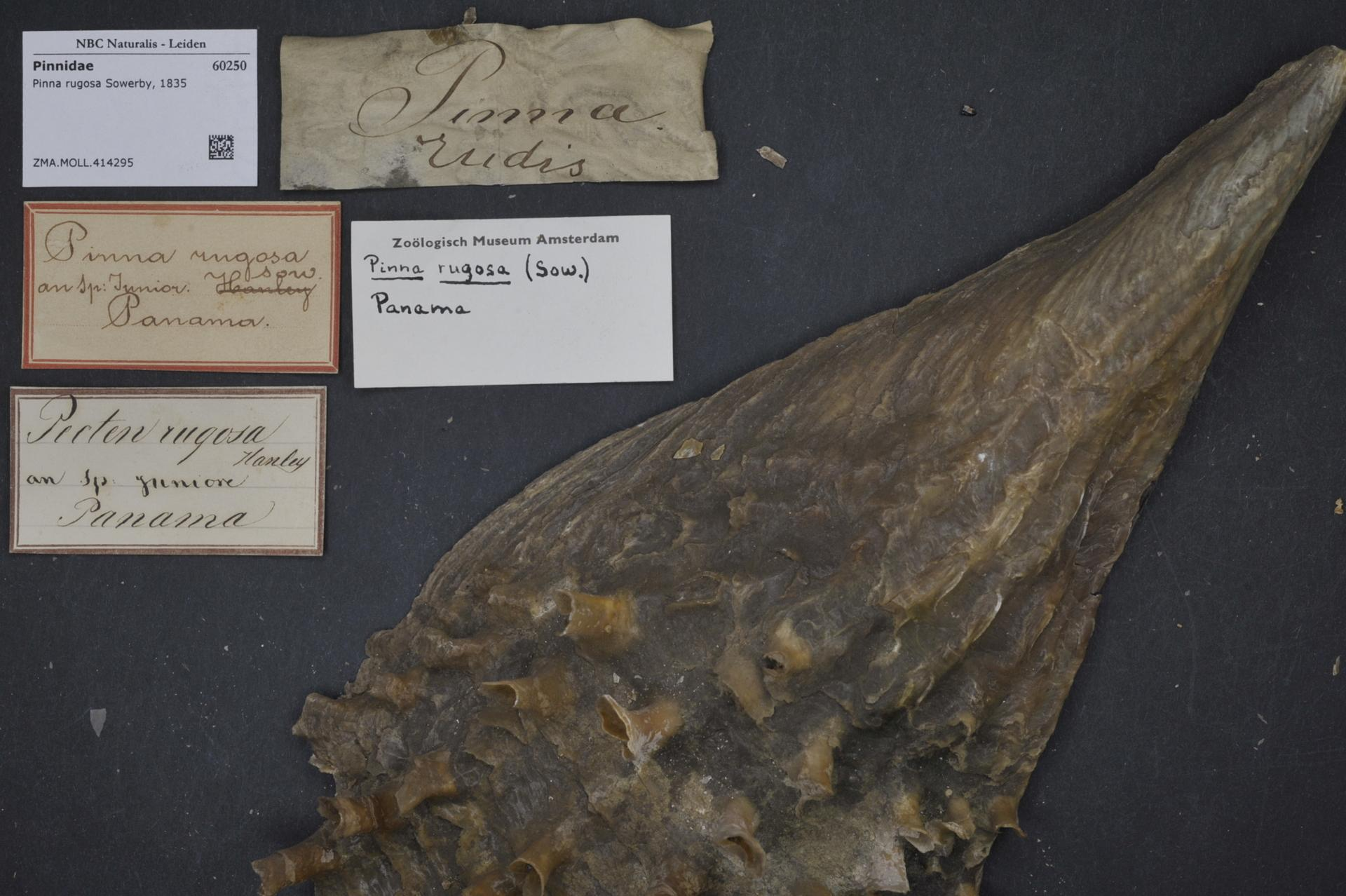
Pinna rugosa

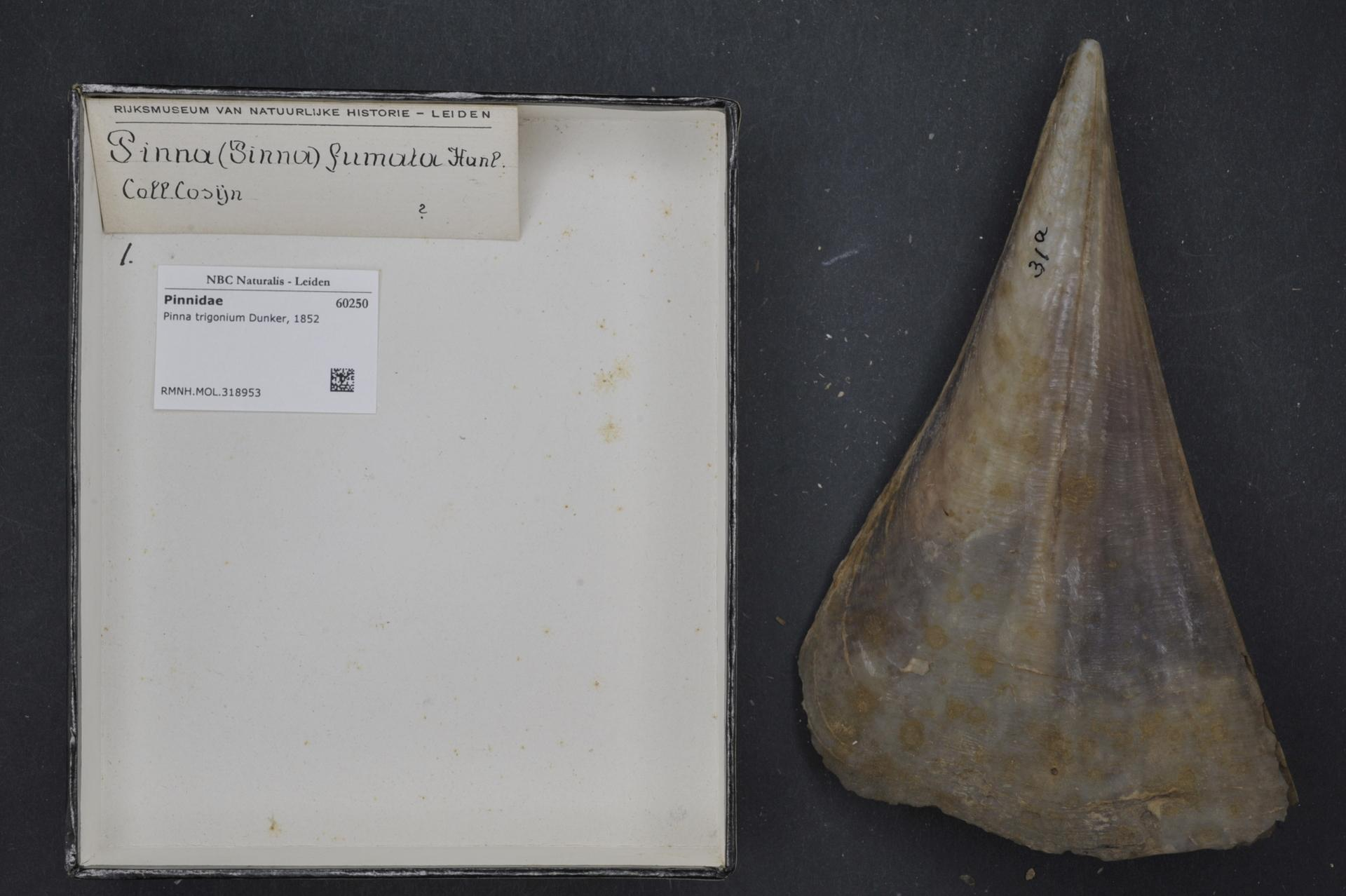
Pinna trigonium

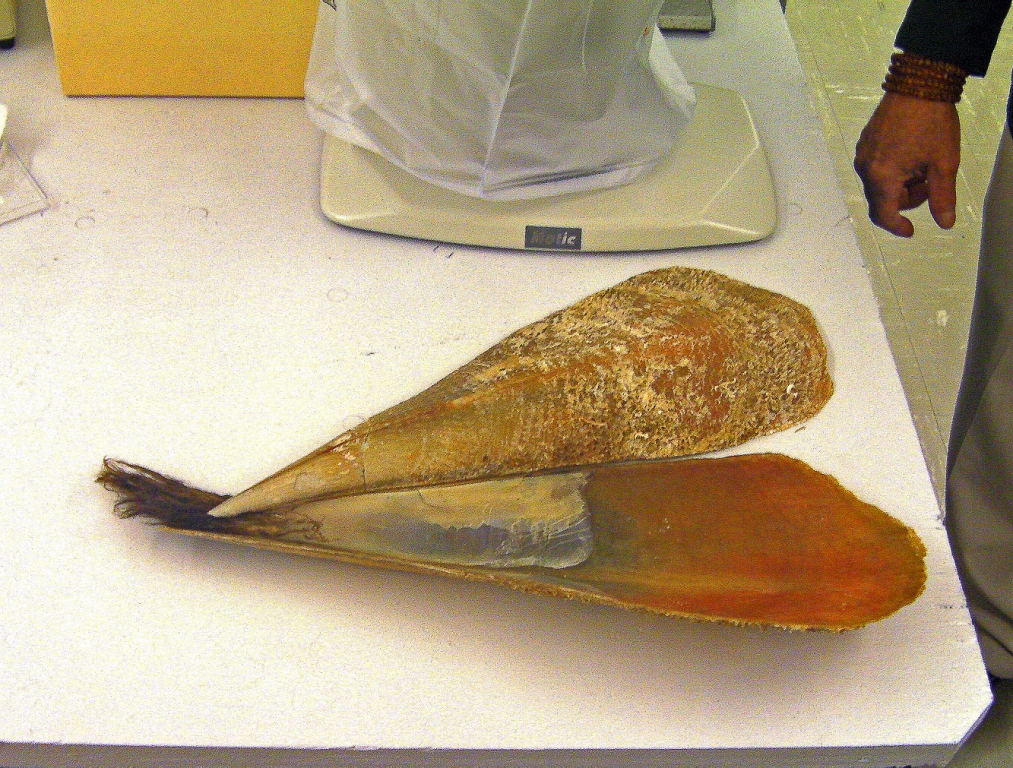
Pinna nobilis shell with byssus
