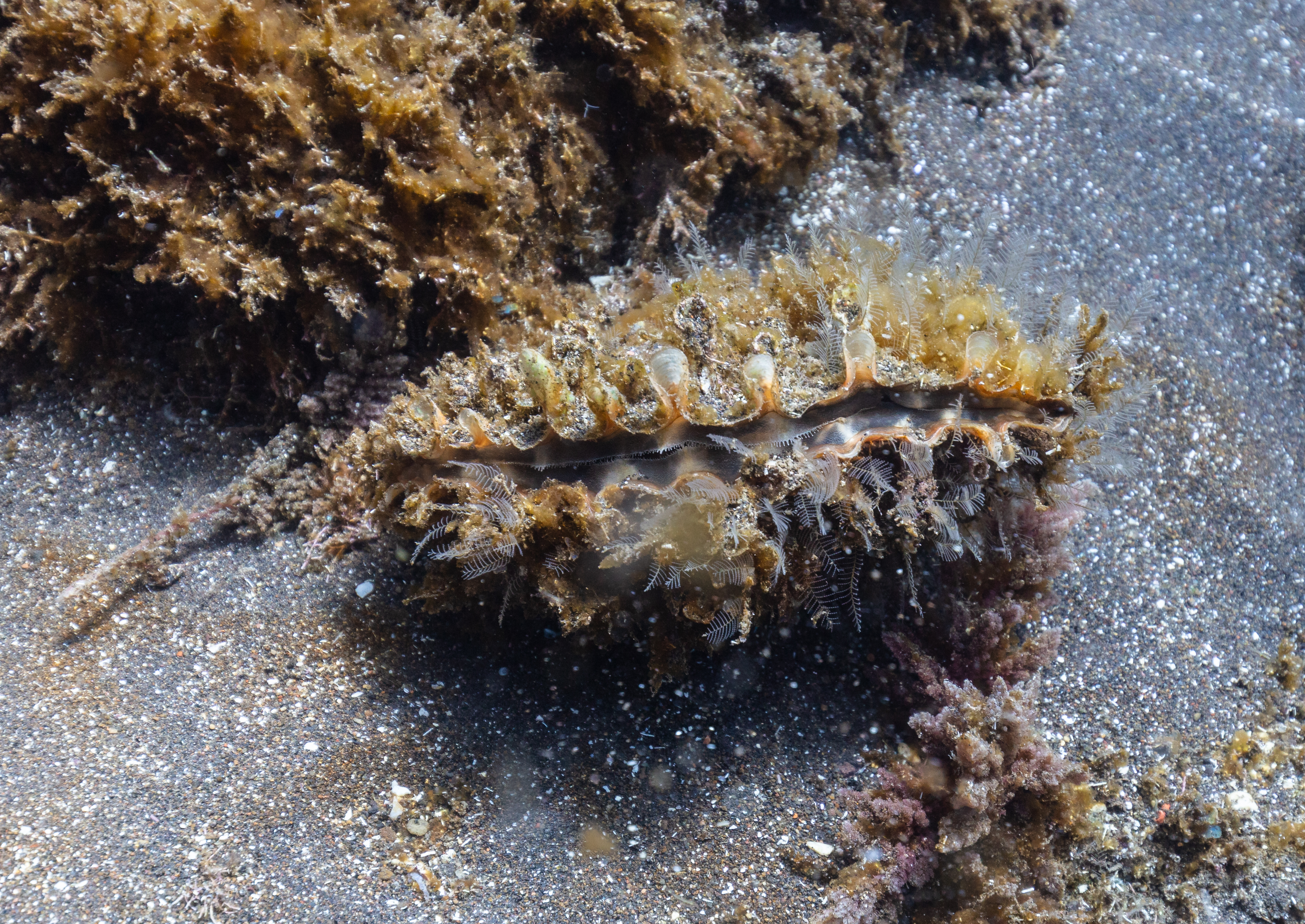
- Exemplar in Madeira, Portugal
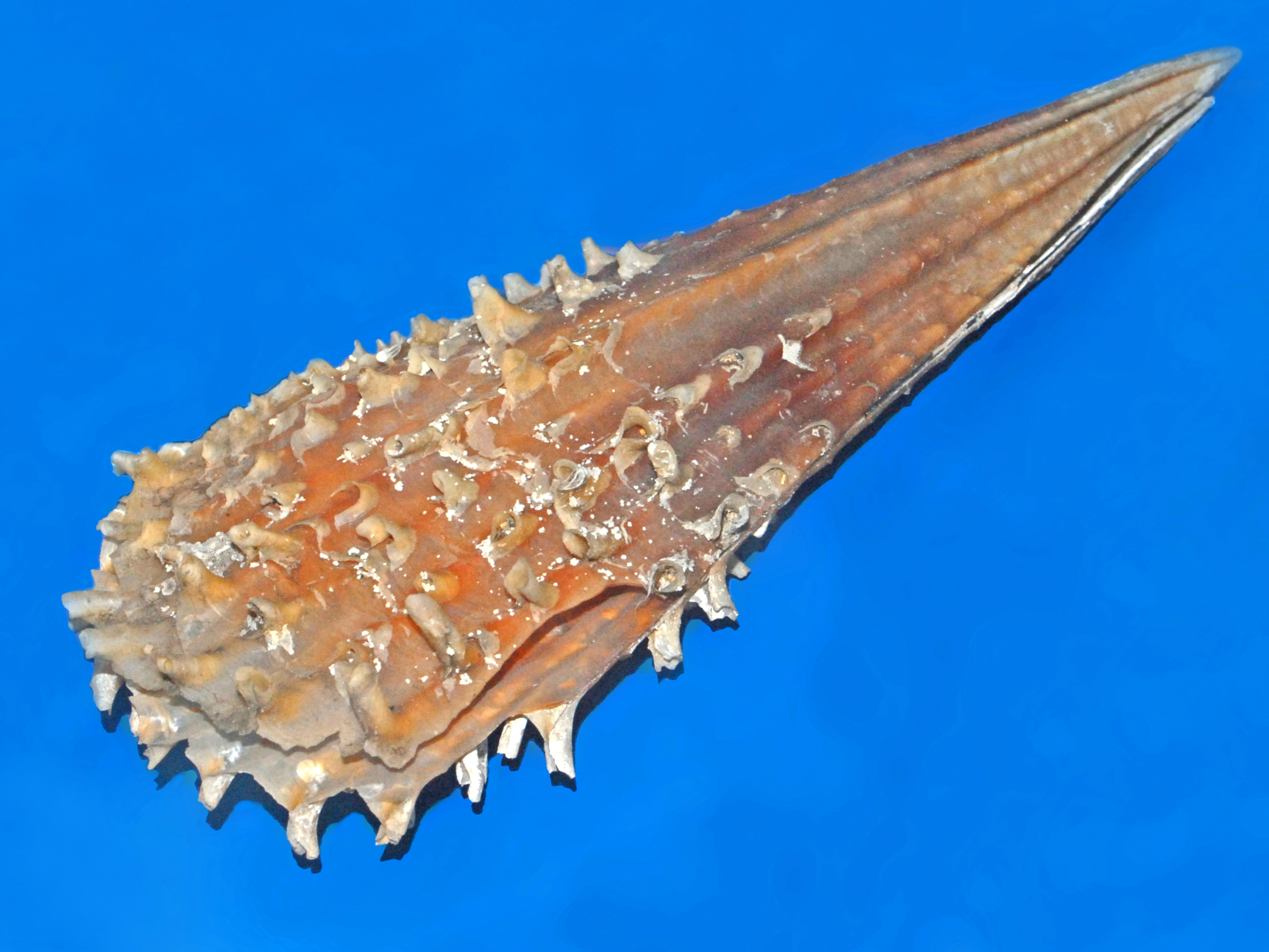
- Pinna rudis from Sicily, on display at the Museo Civico di Storia Naturale di Milano

Scientific classification
- Kingdom: Animalia
- Phylum: Mollusca
- Class: Bivalvia
- Order: Pteriida
- Family: Pinnidae
- Genus: Pinna
- Species: P. rudis

Binomial name
- Pinna rudis Linnaeus, 1758

Synonyms
- Pinna elongata Röding, 1798; Pinna ferruginea Röding, 1798; Pinna ferruginosa Röding, 1798; Pinna mucronata G.S. Poli, 1795; Pinna paulucciae A. de Rochebrune, 1883; Pinna rudis belma A. De Rochebrune, 1885; Pinna rudis blama A. De Gregorio, 1885

= Pinna rudis =

Species of bivalve

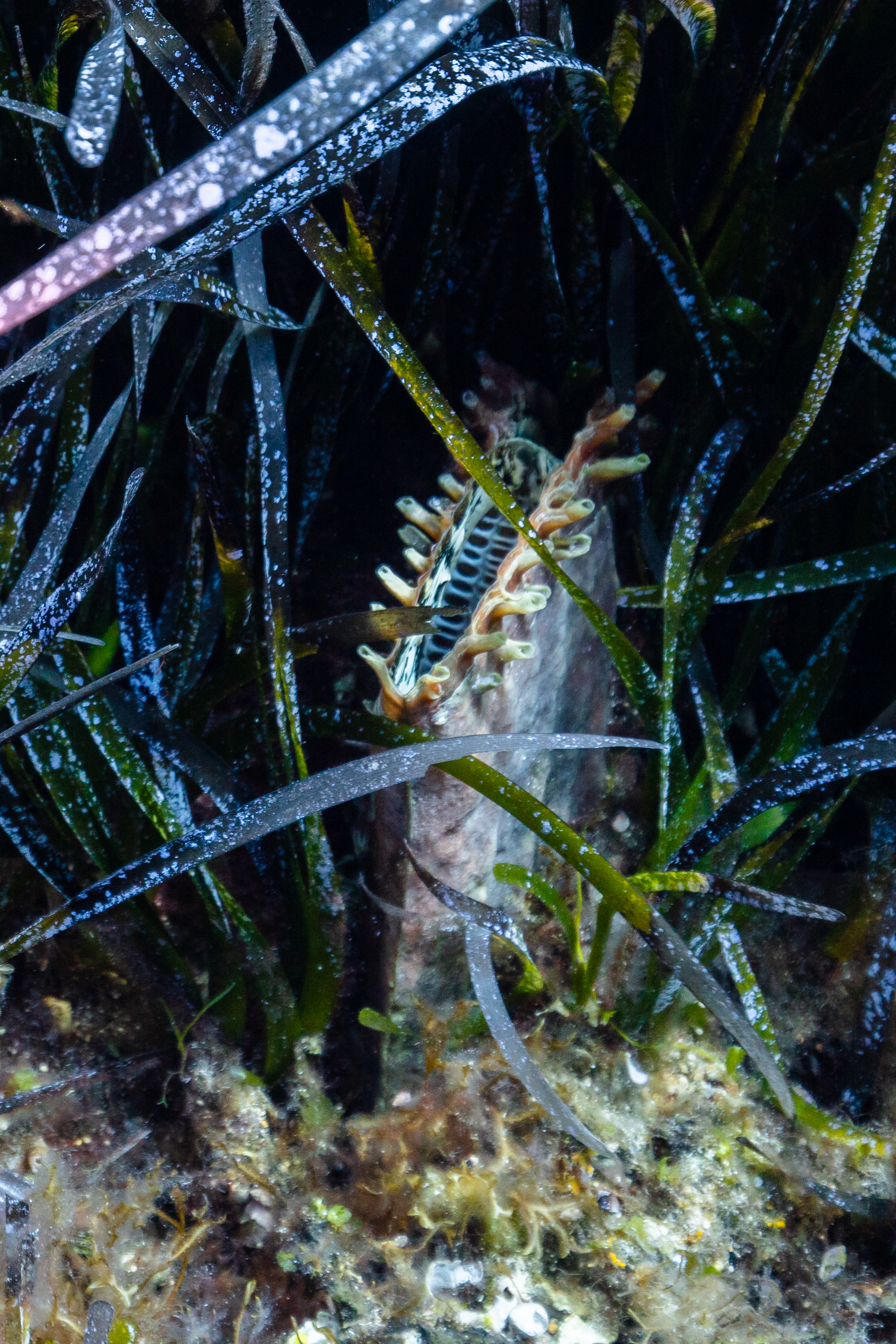
Hidden exemplar in Gozo (Malta)

Pinna rudis, the rough pen shell or spiny fan-mussel, is a species of bivalve mollusc in the family Pinnidae. It is the type species of the genus Pinna. Knowledge about this is sparse, with an absence of specific studies and literature.

== Description ==
Pinna rudis has a shell that commonly reaches a length of 25–30 cm (9.8–11.8 in). The rough pen shell has a pair of very fragile, long, triangular, wedge–shaped valves, covered with large, protruding scales arranged in quite regular rows. These scales are more prominent close to the opening of the shell. A half-dozen low ribs radiate from the pointed end and run the length of the valves. Said valves are almost symmetrical, toothless, and transparent on the ends. Their color is usually reddish brown.

The spiny fan-mussel lives with the pointed anterior end of its shell vertically anchored to rock or firm sediment by numerous byssus threads. The rear edge of the shell is rounded and free.

P. rudis may be confused with juveniles of Pinna nobilis, but the former shows a more triangular and robust shell, with fewer and larger protruding scales. Moreover, in P. rudis, the color is more brown or pink-orange, while in juveniles P. nobilis, it is homogeneously yellowish. Lastly, the adults of P. nobilis easily exceed the size of P. rudis and totally lose the protuberances on the surface of the shell. Also, the habitats of the two species are different, as P. nobilis can be found on muddy or sandy bottoms, while P. rudis prefers rock crevices.

== Distribution ==
This species is found in the eastern Atlantic Ocean (Azores, Saint Helena, Morocco), in the Mediterranean (Strait of Gibraltar, Almeria, Lipari, Sicily, Croatia, Tyrrhenian Sea, Ionian Sea), in the Black Sea and in the Caribbean waters, ranging from the Gulf of Mexico and southern Florida to the West Indies and Bahamas.

== Habitat ==
This species lives in small patches of sand in rocky bottoms and in rock crevices, at depths ranging from the surface to 60 m.

== Biology ==
Like almost all other bivalves, this species is a filter feeder. Water is drawn into the shell from above and passed over the ctenidium before being expelled into the open water at the exposed part of the shell. It is a hermaphrodite, the gonads producing both sperm and ova. The larvae are planktonic and drift with the currents.
