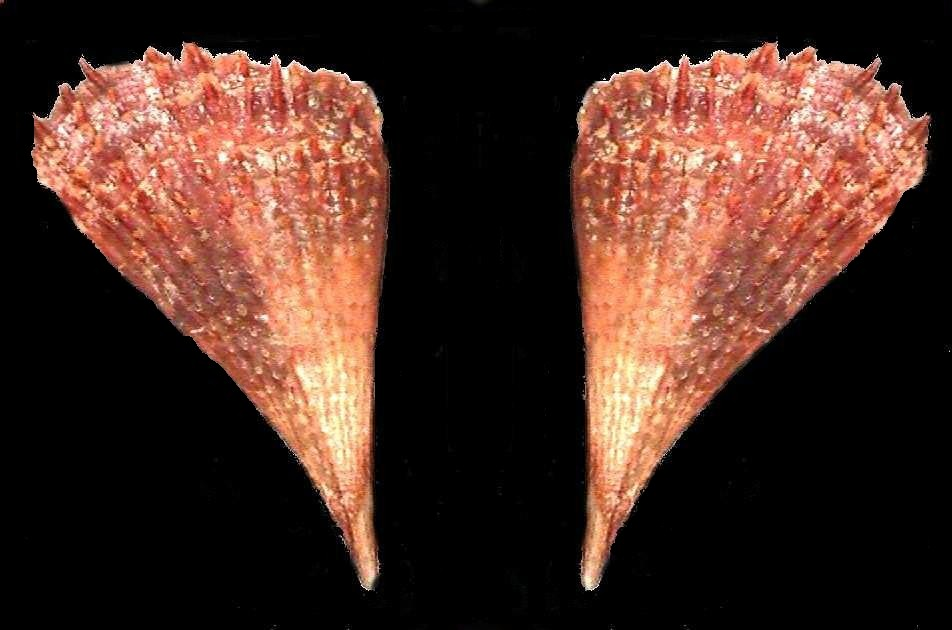

Conservation status
- Secure (NatureServe)

Scientific classification
- Kingdom: Animalia
- Phylum: Mollusca
- Class: Bivalvia
- Order: Pteriida
- Family: Pinnidae
- Genus: Pinna
- Species: P. carnea

Binomial name
- Pinna carnea Gmelin, 1791

Synonyms
- Pinna degenera Link, 1807; Pinna flabellum Lamarck, 1819; Pinna pernula Röding, 1798

= Pinna carnea =

Species of bivalve

Pinna carnea, commonly called the amber pen shell, is a species of bivalve mollusc in the family Pinnidae.

== Description ==
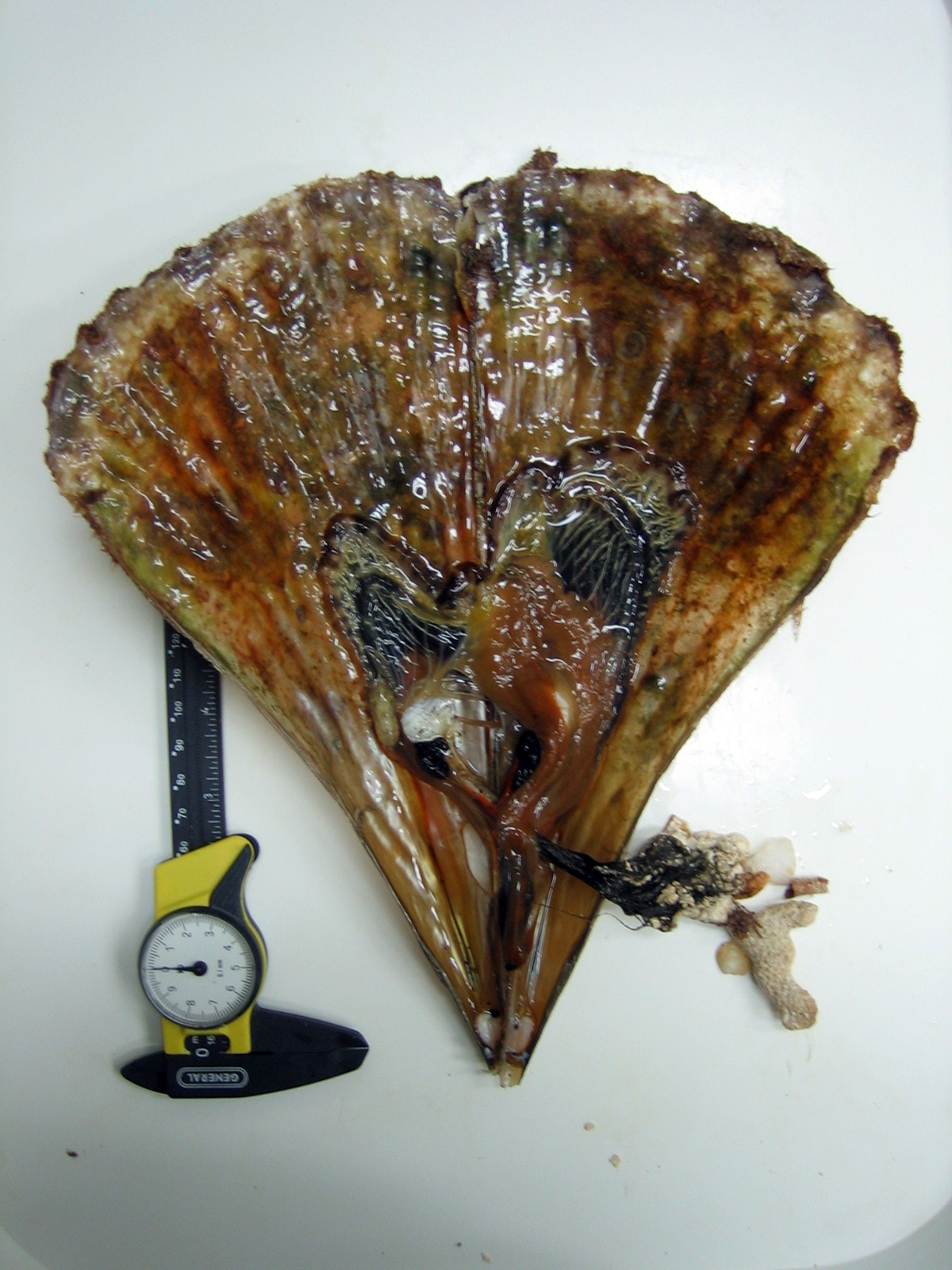
Opened amber penshell bivalve with byssal attachment

The amber pen shell has a pair of long, thin translucent valves held together by ligaments that run along the entire dorsal side of the bivalve. The bivalve is triangular with 8 to 12 low ribs radiating from the pointed anterior end (or umbo) to the large posterior edge. The exterior of the shell is usually a dull orange amber-like color and may have fragile, scale-like spines that often become eroded over time. The anterior end is usually buried and attached by byssal threads, whereas its wider posterior gaping end extends above the sea bottom surface to facilitate filter-feeding. Algae (e.g. Lobophora variegata) and invertebrates such as sponges and encrusting corals tend to grow on the exposed part of the shell and may camouflage it very well.

== Distribution and habitat ==
The amber pen shell can be found in coastal western Atlantic waters, ranging from southern Florida across the Caribbean and the West Indies to Brazil.

The amber pen shell is benthic and usually occurs in medium to coarse sand or mixed substrata (sand, gravel, rocks), in fine calcareous sandy mud of eelgrass (e.g. Zostera spp.), in sandy substrata of turtle grass (e.g. Thalassia spp.) and other mixed-species seagrass meadows at depths usually between 2 and 15 metres (6 ft 7 in and 49 ft 3 in).

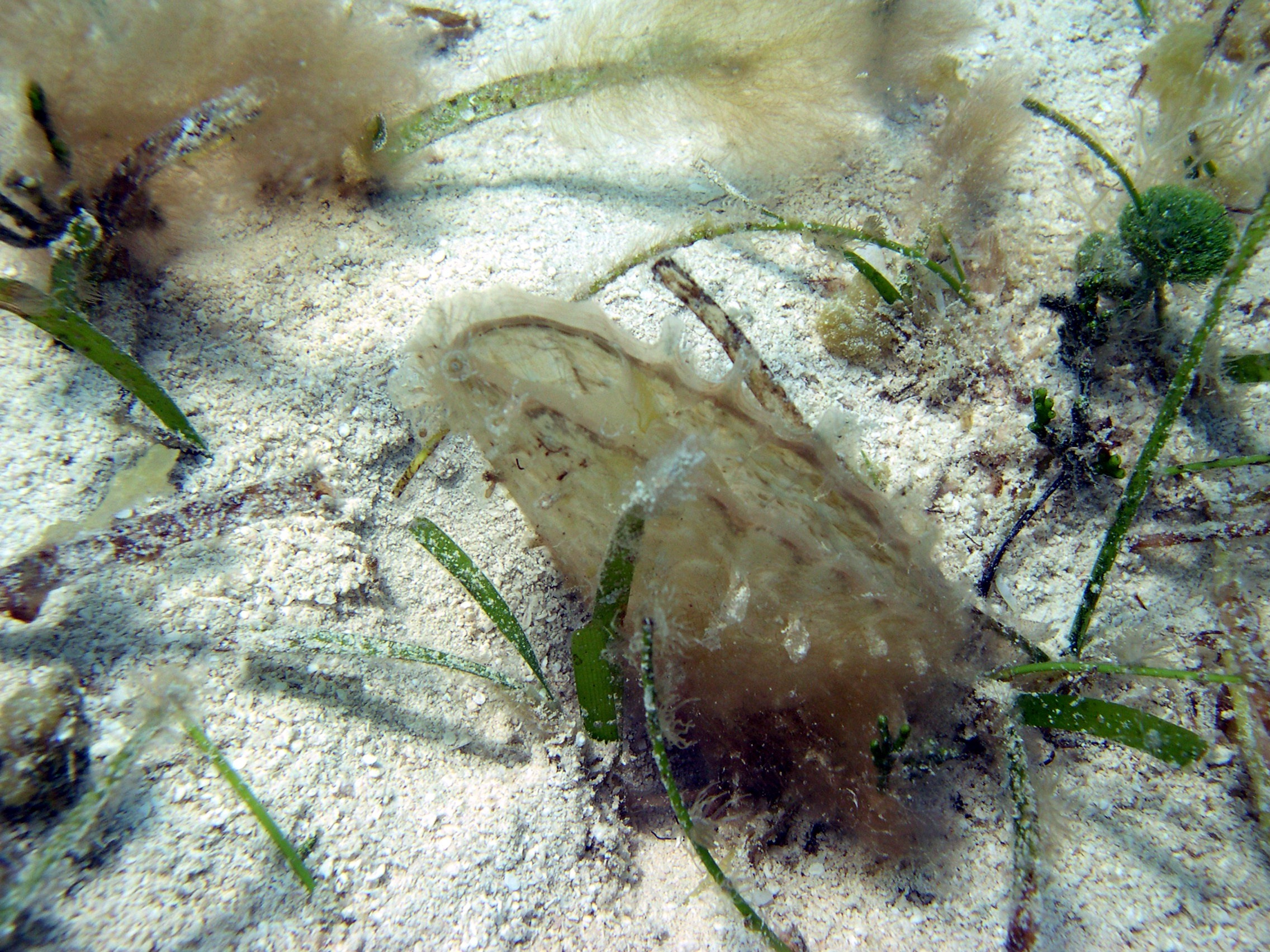
Newly settled Pinna carnea in a seagrass bed

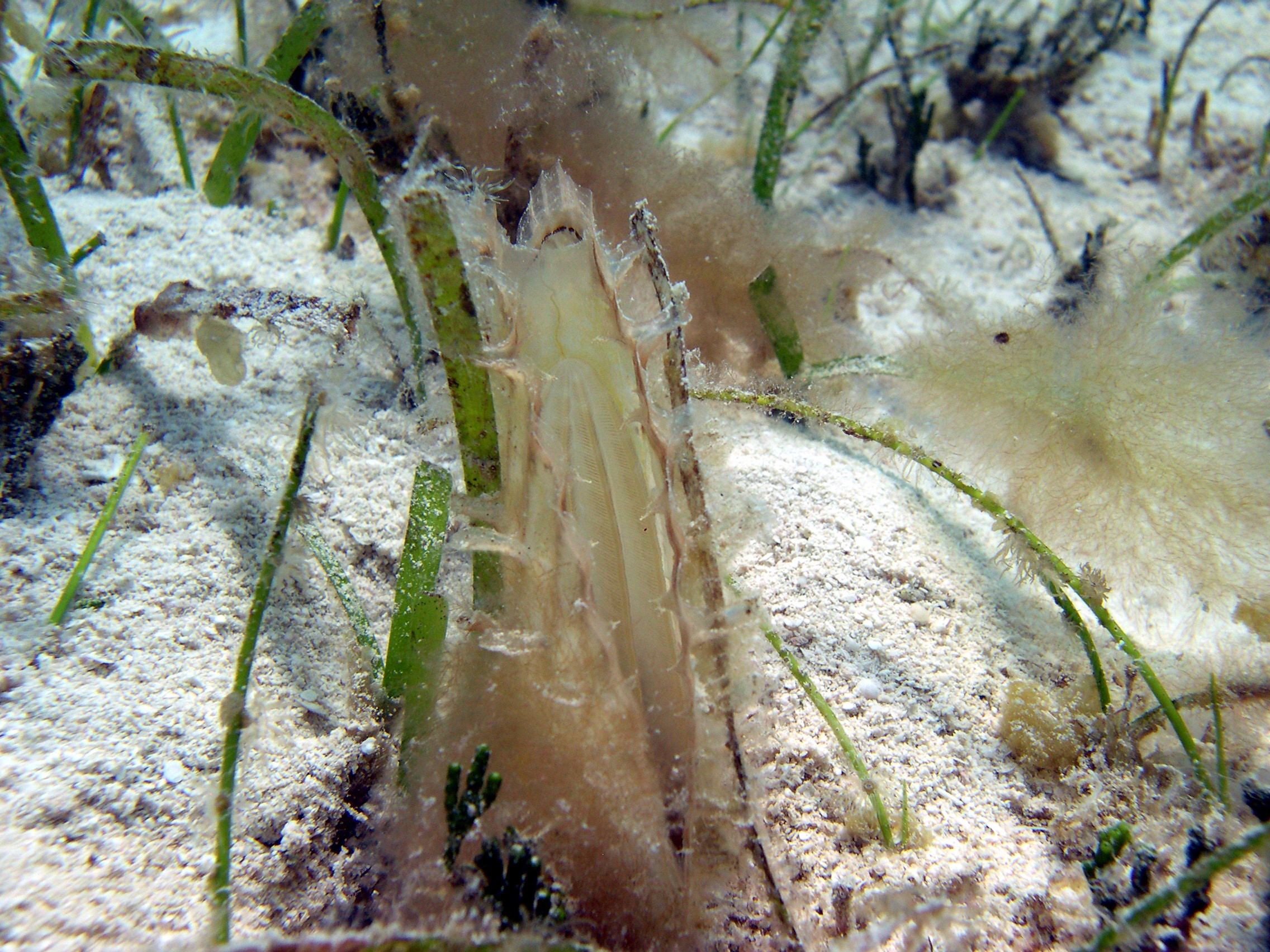
Bivalves grow quickly until a refuge in size is attained

== Filter-feeding ==
The amber pen shell burrows as it grows, but the wide posterior end of the shell always remains exposed so water from above the seafloor can be drawn through the inhalent chamber of the mantle cavity. Typical of bivalves, water is drawn over gills or ctenidium by the beating of cilia where oxygen from the water is absorbed. Suspended food and other water-borne nutrients also become trapped in mucus, which is then transported to the mouth, digested and expelled as feces. Unique gutter-like waste canals in the viscera of the inhalent chamber also help to keep gills and other organs clear from silt and other unwanted water-borne particules by expelling these as pseudofeces.

== Growth and predation ==
The amber pen shell may reach 30 cm (12 in) in length with shell growth being extremely rapid after settlement [up to 2.2 mm (0.087 in) in length/day] and growth slowing down as shells get large and attain a refuge in size [at around 15 cm (5.9 in)]. The exposed valves of amber penshells are subject to frequent damage as they often show breaks and scars. While its half-buried position facilitates filtering water from above silty bottoms, it also increases exposure to predators. Octopuses are likely important predators of amber pen shells.

== Reproduction and settlement ==
The amber pen shell is a hermaphrodite, the gonads producing both sperm and ova. The larvae are planktonic and drift with the currents. The shells of the planktonic larvae are transparent, pale golden or amber in color, and also triangular. Larvae likely settle anywhere they can attach byssal threads. The larval shells are quickly eroded after settlement and byssal attachment, with few adult shells ever found with remains of their larval shell stage. Amber pen shells are sessile and remain in the same spot for the rest of their lives, although dislodged individuals can re-establish themselves.

== Symbiosis ==
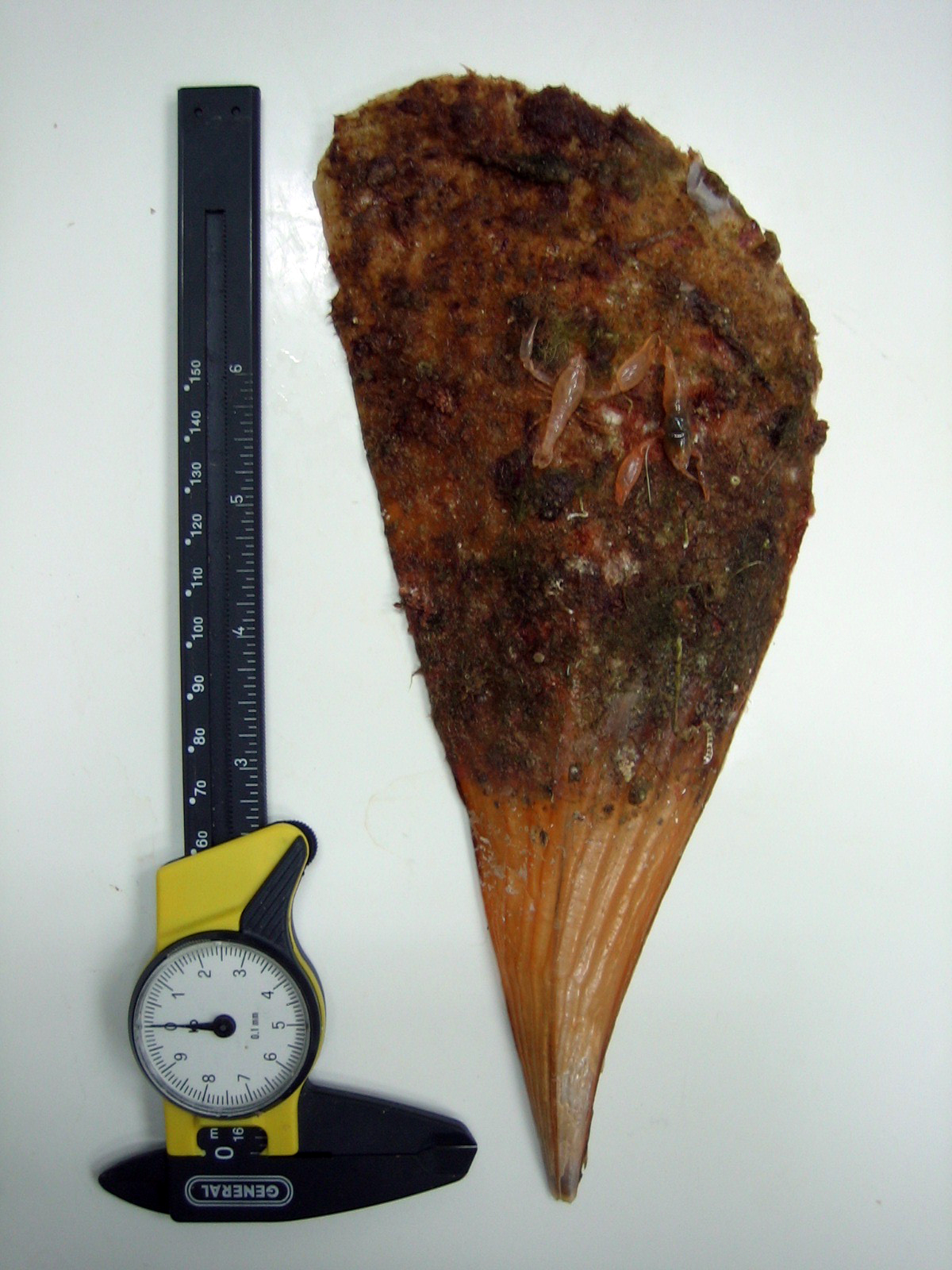
Amber penshell and symbiont shrimp

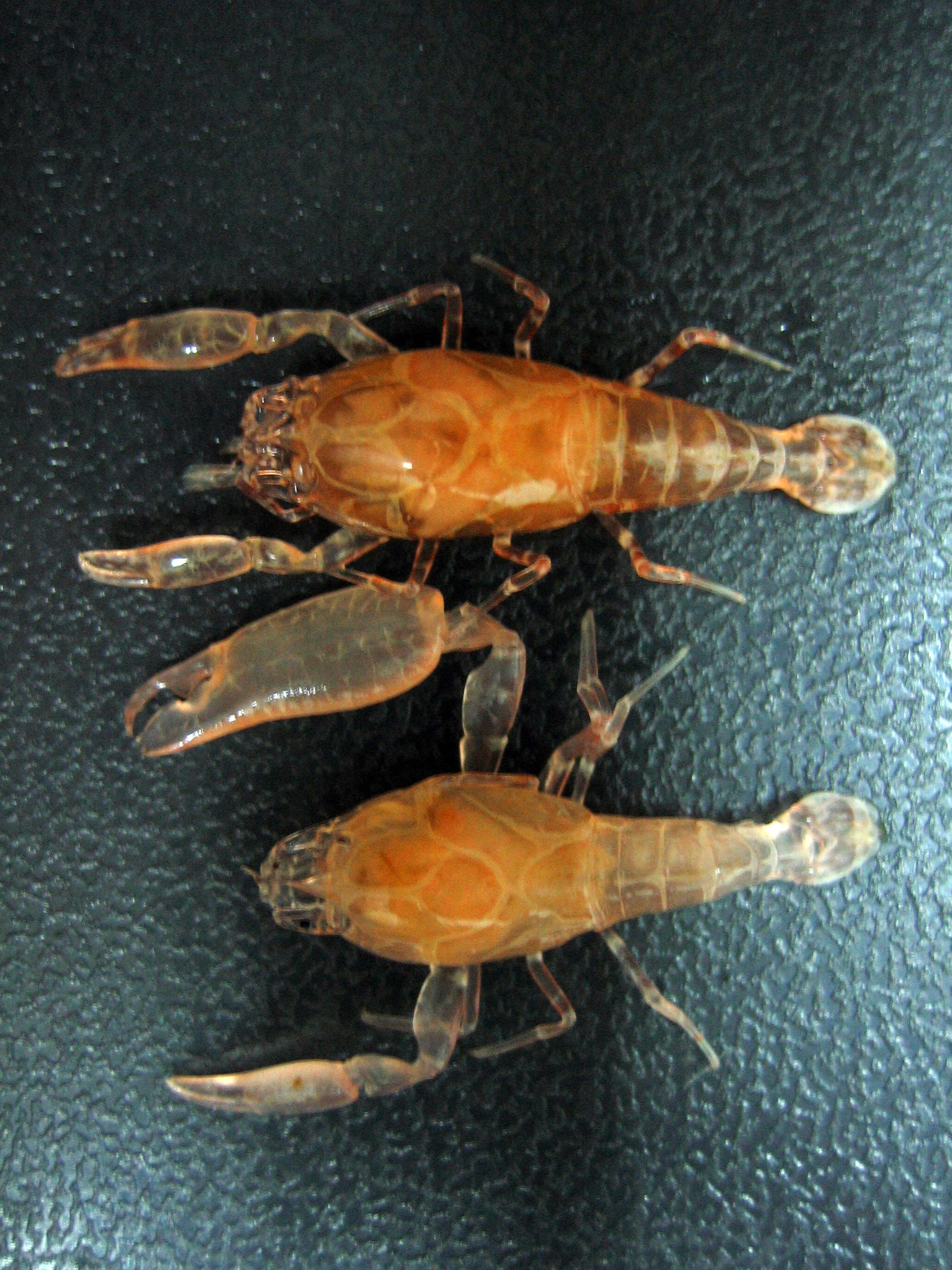
Female & male pontoniid symbionts

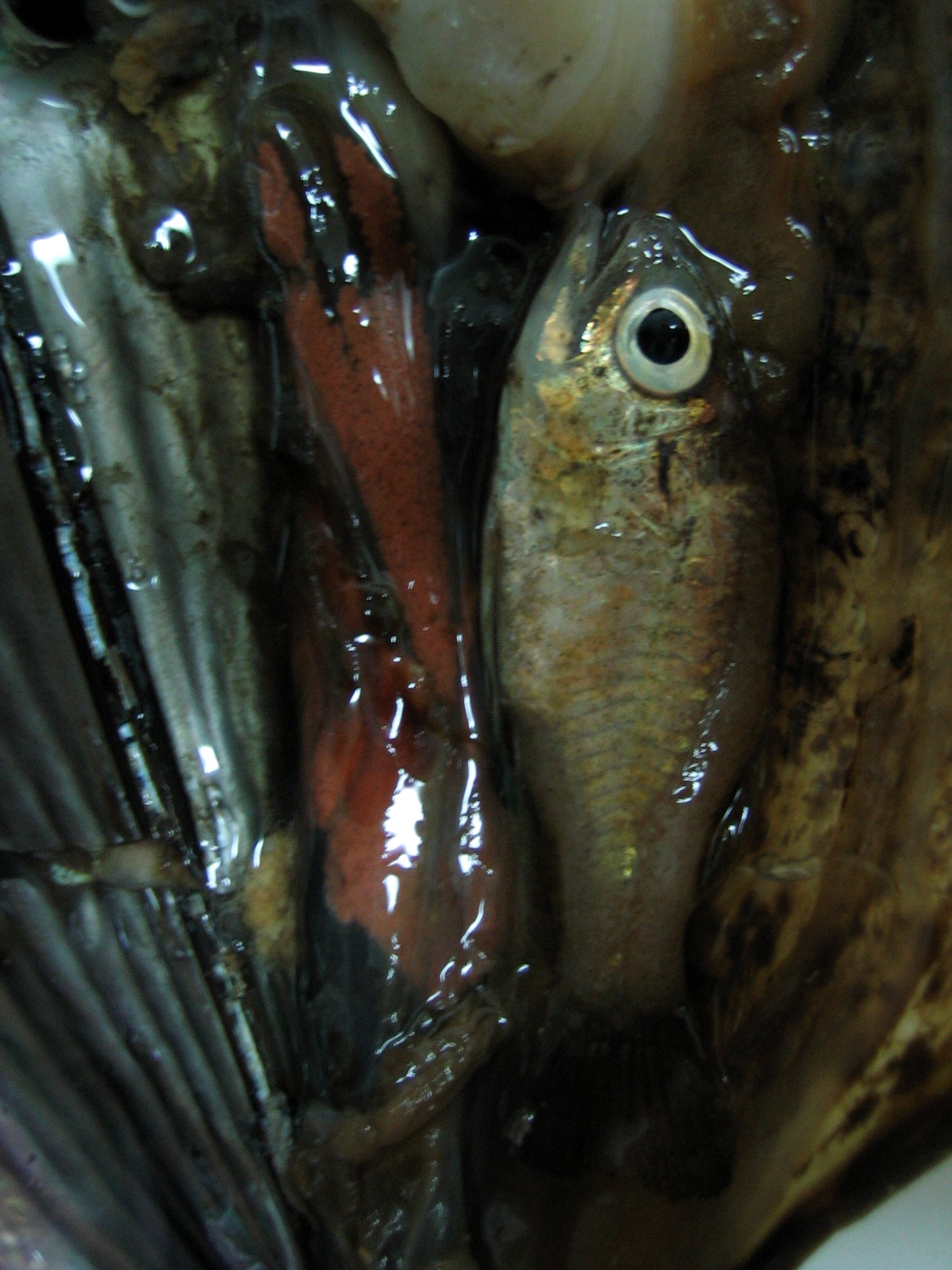
Cardinal fish inside mantle cavity

The amber pen shell may host a number of symbionts in its mantle cavity. Shrimp Pontonia mexicana (Palaemonidae), cardinalfish Astrapogon stellatus, pea crabs (Pinnotheridae) and sea anemones (Actiniaria) have all been found sheltered inside its shell.
