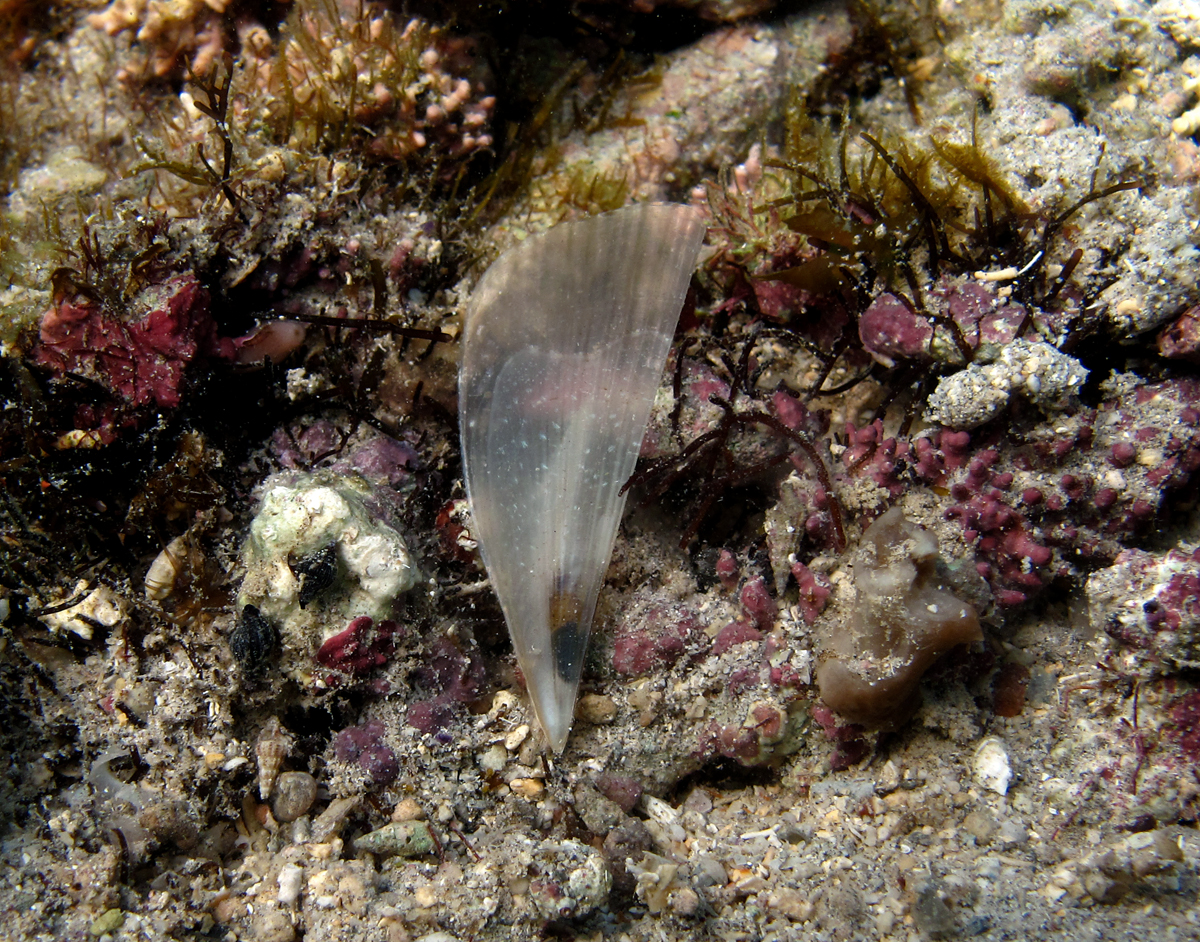

Scientific classification
- Kingdom: Animalia
- Phylum: Mollusca
- Class: Bivalvia
- Order: Pteriida
- Superfamily: Pinnoidea
- Family: Pinnidae
- Genus: Pinna
- Species: P. muricata

Binomial name
- Pinna muricata Linnaeus, 1758

Synonyms
- Atrina aequilatera (Martens, 1880); Pinna (Quantulopinna) muricata Linnaeus, 1758· accepted, alternate representation; Pinna aequilatera E. von Martens, 1880 (invalid: junior homonym of Pinna nobilis var. aequilatera Weinkauff, 1867); Pinna cancellata Mawe, 1823; Pinna hawaiensis Dall, Bartsch & Rehder, 1938; Pinna semicostata Conrad, 1837; Pinna zebuensis Reeve, 1858; Quantulopinna delsa Iredale, 1939; Quantulopinna delsa howensis Iredale, 1939

= Pinna muricata =

Species of bivalve

Pinna muricata is a species of bivalves belonging to the family Pinnidae.

The species is found in almost all oceans.
