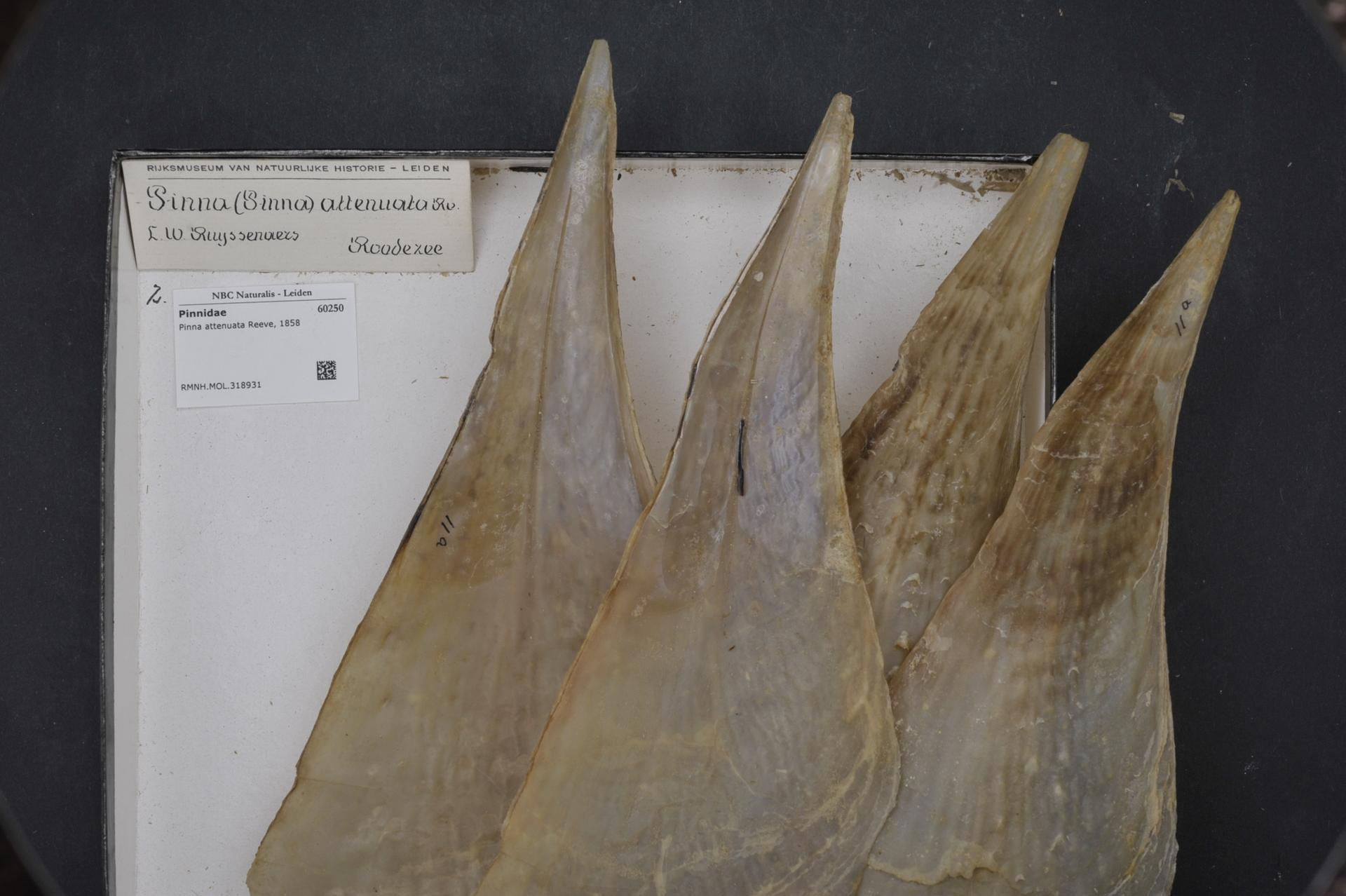

Scientific classification
- Kingdom: Animalia
- Phylum: Mollusca
- Class: Bivalvia
- Order: Pteriida
- Family: Pinnidae
- Genus: Pinna
- Species: P. attenuata

Binomial name
- Pinna attenuata Reeve, 1858

Synonyms
- Pinna (Cyrtopinna) attenuata Reeve 1858· accepted, alternative representation; Pinna stutchburii Reeve 1859

= Pinna attenuata =

Species of bivalve

Pinna attenuata is a species of bivalves belonging to the family Pinnidae. It has an elongate, triangular shell shape, is radially wrinkled anteriorly, radially ribbed posteriorly, and is usually unscaled. It is yellow-olive in colour when alive.

The species has been found in waters off the coast of Japan, Tanzania, and in Malesia.
