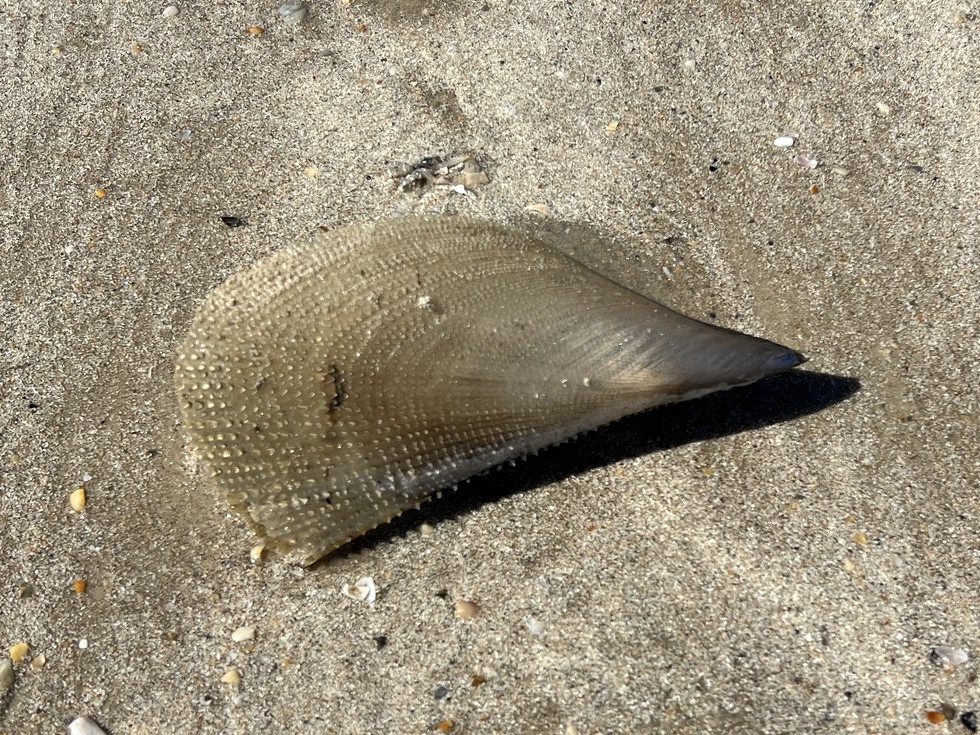

Conservation status
- Secure (NatureServe)

Scientific classification
- Kingdom: Animalia
- Phylum: Mollusca
- Class: Bivalvia
- Order: Pteriida
- Family: Pinnidae
- Genus: Atrina
- Species: A. serrata

Binomial name
- Atrina serrata (Sowerby, 1825)

= Atrina serrata =

Species of bivalve mollusc in the family Pinnidae

Atrina serrata, or saw-toothed pen shell, is a species of bivalve mollusc in the family Pinnidae.

== Description ==
The shell of a saw-toothed pen shell, similar to other pen shells, has a distinctive wedge or fan-like shape. The shell can be up to 10 in (25 cm) long and 4 in (10 cm) wide, and is relatively fragile. Running along the shell are 30 radiating ribs of sharp spines that make the rear margin saw-toothed, hence the common name. The shell can be translucent gray, green, tan, or brown. The pen clam lives somewhat buried in the sediment, with tufts of byssal threads from the front end attaching it to buried rocks and shells.

== Distribution and habitat ==
The saw-toothed pen shell can be found along the Atlantic coast of North America, ranging from North Carolina to Texas, Mexico, and the West Indies. The pen shell has also been found just off the Bay of Bengal, in the Chilika Lagoon in India. Within this range, the pen shell is found in muddy sediments near the low tide line and below at shallow depths.

== Culinary importance ==
In some parts of Mexico, the adductor muscle of the saw-toothed pen shell is harvested and sold as canned scallops.
