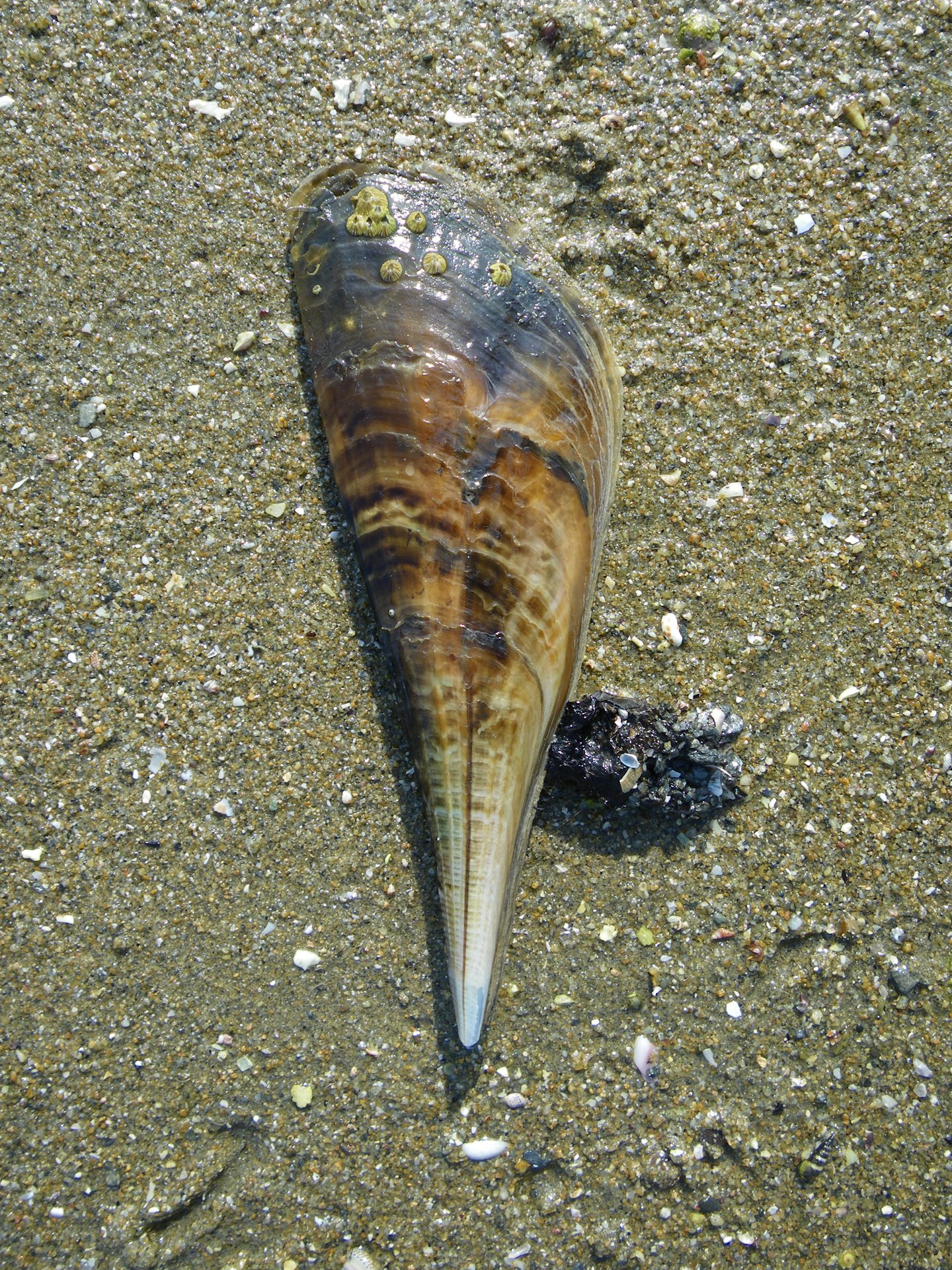

Scientific classification
- Kingdom: Animalia
- Phylum: Mollusca
- Class: Bivalvia
- Order: Pteriida
- Family: Pinnidae
- Genus: Pinna
- Species: P. bicolor

Binomial name
- Pinna bicolor Gmelin, 1791

Synonyms
- Atrina bicolor (Gmelin, 1791); Pinna cochlearis H. Fischer, 1901

= Pinna bicolor =

Species of bivalve

Pinna bicolor, also known as bicolor pen shell, razorfish, razor clam, or pen shell, is a species of large saltwater clam in the family Pinnidae. It is commonly found in shallow waters up to 50 m (160 ft) deep. It can be found embedded in firm muddy intertidal sediments, seagrass beds, and reef flats along continental and island shores.

== Description ==
P. bicolor have thin, elongated triangular shells that narrow to a point and range in color from light yellow-brown to dark brown. They are often overlooked as most of the shell is often buried with only about 2–3 cm of it sticking out of the ground. Glands near the buried end of the shell secrete byssus threads which allow the P. bicolor to attach itself to buried rocks and stones to anchor itself to the ground. When embedded in mud, the shell projects a fan shape as it is known to bury itself with the pointed end down. This earns it the moniker of "razor clam" in Australia due the danger these strong shells pose to waders and their abundance at low tide. They are generally known as "razorfish" in South Australia.

With a bilaterally symmetric body, the shells of a P. bicolor have an average length of 40 cm (16 in) with a maximum length of 50 cm (20 in). Its major organs are small and located at the pointed end that is buried deep in the ground where it is difficult for most predators to reach.

== Distribution ==
Pinna bicolor is native to Kwazulu-Natal, South Africa, and is commonly found in shallow waters up to 50 m (160 ft) deep. It also inhabits tropical zones from 35^{o}N–37^{o}S and 29^{o}E–154^{o}W; occurs from the south and eastern African coasts, Madagascar, the Red Sea, the Persian Gulf and India, as well as spanning from Japan to southern Australia and the whole East Indies. It is generally absent from mid-oceanic islands such as those in the central Indian Ocean. It occurs most commonly at depths of 20 m (66 ft) at low population densities of 2–5 per square meter, likely because they occur in environments with low nutrient concentrations.

Their habitat temperatures generally range between 27–30 °C and salinity ranges from 28–33 parts per thousand. They sit partially embedded in firm muddy intertidal sediments, in seagrass beds, and atop reef flats along continental and island shores at depths of up to 50 m (160 ft). Since this species is bottom-living, changes in environmental conditions have not impacted them much.

== Life cycle ==
P. bicolor are gonochoric and release their gametes into the water for external fertilisation. These gametes form teleplanic veliger larvae that may be carried a great distance by currents to propagate the species. With an average growth rate of 1.42 cm (0.56 in) per month, they can attain shell lengths of approximately 17, 25, and 30 cm in 1, 2, and 3 years respectively and can reach a reproductive size of 15 cm (5.9 in) in shell length in just over a year.

They are long-lived with low reproductive investment, a maximum age of 18 years, and have a low mortality rate. Since there are no known external markers that depict age, the specimen ages of live pen shells can be determined by relating them to the total shell length.

P. bicolor is a filter feeder and feeds on plankton and other small organisms. At high tide, they slightly open their shells to generate a current of water and sieve out their food with enlarged gills, then they tightly clamp to prevent water loss when the tide goes out.

P. bicolor is an important species in marine ecosystems that have significant impact for other lifeforms, as they prove to be both a habitat and food source. P. bicolor colonise diverse communities of plants and animals. Seaweed and encrusting creatures often settle on the portions of the P. bicolor that stick out above the sand, even while they are alive. Such creatures include tiny crabs and shrimp which are known to utilise the clams as a shelter and food supply.

== Economic value and threats ==
P. bicolor are occasionally collected for food by coastal populations. The flesh of the razor clam can be eaten, although the size of the edible meat is trivial compared with the size of the shell. Because of overfishing and habitat destruction, the clams have been listed as vulnerable in various regions. Although edible, the P. bicolor can be affected by red tide and other harmful algal blooms, making it unsafe for human consumption.
