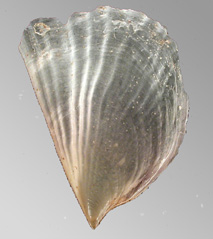

Scientific classification
- Kingdom: Animalia
- Phylum: Mollusca
- Class: Bivalvia
- Order: Pteriida
- Family: Pinnidae
- Genus: Streptopinna von Martens, 1850
- Species: S. saccata

Binomial name
- Streptopinna saccata (Linnaeus, 1758)

= Streptopinna =

Genus of bivalves

Streptopinna is an Indo-Pacific genus of bivalve molluscs characterized by a roughly triangular outline. There is only one species, Streptopinna saccata.

== Description ==
No two "baggy pen shells" are alike; they grow into unexpected shapes, conforming to the shape and position of other hard structures (rocks, coral skeletons, empty shells) in their immediate environment.

== Distribution ==
The single species can be found in warm waters of the tropical Indian Ocean and Western Pacific Oceans. In 2024, it was recorded for the first time in the Atlantic Ocean, at São Tomé Island, representing a significant range extension for the species.

== Habitat ==
Buried in sandy bottoms.
