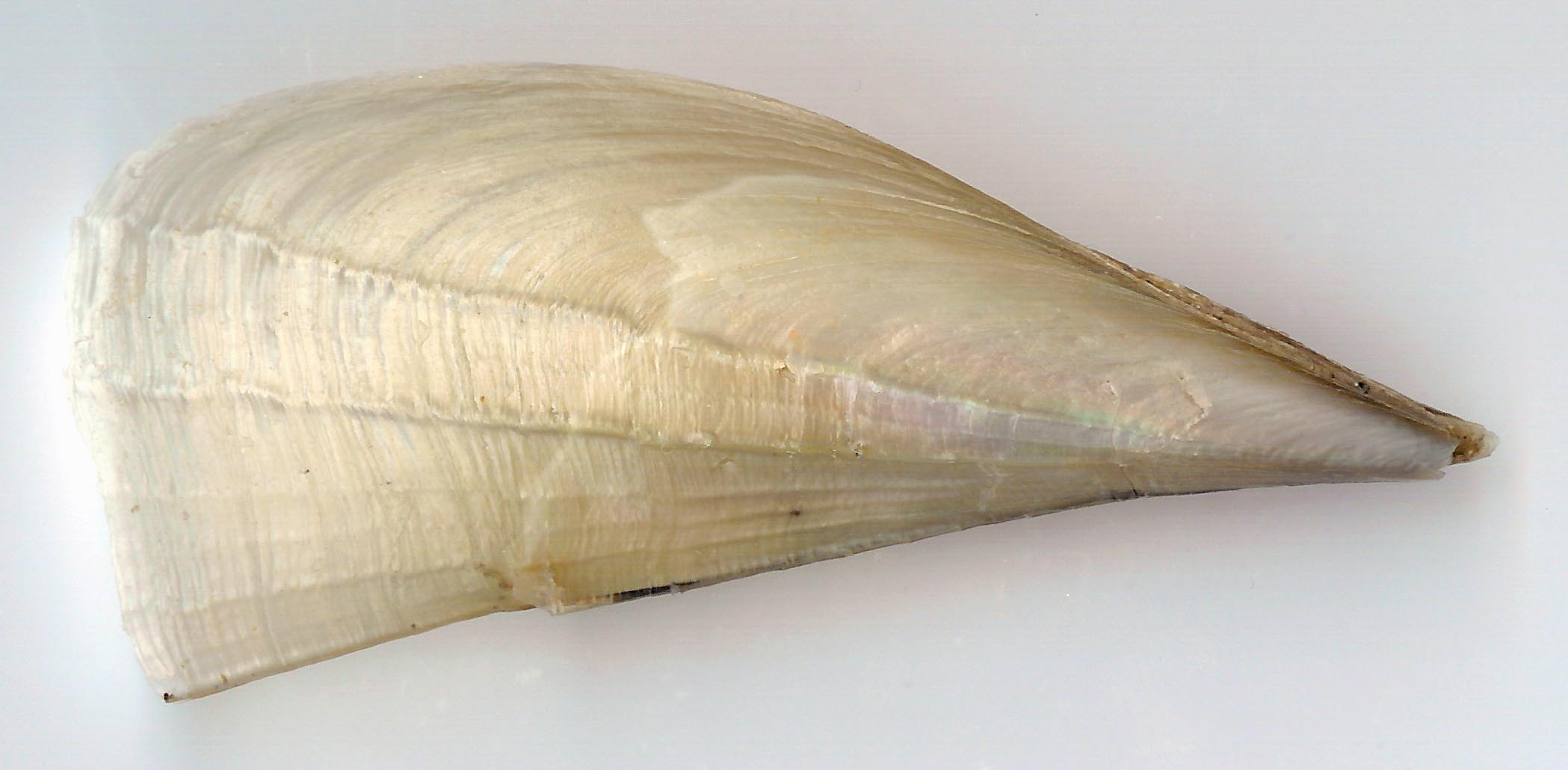

Scientific classification
- Kingdom: Animalia
- Phylum: Mollusca
- Class: Bivalvia
- Order: Pteriida
- Family: Pinnidae
- Genus: Atrina
- Species: A. fragilis

Binomial name
- Atrina fragilis (Pennant, 1777)

Synonyms
- Pinna fragilis

= Atrina fragilis =

Fan mussel

Species of bivalve

Atrina fragilis, the fan mussel, is a species of large saltwater clam, a marine bivalve mollusc in the family Pinnidae, the pen shells.

The fan mussel, Atrina fragilis is one of the largest (30 to 48 cm long) and rarest bivalve molluscs occurring in northern European waters and the only member of the family Pinnidae to inhabit UK waters. It is one of the largest (30 to 48 cm long) European bivalve molluscs. It is one of the rarest species of marine mollusc in the United Kingdom — so rare that surveys of nearly 9,000 sites around Britain between 1987 and 1998 found none. The fan mussel has a larval stage that is very difficult to identify due to the rarity of the specimen. Atrina fragilis is greatly affected by the industrialization of the fishing industry, and it has impacted the distribution of the rare species.

A short underwater video of Atrina fragilis and habitat; off the Welsh coast

== Description ==
The shell of the fan mussel tapers to a point at the umbos, and is very brittle. It is yellowish to dark brown with blackish patches. The two valves are equal and triangular in outline, with prominent gapes. The shell surface has a sculpture of concentric lines and 8 to 12 ribs, which may have fluted spines. Shells can reach up to 48 cm in length, and the largest individuals may be 10 to 12 years old. Atrina fragilis have also been found in the Mediterranean Sea.

== Taxonomy and Identification ==
Atrina fragilis has a large (30-48 cm in length by 15-24 cm wide), triangular, thin and fragile shell that tapers to a point. It has two valves that are equal with prominent gaps between the two shells and a hinge on the dorsal side. The shell has concentric growth and disturbance lines with 8-12 low, wavy ridges radiating out from the umbones. The shell colour is a light golden or yellow-brown to darker brown or chestnut.

== Habitat and Distribution ==
The most recent records of the rare bivalve Atrina fragilis are from Scotland in deep waters around the Shetland Isles and Orkney, and the west coast of Scotland, with scattered records from north-east Scotland, the south coast of England, the Channel Isles, Pembrokeshire in south Wales and Northern Ireland. They have also been recorded from north Scotland down to Mauritania, including the Iberian Peninsula, and into the Mediterranean. Atrina fragilis lives embedded in sublittoral fringe (approximately 400 m), subtidal muds, sandy muds or gravels. The fan mussel, like many other mussels, attaches to small stones by the secretion of strong byssal threads through their byssus gland to avoid being swept away in the ocean. Though embedded, between one and two thirds of the shell is buried, therefore leaving the fan mussel vulnerable to fishing trawlers.

== Biology ==
This species lives with the narrow half of its shell anchored in the sediment, but the large part of the fragile shell protrudes from the sea floor. Thus, unfortunately, it is vulnerable to damage by fishing trawlers. The species is also vulnerable to industrial activity.

Atrina fragilis prefers to reside on the sublittoral fringe and subtidal muds in order to embed itself or attach its byssal threads to small stones underneath the softer substrate. The biology of the mussel is not well understood, with information on its reproduction and early life-history particularly sparse. Efforts are being made to identify Atrina fragilis larvae to implement effective conservation of the rare species. Because of its brittle shell, the fan mussel is sensitive to the effects of benthic fishing gears and its distribution is believed to have been impacted by fishing over the past half century.

The shells are anchored to the sand by fine gold-coloured silk produced by special glands located in the muscular foot. This silk or byssus are fine threads which historically were used to make special royal fabrics. This was called Pinna silk or sea silk, although the species more frequently used was Pinna nobilis of the Mediterranean.

=== Lifecycle ===
The fan mussel is often solitary, but populations occur as small groups or patches of individuals forming small beds in rocky areas. Fan mussels typically eat phytoplankton through suspension feeding and have a lifespan of anywhere between 20–100 years. The fan mussel grows approximately 6 μm each day and the size can reach up to 770 μm before attaching to the substrate as adult bivalves.

=== Reproduction ===
The biology of A. fragilis is not well understood, its reproduction and early life-history is particularly sparse and no descriptions of A. fragilis larvae exist in the literature. Growth lines have been used to estimate the age of adult bivalves. However, concurrent molecular and morphological analyses indicate that early-stage larvae were present in the water column during late summer and early autumn. This suggests that A. fragilis follows the same pattern of spawning in the summer and winter season that is found in other pinnids at temperate latitudes. The pelagic larval stage is believed to be four months in length before settling in the benthic region as adult bivalves. DNA barcoding has been used to identify the largely undocumented larvae of Atrina fragilis. This technique will allow scientists to identify fan mussel habitats and oceanic larval distribution so that in the future proper conservation efforts may be implemented in those areas.

== Threats ==
Atrina fragilis is sensitive to the effects of benthic fishing gears and its distribution is believed to have been impacted heavily by the industrialization of fishing over the past half century. The fan mussel is a benthic species which is torn from its habitat by trawling nets and industrial fishing gear. The displacement of a mussel from its habitat is detrimental to the animal and scientists are studying the species to help in conservation efforts.

== Conservation ==
Currently, there are two marine protected areas (MPAs) in the OSPAR network that include A. fragilis as a feature identified for protection; the South-West Deeps (England) and the Small Isles (Scotland) MPAs. Conservation efforts of the fan mussel are hindered due to the very limited knowledge scientists have of the life cycle and breeding season. The fan mussel is a protected species in the United Kingdom, under the Wildlife and Countryside Act 1981 – since 1998 has been a crime to kill, injure, possess or sell fan mussels. The United Kingdom Biodiversity Action Plan designates it a Priority Species for conservation.
