= Ctenidium (mollusc) =

Mollusk anatomic feature

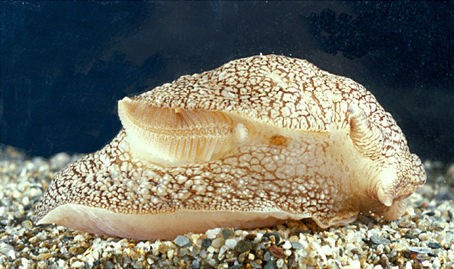
A live individual of Pleurobranchaea meckelii; the ctenidium is visible as a feather-like structure in this view of the right-hand side of the animal

A ctenidium is a respiratory organ or gill which is found in many molluscs. This structure exists in bivalves, cephalopods, polyplacophorans (chitons), and in aquatic gastropods such as freshwater snails and marine snails. Certain molluscs, such as the bivalves, possess paired ctenidia, but others, such as members of the Ampullariidae, bear a single ctenidium.

A ctenidium is shaped like a comb or a feather, with a central part from which many filaments or plate-like structures protrude, lined up in a row. Some aquatic gastropods possess a single row of filaments on their ctenidium, known as the monopectinate condition, and others have a pair of filament rows, known as the bipectinate or aspidobranch condition. The ctenidium hangs into the mantle cavity and increases the area available for gas exchange. The word is Latinized but is derived from the Greek ktenidion which means "little comb", being a diminutive of the word kteis meaning comb.

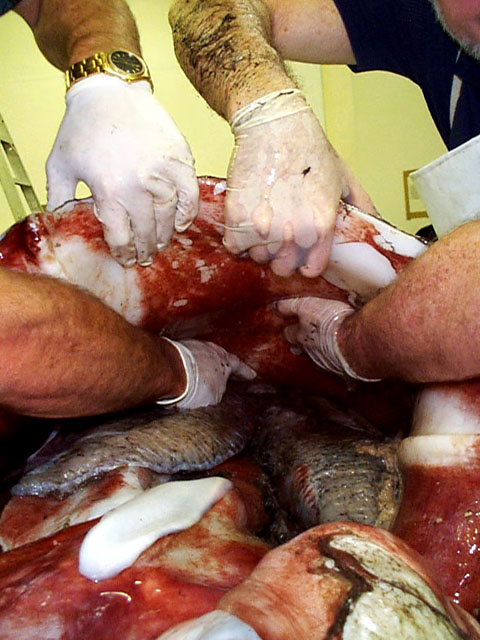
Pair of large, grey gills visible inside the mantle cavity of a giant squid
