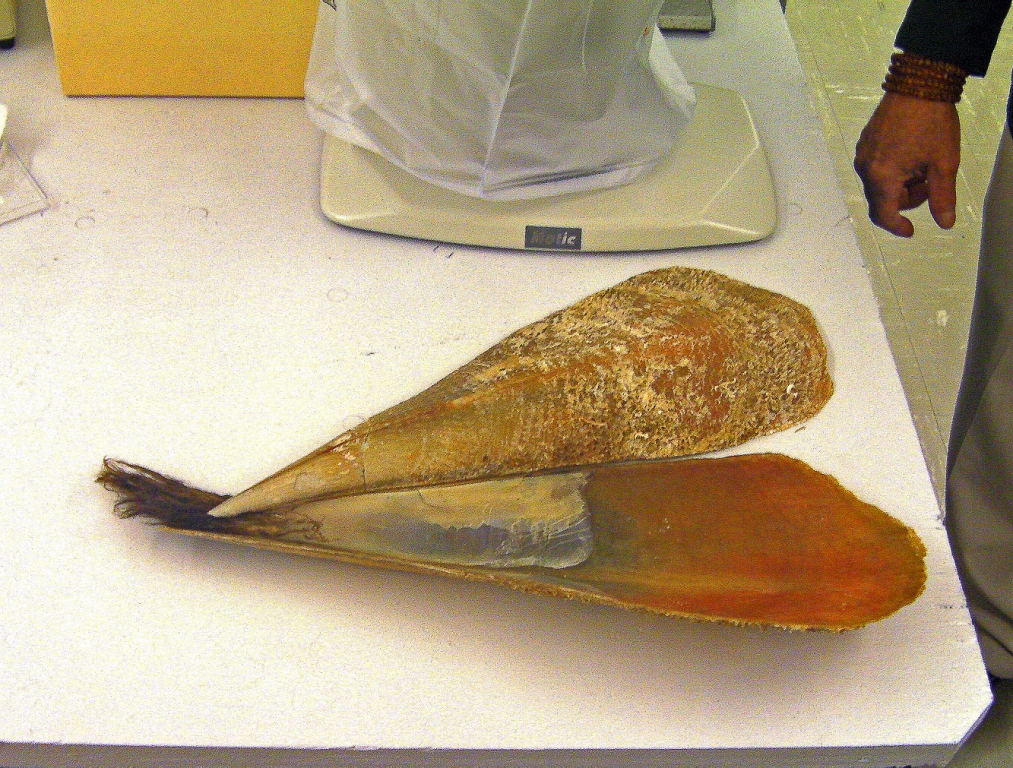
- Pinna nobilis shell and byssus

Scientific classification
- Kingdom: Animalia
- Phylum: Mollusca
- Class: Bivalvia
- Order: Pteriida
- Superfamily: Pinnoidea; Leach, 1819
- Family: Pinnidae; Leach, 1819

Genera
- See text

= Pinnidae =

Family of bivalves

The Pinnidae are a taxonomic family of large saltwater clams sometimes known as pen shells. They are marine bivalve molluscs in the order Pteriida.

== Shell description ==
The shells of bivalves in this family are fragile and have a long and triangular shape, and in life the pointed end is anchored in sediment using a byssus. The shells have a thin but highly iridescent inner layer of nacre in the part of the shell near the umbos (the pointed end).

The family Pinnidae includes the fan shell, Atrina fragilis, and Pinna nobilis, the source of sea silk. Some species are also fished for their food value.

== Human use ==
As Joseph Rosewater commented in 1961:

""The Pinnidae have considerable economic importance in many parts of the world. They produce pearls of moderate value. In the Mediterranean area, material made from the holdfast or byssus of Pinna nobilis Linné has been utilized in the manufacture of clothing for many centuries: gloves, shawls, stockings and cloaks. Apparel made from this material has an attractive golden hue and these items were greatly valued by the ancients. Today, Pinnidae are eaten in Japan, Polynesia, in several other Indo-Pacific island groups, and on the west coast of Mexico. In Polynesia, the valves of Atrina vexillum are carved to form decorative articles, and entire valves of larger specimens are sometimes used as plates."

Pen shells are highly prized as a food source and considered a delicacy in many countries, particularly throughout the Indo-Pacific and Asia, where they support both wild fisheries and aquaculture operations. The edible portion includes the adductor muscle and other tissues, with studies on Pinna bicolor showing the tissue wet weight comprises approximately 27.5% of the whole wet weight.

Additionally, research on Atrina maura has documented the species as an edible, commercially valuable host, though attention to parasitic nematodes is important for food safety considerations.

== Genera ==
Genera within the family Pinnidae:

- Atrina Gray, 1842 (40 species)
- Pinna Linnaeus, 1758 (27 species)
- Streptopinna von Martens, 1850 (monotypic)

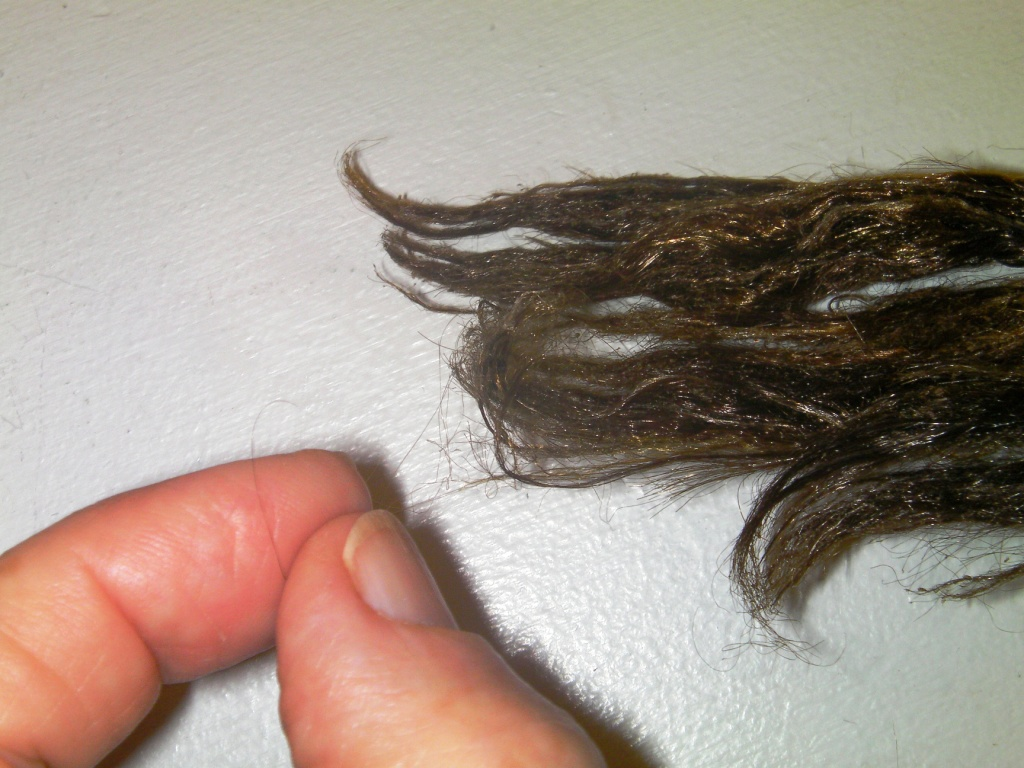
Photo showing extreme fineness of the byssus thread from Pinna nobilis
