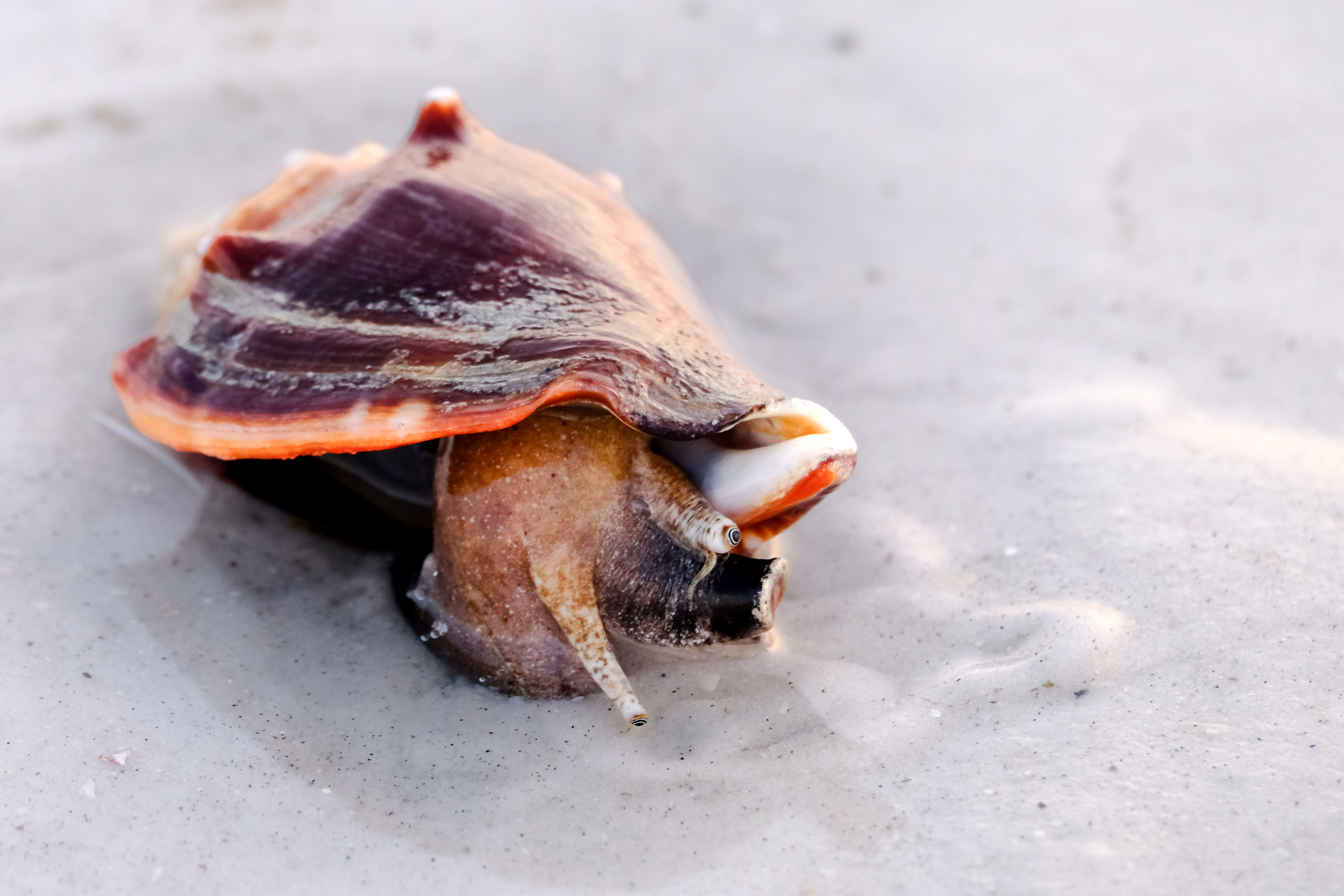
- A Florida fighting conch on a Florida beach
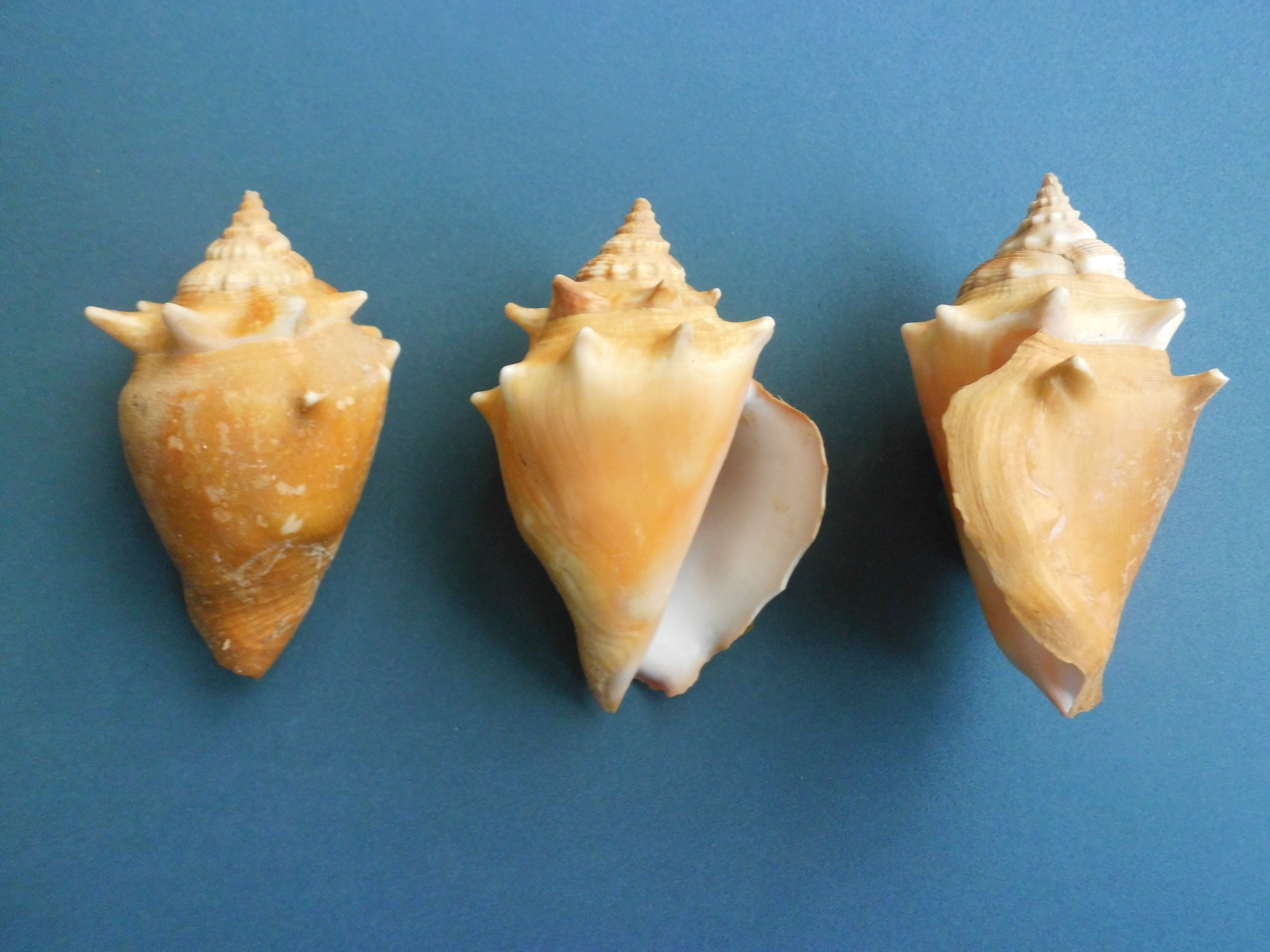

Scientific classification
- Kingdom: Animalia
- Phylum: Mollusca
- Class: Gastropoda
- Subclass: Caenogastropoda
- Order: Littorinimorpha
- Family: Strombidae
- Genus: Strombus
- Species: S. alatus

Binomial name
- Strombus alatus (Gmelin, 1791)

Synonyms
- Strombus crenulatus Röding, 1798; Strombus pyrulatus Lamarck, 1822; Strombus sulcatus Anton, 1838; Strombus dubius Sowerby II, 1842; Strombus undulatus Küster, 1845

= Strombus alatus =

Species of gastropod

Strombus alatus, the Florida fighting conch, is a species of medium-sized, warm-water sea snail, a marine gastropod mollusk in the family Strombidae, the true conches. Its name derives two Latin words. Strombus means, in Latin, a snail with spiral shell, which derives from the Greek στρόμβος, meaning anything turned or spun around, like a top or, as in Aristotle's Historia Animalium, a sea snail. Alatus means, in Latin, "winged".

== Distribution ==
This conch occurs in the Western Atlantic Ocean from North Carolina to Florida and the Gulf of Mexico, Louisiana, Texas, and the east coast of Mexico.

== Description ==
The shell can be as large as 112 mm (4.4 in).

This species is closely similar to Strombus pugilis, the West Indian fighting conch, which has a more southerly range. S. alatus shells have less prominent subsutural spines and slightly more projected outer lips. Some scientists have treated the two as distinct species; others as subspecies. In an extensive study of the Stromboidea in 2005, Simone provisionally treated these as distinct species, but observed, "no spectacular morphological difference was found [and] all related differences, even those of the genital system, can be regarded as extreme of variation of a single, wide distributed, variable species."

== Phylogeny ==
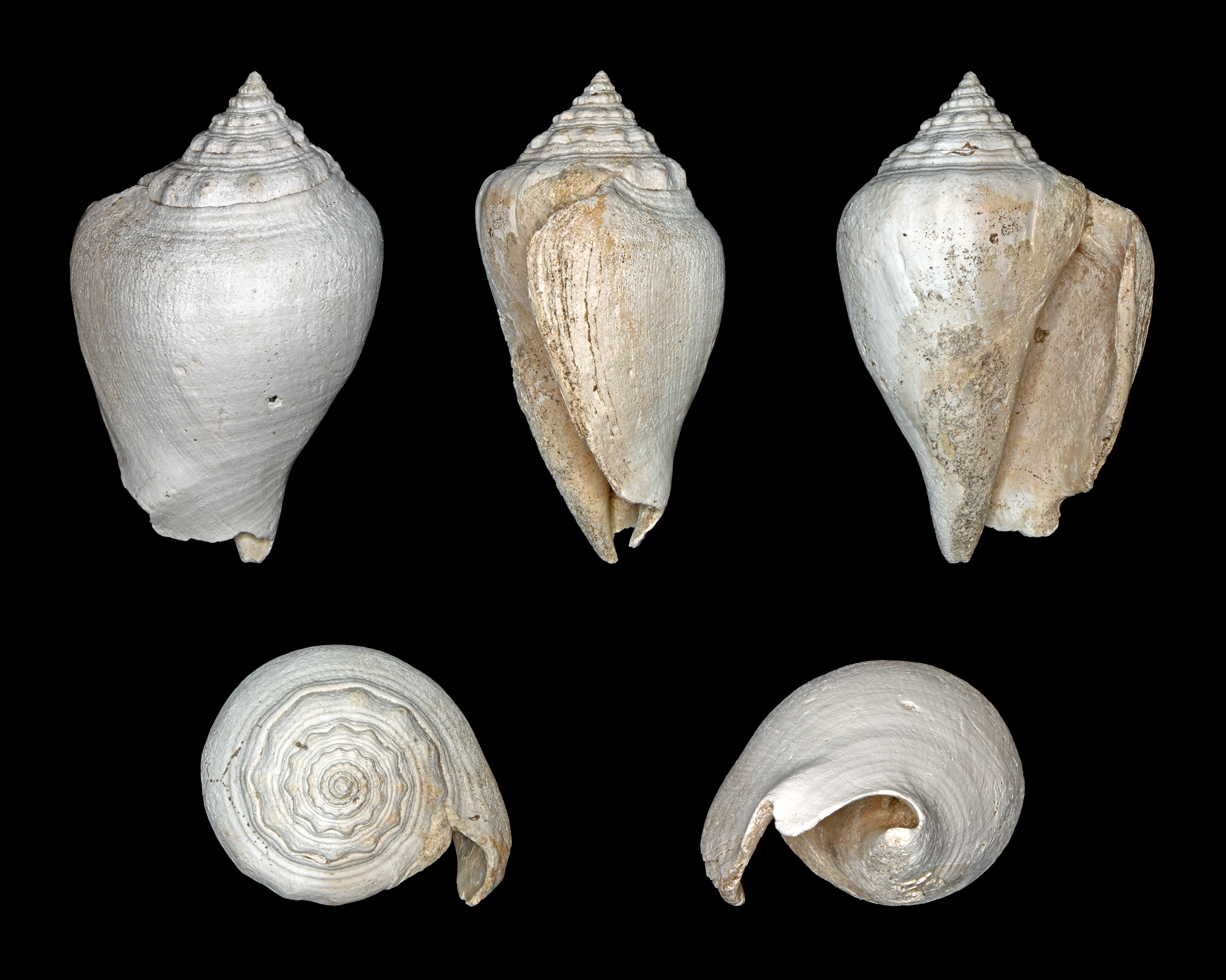
Fossil Strombus alatus from Caloosahatchee Formation, Sarasota, Florida, USA

A cladogram based on sequences of nuclear histone H3 gene and mitochondrial cytochrome-c oxidase I (COI) gene showing phylogenetic relationships of (32 analyzed) species in the genus Strombus and Lambis, including S. alatus, was proposed by Latiolais et al. (2006):

- - - - - - - - - - Strombus gallus
                  - Strombus gigas
                - Strombus costatus
              - - Strombus raninus
                - Strombus peruvianus
            - Strombus galeus
          - Strombus latus
        - - - - Strombus pugilis
              - Strombus alatus
            - Strombus gracilior
          - Strombus granulatus

Phylogeny and relationships of Eastern Pacific and Atlantic Strombus species, according to Latiolais et al. (2006)

== Habitat ==
The minimum recorded depth for this species is the surface; the maximum recorded depth is 183 m.
