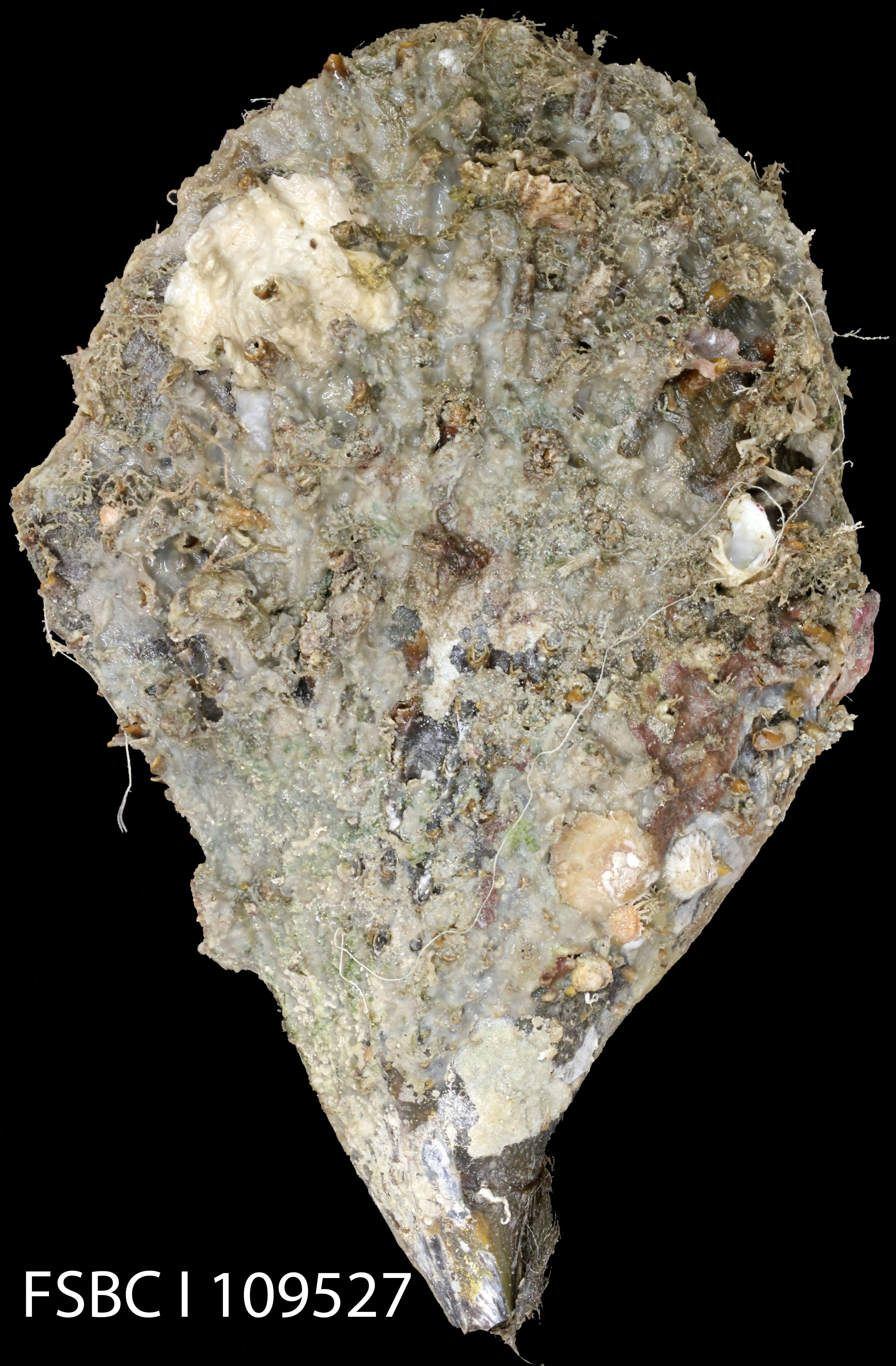

Conservation status
- Secure (NatureServe)

Scientific classification
- Kingdom: Animalia
- Phylum: Mollusca
- Class: Bivalvia
- Order: Pteriida
- Family: Pinnidae
- Genus: Atrina
- Species: A. rigida

Binomial name
- Atrina rigida (Lightfoot, 1786)

Synonyms
- Pinna rigida Lightfoot, 1786

= Atrina rigida =

Species of bivalve

Atrina rigida, commonly called the rigid pen shell, is a species of bivalve mollusk in the family Pinnidae.

== Description ==
The rigid shell has a pair of thick spiny valves held together by ligaments that run along the entire dorsal side of the bivalve. The shell can reach up to 12 in (30 cm) long and 6.5 in (17 cm) wide. The bivalve is triangular with 15 to 25 low ribs radiating from the pointed anterior end (or umbo) to the large posterior edge. The exterior of the shell is usually a dull brownish color with many small tube-like spines along the crest of its radiating ribs. Its anterior end is typically buried in fine substrate and attached by byssal threads, with its wider posterior gaping end extending just above the sea bottom surface to facilitate filter-feeding. Algae (e.g. Lobophora variegata) and invertebrates such as sponges and encrusting corals tend to grow on the exposed part of the shell and may camouflage it very well.

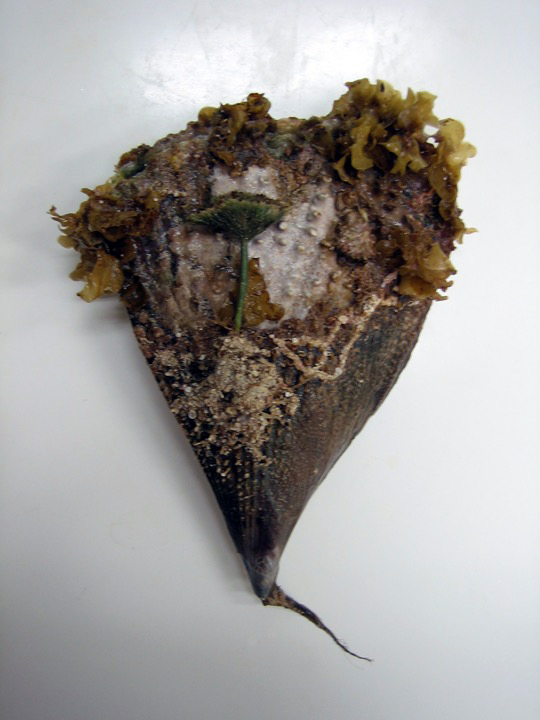
Atrina rigida from Barahona, Dominican Republic

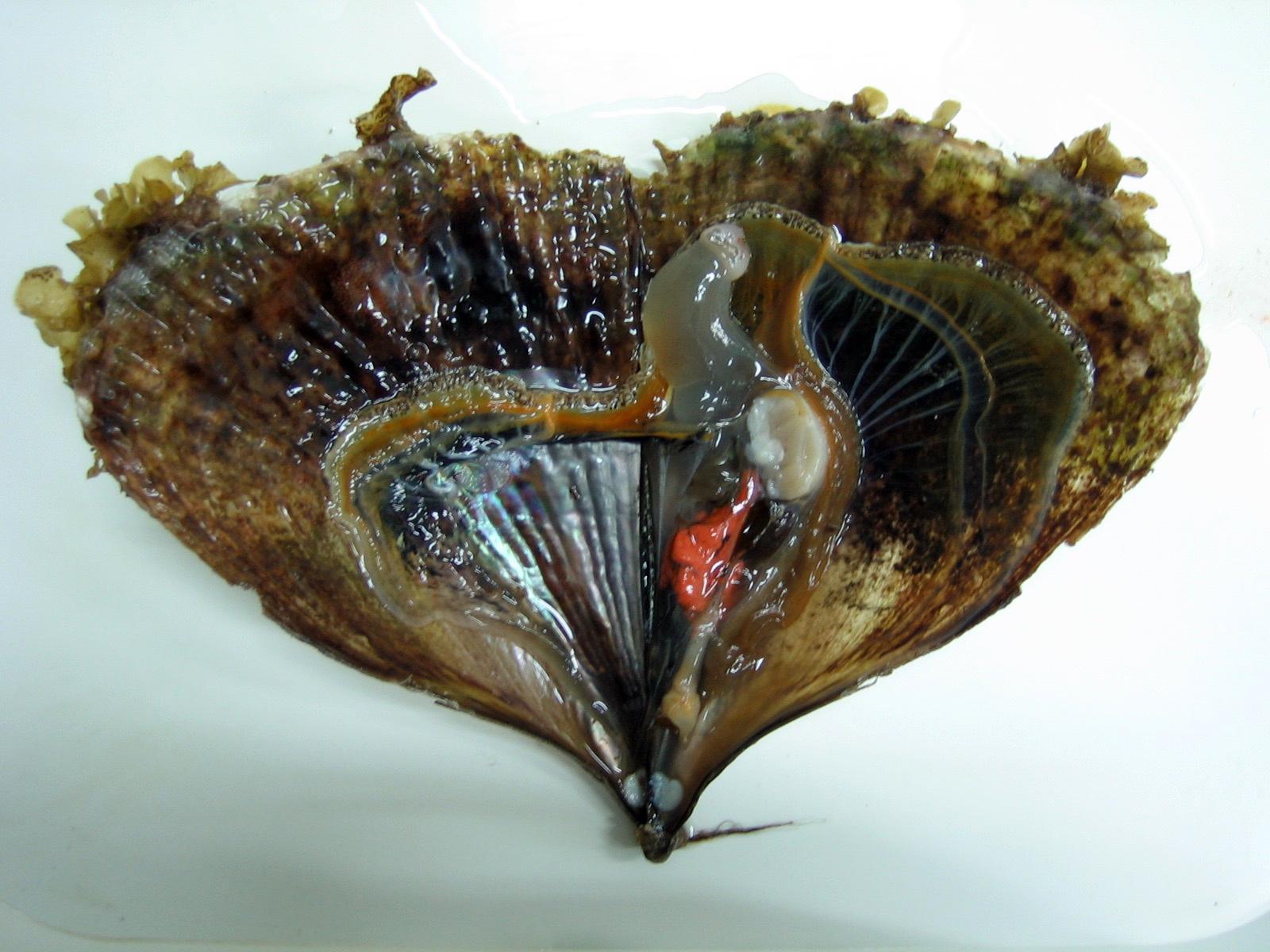
Opened penshell bivalve showing viscera

== Distribution and habitat ==
The rigid pen shell can be found in coastal western Atlantic waters, ranging from southern Florida across the Caribbean and the West Indies to Brazil and the southern part of India. It is a benthic shallow water species and is typically found in soft-bottom silty habitats.

== Filter-feeding ==
The rigid pen shell burrows as it grows, but the wide posterior end of the shell always remains exposed so water from above the seafloor can be drawn through the inhalent chamber of the mantle cavity. Typical of bivalves, water is drawn over gills or ctenidium by the beating of cilia where oxygen from the water is absorbed. Suspended food and other water-borne nutrients also become trapped in mucus, which is then transported to the mouth, digested and expelled as feces. Unique gutter-like waste canals in the viscera of the inhalent chamber also help to keep gills and other organs clear from silt and other unwanted water-borne particules by expelling these as pseudofeces.

== Symbionts ==
Commensal symbionts such as crustaceans and a cardinal fish, Astrapogon stellatus, may be found sheltering inside the shell's mantle cavity. This species is preyed upon by starfish, and other carnivorous gastropods, including the horse conch, Triplofusus papillosus.
