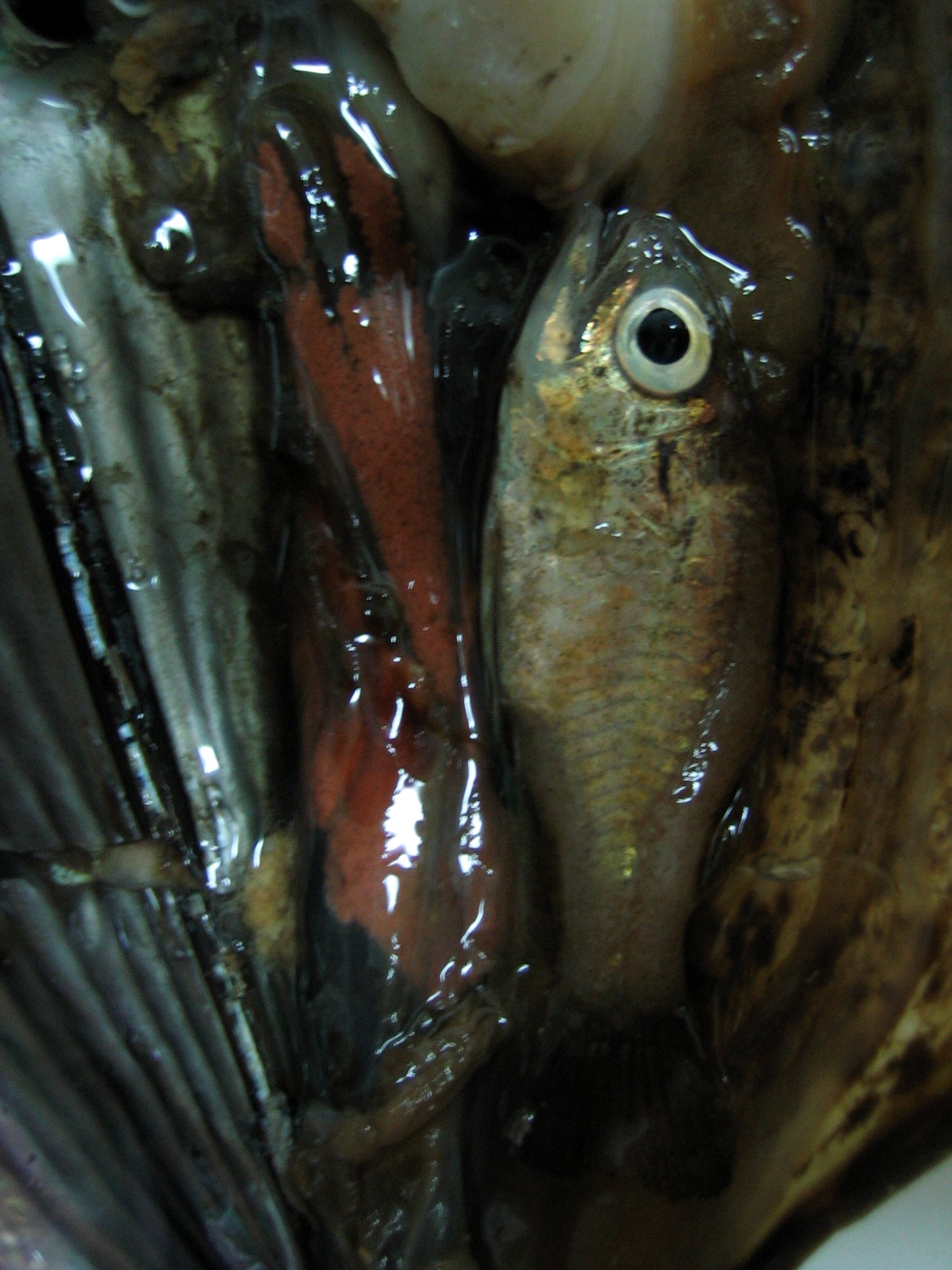
- Astrapogon stellatus inside a penshell from Jaragua National Park, Dominican Republic

Conservation status
- Data Deficient (IUCN 3.1)

Scientific classification
- Kingdom: Animalia
- Phylum: Chordata
- Class: Actinopterygii
- Order: Gobiiformes
- Family: Apogonidae
- Genus: Astrapogon
- Species: A. stellatus

Binomial name
- Astrapogon stellatus (Cope, 1867)

Synonyms
- Apogonichthys stellatus Cope, 1867

= Astrapogon stellatus =

Species of fish

Astrapogon stellatus is a species of ray-finned fish in the family Apogonidae, the cardinal fishes. It lives in the tropical western Atlantic Ocean, the Caribbean Sea and the Gulf of Mexico. It is commonly known as the conchfish because it typically conceals itself in the mantle cavity of a living queen conch (Aliger gigas) by day.

== Description ==
Cardinal fishes have large eyes, a large mouth, two widely separated dorsal fins, a long caudal peduncle and large scales. A. stellatus grows to a maximum standard length of 8 cm (3 in). It is dark brown or black, but also has a pale phase, and can be distinguished from related species by its pigmentation and meristics.

== Distribution and habitat ==
A. stellatus is native to the tropical western Atlantic Ocean, the Caribbean Sea and the Gulf of Mexico. Its range extends from Florida, Bermuda and the Bahamas to the Greater and Lesser Antilles, and Brazil, as far south as Rio de Janeiro. It typically inhabits reefs and clear shallow waters to a depth of about 40 m (130 ft).

== Ecology ==
A. stellatus is a cryptic, nocturnal species, and feeds on plankton in the open sea. Usually a solitary fish, a pair bond is formed at breeding time. The male is a mouth-brooder, retaining the eggs in his mouth until they hatch, but otherwise, very little is known about the fish's biology.

A. stellatus has a commensal relationship with the queen conch (Aliger gigas), living by day within the mollusc's mantle cavity, and emerging at night to forage. The queen conch is becoming increasingly rare because of over-fishing, and the conchfish has been reported using the rigid pen shell (Atrina rigida) as an alternative refuge. Also amber pen shell (Pinna carnea) is sometimes used. Other members of the family take refuge in corals, sponges and rock crevices.
