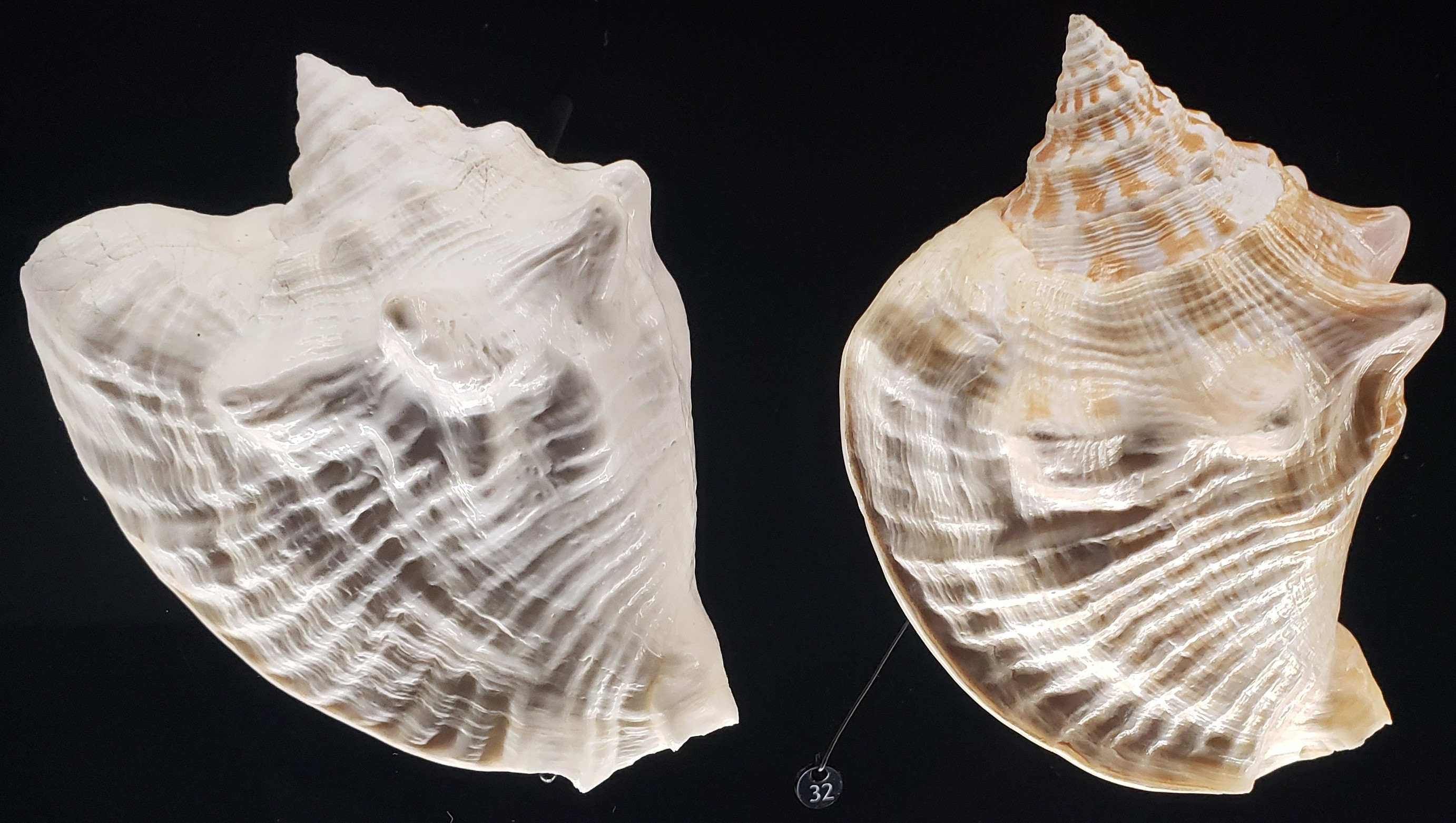
- Shells of Macrostrombus costatus

Scientific classification
- Kingdom: Animalia
- Phylum: Mollusca
- Class: Gastropoda
- Subclass: Caenogastropoda
- Order: Littorinimorpha
- Family: Strombidae
- Genus: Macrostrombus
- Species: M. costatus

Binomial name
- Macrostrombus costatus (Gmelin, 1791)

Synonyms
- Aliger costatus (Gmelin, 1791); Lambis accipitrina Röding, 1798; Lobatus costatus (Gmelin, 1791); Strombus accipiter Dillwyn, 1817; Strombus costatus Gmelin, 1791 (basionym); Strombus costatus aguayoi Jaume & del Valle, 1947; Strombus costatus griffini Petuch, 1994 †; Strombus costatus spectabilis Verrill, 1950; Strombus inermis Swainson, 1822; Strombus integer Swainson, 1823; Strombus jeffersonia Van Hyning, 1945

= Macrostrombus costatus =

Species of sea snail

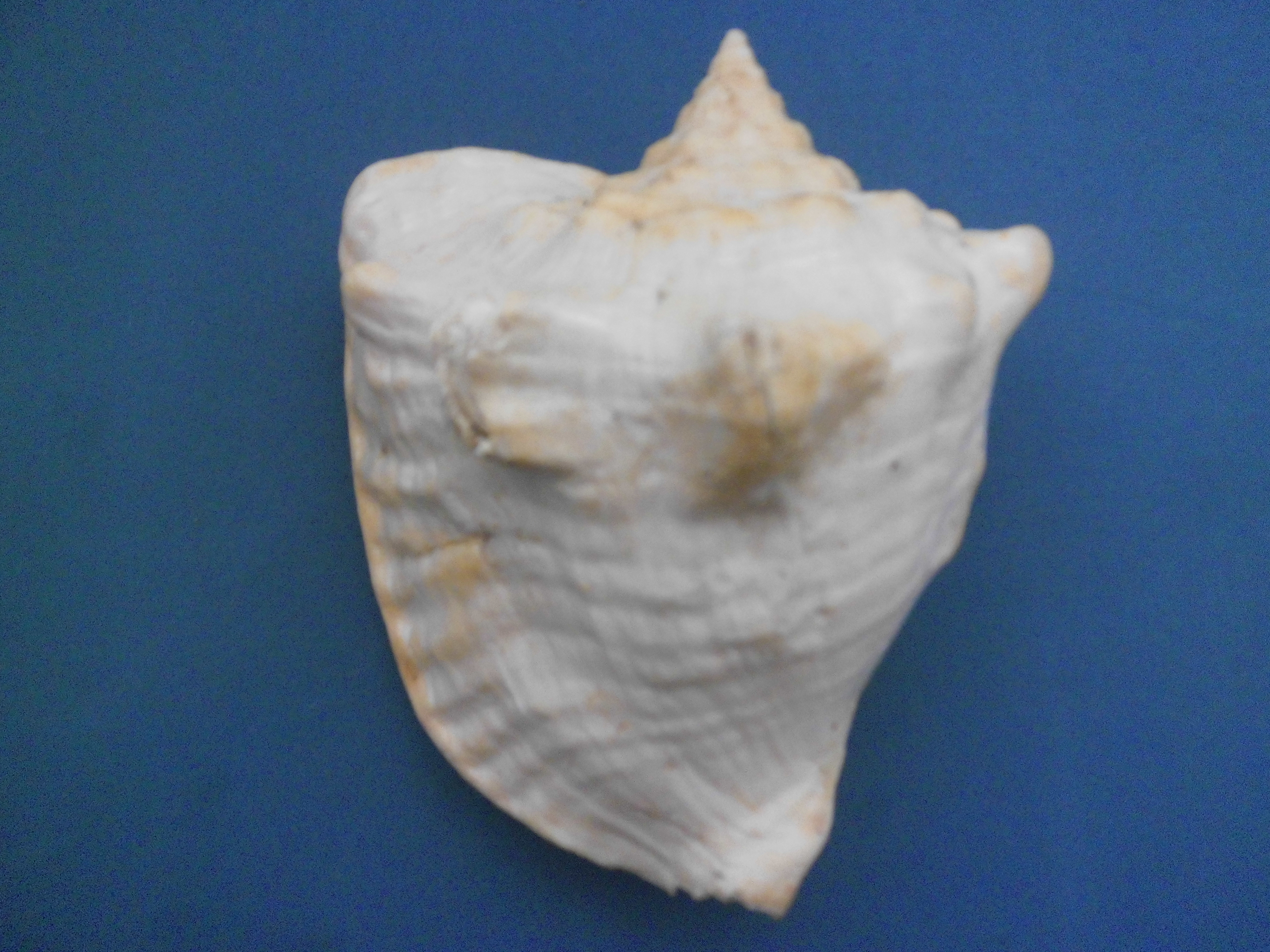
Macrostormbus costatus dorsal view of adult shell.

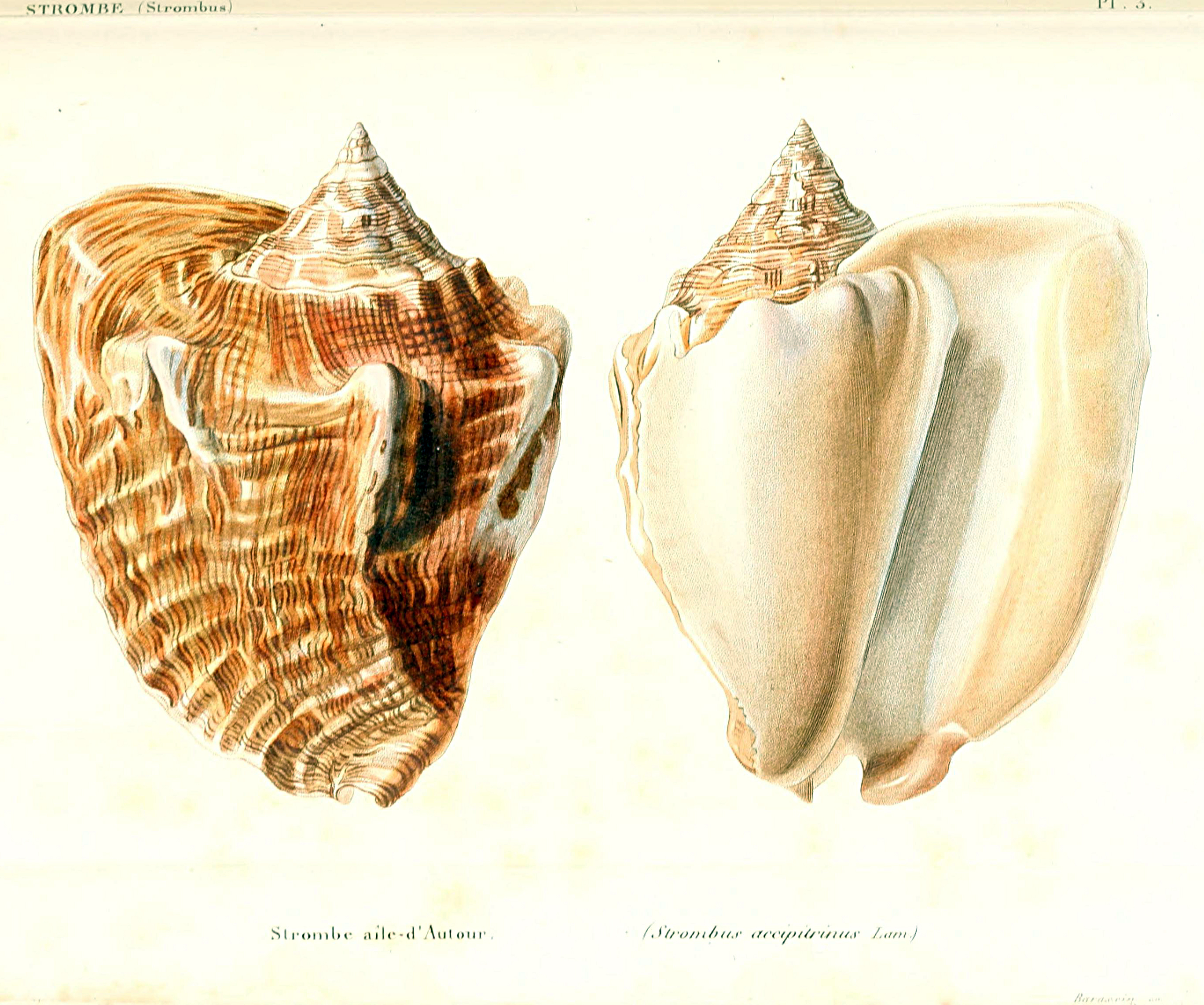
Colored drawing of a Aliger costatus from Kiener, 1843

Macrostrombus costatus, formerly known as Strombus costatus and Lobatus costatus, or commonly known as the milk conch, is a species of large sea snail, a marine gastropod mollusk in the family Strombidae, the true conchs. They are an edible species and important food source for the inhabitants of where they are found. Conchs are most notable for their medium to large-sized ornamental shells. Milk conchs are dispersed among the tropical waters of the Atlantic Ocean, along the coasts and islands of North, Central, and South America.

== Distribution ==
This species occurs in the Caribbean Sea; the Gulf of Mexico and the Lesser Antilles; in the Atlantic Ocean from North Carolina to East Brazil. Specifically in Central and South America, Macrostormbus costatus have been recorded along the coasts of Paraíba state of northeastern Brazil, Venezuela, Panama, Bermuda, Yucatan Peninsula in Mexico, and Trinidad and Tobago.

== Anatomy and morphology ==
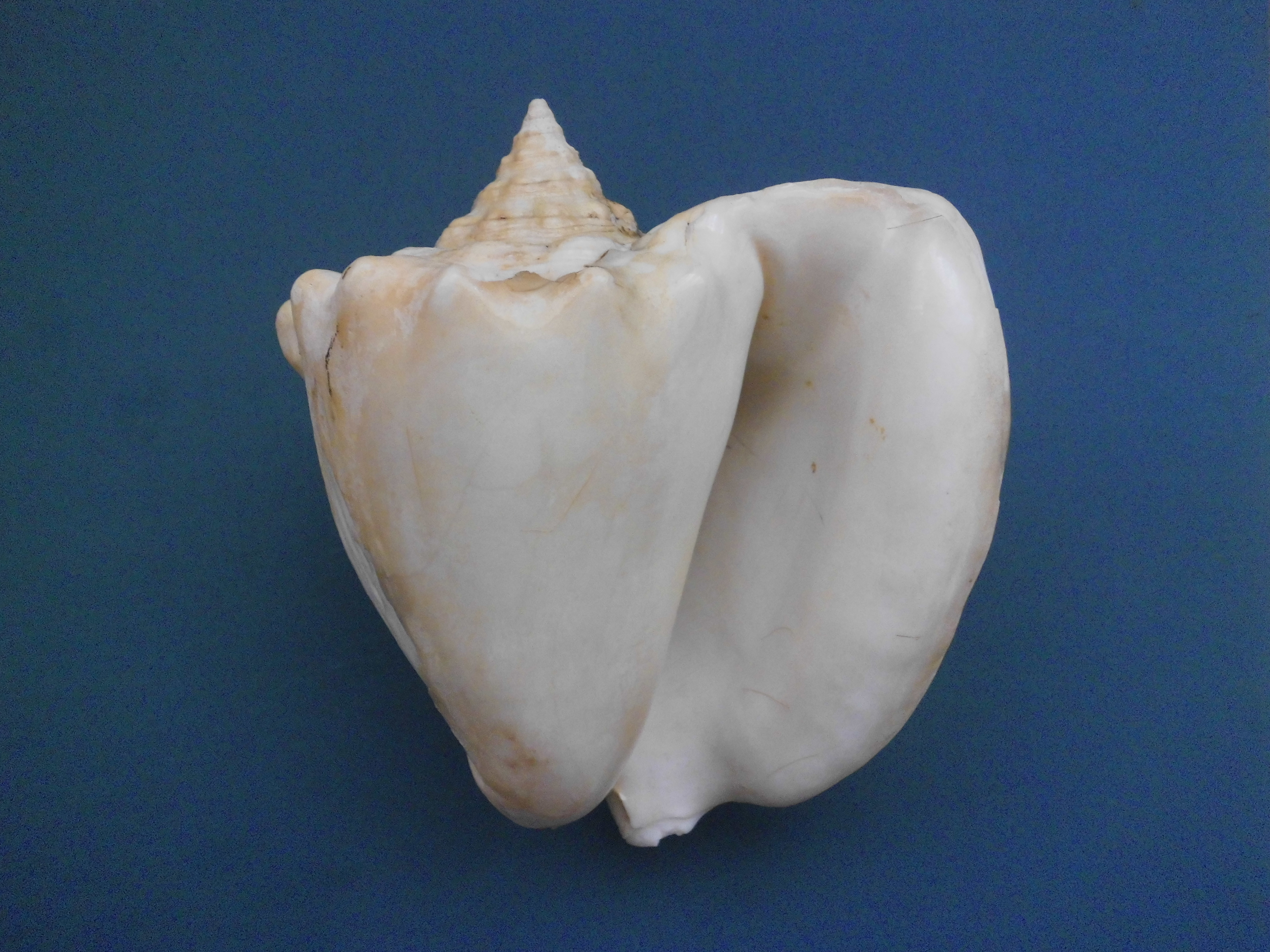
Macrostrombus costatus ventral view of adult shell.

Macrostrombus costatus is a large species of sea snail with a thick shell. The shell of an adult milk conch can be distinguished by the high spire and flaring lip. The common name milk conch is derived from the milky, white interior coloration of the aperture and light cream exterior of its shell. In contrast, other conch species, such as Aliger gigas or Strombus pugilis, are known to have various shades of pink and red tones in the aperture and various patterns or colors on the external surface. Milk conch eyes have rings that can range in colors from red, orange, yellow, to black. An average M. costatus shell measures around 20 cm in length. The maximum recorded shell length is 23.1 cm. However, they are a smaller conch species compared to the more widely studied Aliger gigas, the queen conch, which can measure up to 31 cm.

== Habitat ==
Macrostrombus costatus prefers shallow-water back reef habitats, such as algal banks, seagrass beds, and patch reefs, which provide them with shelter, protection, and food. The habitat environment of a milk conch changes with its geographical location. In Paraiba, they have been seen at one meter under surface water, in areas of sand between patch reefs. Whereas in Puerto Rico, they are mostly found in algal mats. In Panama, there is an overwhelming abundance of milk conch in seagrass meadows, where turtle and manatee grass dominates the flora. Milk conch can inhabit depths varying between three meters to twenty meters. Minimum recorded depth is 2 m. Maximum recorded depth is 55 m.

== Reproduction ==
Macrostrombus costatus has external sex organs. Male milk conchs have a verge, while female milk conchs have an egg groove. Milk conchs are oviparous. These marine gastropods begin to spawn in early November throughout the winter and spring seasons. Spawning comes to an end in May. They have been found to aggregate in groups to spawn in locations of open sand and deeper waters.

== Life cycle ==
Macrostrombus costatus begins its life developing inside eggs as planktonic larvae. The larvae, known as veligers, feed on different cultures of phytoplankton for nutrition to support growth. Then, as a pelagic veliger, the milk conch reaches metamorphosis to a benthic snail in approximately 26–30 days after hatching. The development of the proboscis (contains part of the oral cavity and radula), the loss of velar lobes, and the eyes migrating outwards occur provide morphological evidence of metamorphosis. Juvenile milk conchs have a distinguished conical shaped shell with tight whorls and green-colored proboscis. At this stage, they begin grazing on algae via their proboscis. Crustaceans, such as crabs and lobsters are their main predators when they are juvenile.

== Feeding ==
Macrostrombus costatus is a herbivorous marine gastropod. As veligers, they consume phytoplankton. As adult snails, they feed mostly on algae.

== Threats ==
Macrostrombus costatus is fished for its meat and ornamental shell along the tropical Atlantic regions. The species has commercial importance, especially in the Caribbean, but the total catch volume has not been estimated. It is believed that Macrostrombus costatus is overfished. Therefore, there may be a major decline in the species populations. In Panama, there are no current regulations on the harvesting of milk conch. The conservation status of the species is unknown, due to lack of research.
