= Calyptraeotheres garthi =

Scientific classification
- Kingdom: Animalia
- Phylum: Arthropoda
- Clade: Pancrustacea
- Class: Malacostraca
- Order: Decapoda
- Suborder: Pleocyemata
- Infraorder: Brachyura
- Family: Pinnotheridae
- Genus: Calyptraeotheres
- Species: C. garthi

Binomial name
- Calyptraeotheres garthi (Fenucci, 1975)

Synonyms
- Pinnotheres garthi Fenucci, 1975

Species of crustacean

Calyptraeotheres garthi is a species of pea crab in the family Pinnotheridae. It is found in the southwestern Atlantic Ocean and is a parasitic castrator of the slipper limpet Crepidula cachimilla.

== Taxonomy ==
When Jorge L. Fenucci originally encountered C. garthi, he first mistook it for the related C. politus (then placed in Pinnotheres). A few years later, he described the species under Pinnotheres as P. garthi (not "Fabia garthi", as cited in WoRMS).

When Ernesto Campos described his new genus Calyptraeotheres for a species then still placed in Fabia, he noted that both P. politus (i.e. C. politus) and P. garthi were also likely to belong to his new genus. He effected the transfer of these species in 1999.

== Description ==
The female Calyptraeotheres garthi exhibits certain adaptations that are probably associated with its parasitic way of life. The invasive stage has a compact body shape, a hard carapace and large setae (bristles) on its swimming legs. At its next moult it loses these traits and becomes soft bodied with a rounded carapace and slender legs and claws. After several more moults it regains its hard carapace and more robust legs and claws. The male does not go through any soft-bodied stages.

== Distribution ==
Calyptraeotheres garthi is native to the waters off the coast of Argentina, where its host slipper limpet lives at depths of between 10 and 20 m (33 and 66 ft).

== Ecology ==
Calyptraeotheres garthi is a parasitic castrator: it inhabits the brood chamber of the slipper limpet Crepidula cachimilla. Its host is a filter feeder, filtering phytoplankton from the water with the help of a string of mucus round the edges of its gills, and it is this green, plankton-laden mucus that the pea crab eats. The presence of the pea crab reduces the amount of food available to the slipper limpet. While the crab is present, the slipper limpet does not breed, and is effectively castrated. On removal of the pea crab, breeding in the slipper limpet resumes. It is unclear whether the cessation of breeding in the presence of the crab is due to a reduction in nutrients available to the slipper limpet, or to some other mechanism such as "steric interference" where castration occurs because the parasite physically prevents host reproduction in some way.

The life cycle of this crab has been studied, and involves five zoeal larval stages and one postlarval stage, all of which are free-living. The infective stage is probably the first instar juvenile.
