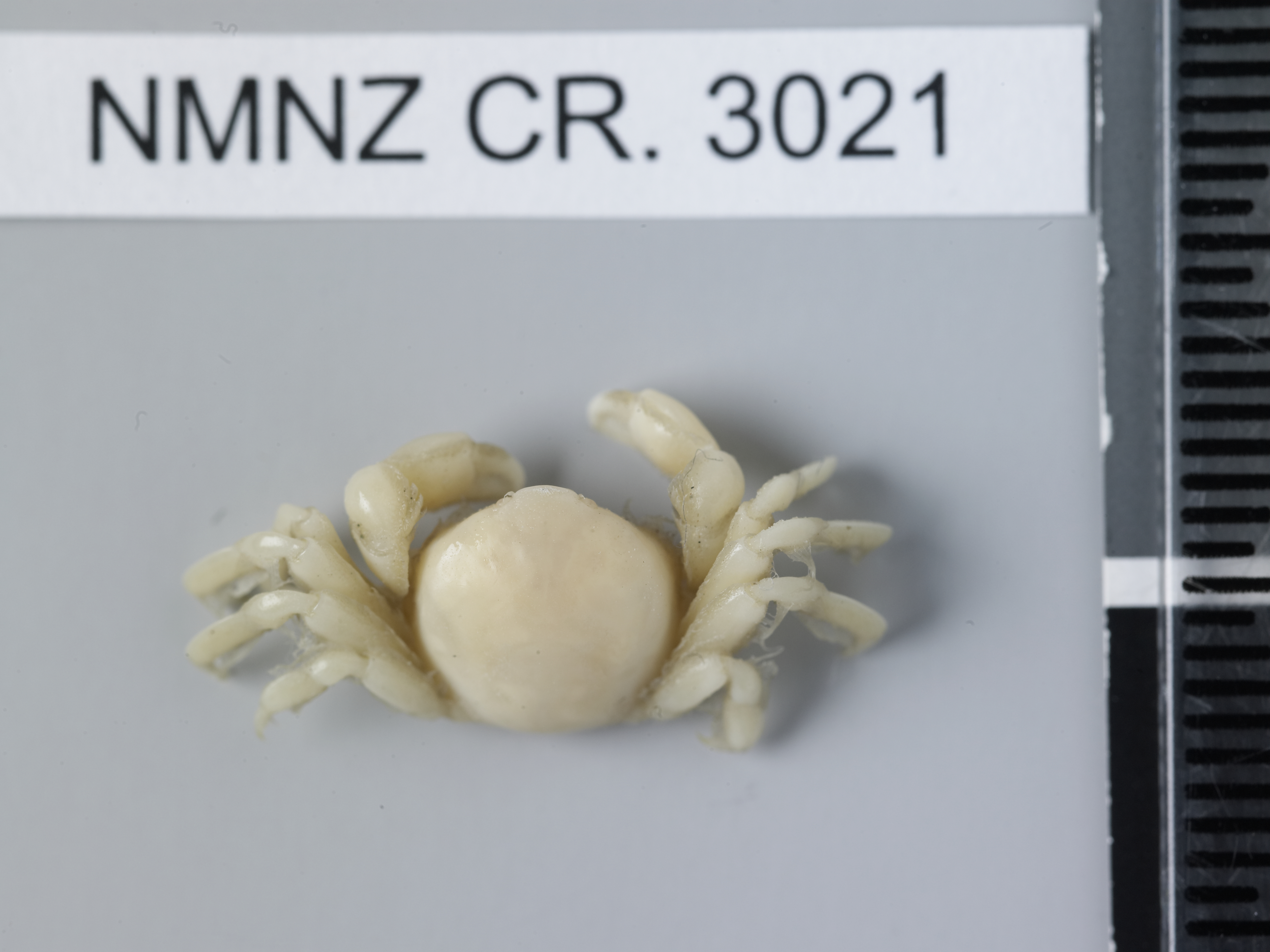

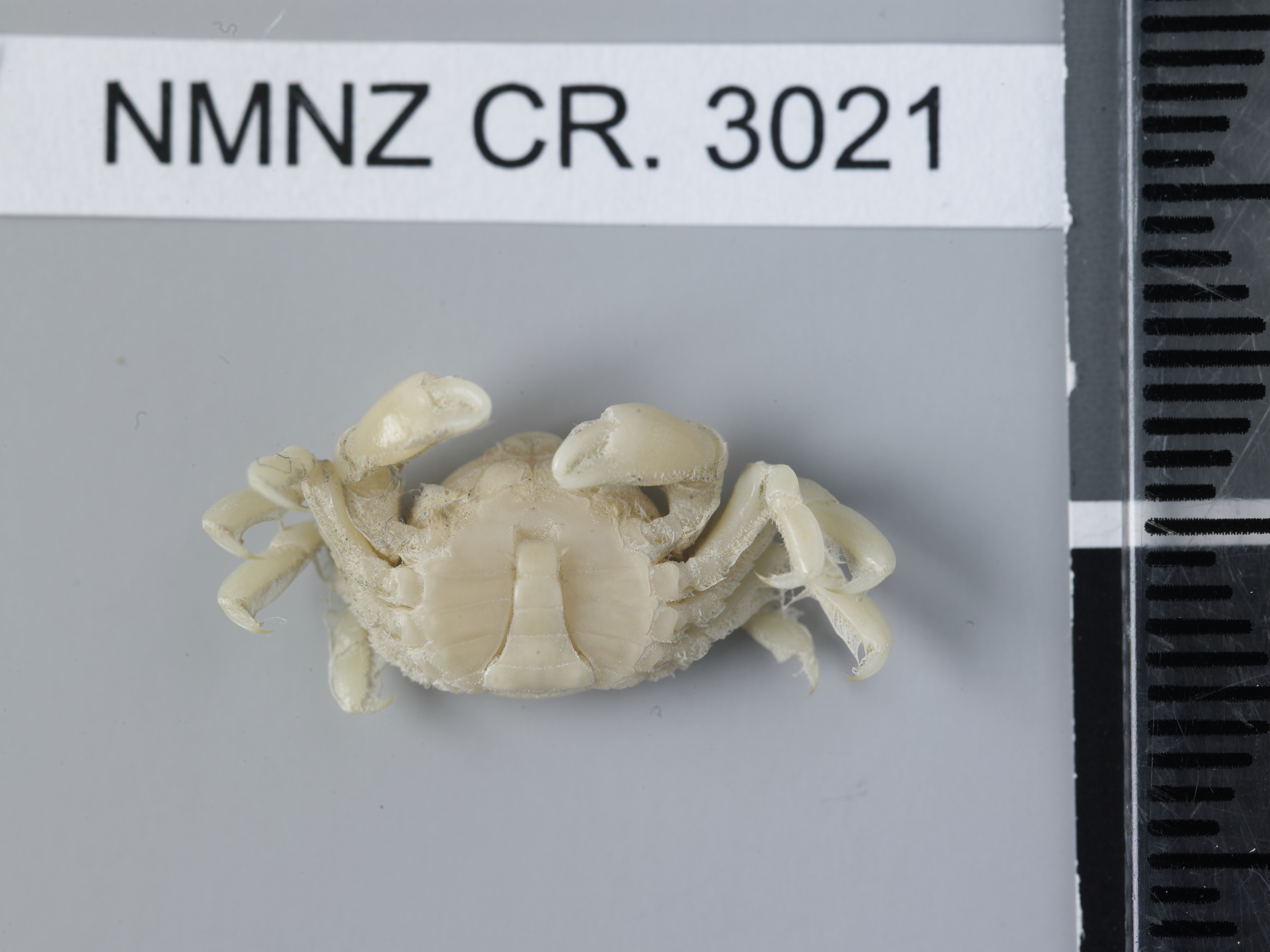

Scientific classification
- Kingdom: Animalia
- Phylum: Arthropoda
- Class: Malacostraca
- Order: Decapoda
- Suborder: Pleocyemata
- Infraorder: Brachyura
- Family: Pinnotheridae
- Genus: Pinnotheres
- Species: P. atrinicola

Binomial name
- Pinnotheres atrinicola Page, 1983

= Pinnotheres atrinicola =

Species of crab

Pinnotheres atrinicola is a small crab that lives symbiotically in the horse mussel Atrina zelandica around New Zealand. This species was recognised as being distinct from Pinnotheres novaezelandiae in 1983.
