= Dissodactylus mellitae =

Scientific classification
- Kingdom: Animalia
- Phylum: Arthropoda
- Class: Malacostraca
- Order: Decapoda
- Suborder: Pleocyemata
- Infraorder: Brachyura
- Family: Pinnotheridae
- Genus: Dissodactylus
- Species: D. mellitae

Binomial name
- Dissodactylus mellitae (M. J. Rathbun, 1900)

Species of crab

Dissodactylus mellitae, the sand-dollar pea crab, is a species of pea crab in the family Pinnotheridae. It is found in the western Atlantic Ocean.
