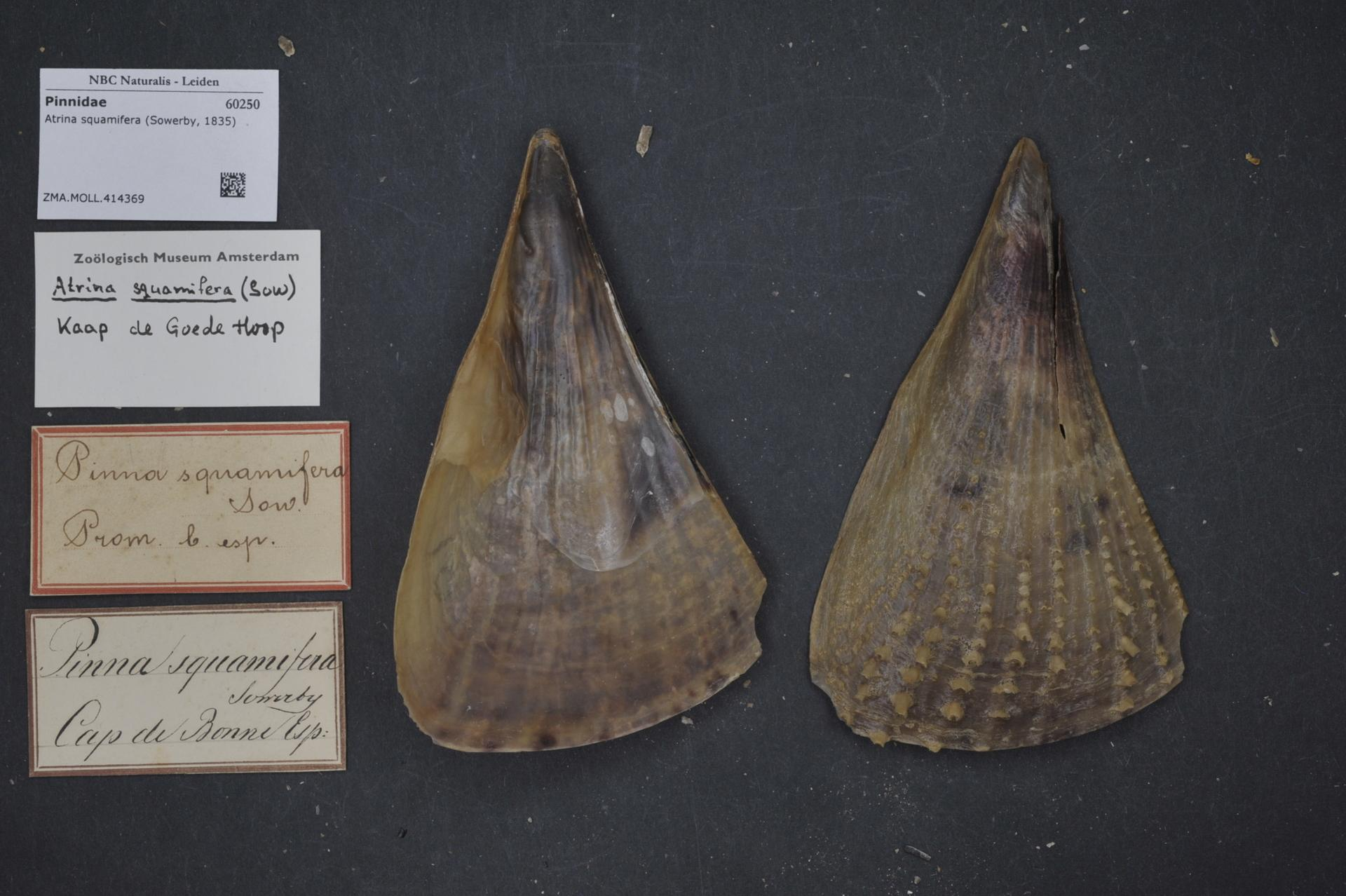

Scientific classification
- Kingdom: Animalia
- Phylum: Mollusca
- Class: Bivalvia
- Order: Pteriida
- Family: Pinnidae
- Genus: Atrina
- Species: A. squamifera

Binomial name
- Atrina squamifera (Sowerby I, 1835)

Synonyms
- Pinna squamifera G. B. Sowerby I, 1835

= Atrina squamifera =

Species of bivalve

Atrina squamifera, one of several species known as the horse mussel, is a species of bivalve pen shell. It is a marine mollusc in the family Pinnidae. It is endemic to South Africa.

== Distribution ==
This species is found from Saldanha Bay to Port Alfred, subtidally to at least 35 m.

== Description ==
This animal has a large fragile shell and can grow up to 390 mm in total length. It has 6–12 ribs running longitudinally down its shell. Each rib bears translucent cup-like projections. The shell does not close at the posterior end and the dark-rimmed white flesh can be seen inside.

== Ecology ==
The horse mussel is a filter feeder. It usually lies buried vertically in mud or sand although it can also be seen on the wooden decks of the trawler wrecks Orotava and Princess Elizabeth in Smitswinkel Bay. The shell is often heavily overgrown with other invertebrates. The mantle cavity often contains small pea crabs and shrimp which eat food filtered from the gills.
