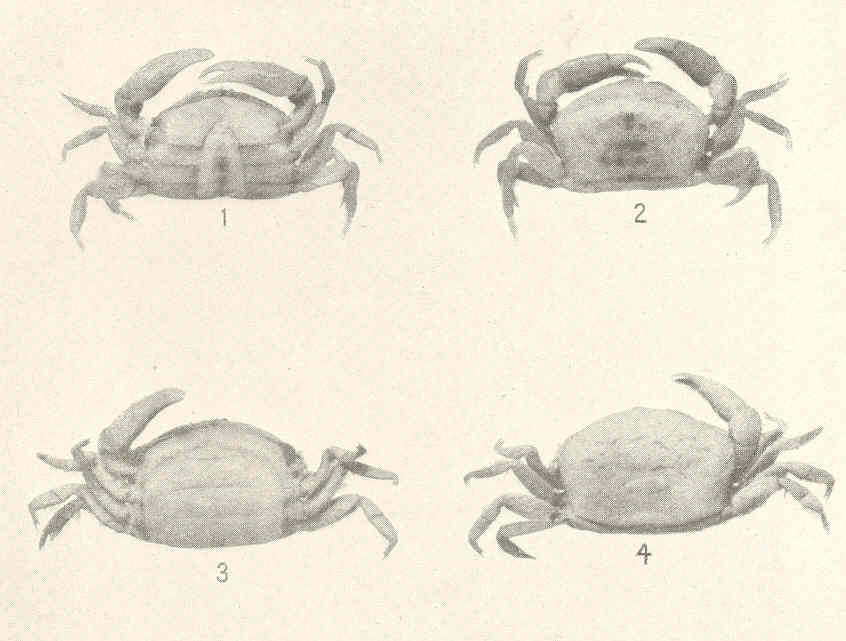

Scientific classification
- Kingdom: Animalia
- Phylum: Arthropoda
- Class: Malacostraca
- Order: Decapoda
- Suborder: Pleocyemata
- Infraorder: Brachyura
- Family: Pinnotheridae
- Genus: Dissodactylus; Smith, 1870

= Dissodactylus =

Genus of crabs

Dissodactylus is a genus of pea crabs in the family Pinnotheridae. There are at least 20 described species in Dissodactylus.

== Species ==
The following 20 species belong to the genus Dissodactylus:

- Dissodactylus borradailei M. J. Rathbun, 1918
- Dissodactylus crinitichelis Moreira, 1901
- Dissodactylus glasselli Rioja, 1944
- Dissodactylus juvenalis Bouvier
- Dissodactylus latus Griffith, 1987
- Dissodactylus lockingtoni Glassell, 1935
- Dissodactylus mellitae (M. J. Rathbun, 1900) (sand-dollar pea crab)
- Dissodactylus meyerabichi Bott, 1955
- Dissodactylus nitidus Smith, 1870
- Dissodactylus pelagicus (Aikawa, 1933)
- Dissodactylus pinna (Aikawa, 1933)
- Dissodactylus primitivus Bouvier, 1917
- Dissodactylus schmitti H.Griffith, 1987
- Dissodactylus singularis (Aikawa, 1933)
- Dissodactylus speciosus (Aikawa, 1933)
- Dissodactylus tokyoensis (Aikawa, 1933)
- Dissodactylus unicornis (Aikawa, 1933)
- Dissodactylus usufructus Griffith
- Dissodactylus xantusi Glassell, 1936
