= Calyptraeotheres =

Scientific classification
- Kingdom: Animalia
- Phylum: Arthropoda
- Class: Malacostraca
- Order: Decapoda
- Suborder: Pleocyemata
- Infraorder: Brachyura
- Family: Pinnotheridae
- Genus: Calyptraeotheres; E. Campos, 1990

Genus of crabs

Calyptraeotheres is a genus of pea crabs in the family Pinnotheridae.

== Species ==
The World Register of Marine Species lists the following species:-

- Calyptraeotheres camposi Ayón-Parente & Hendrickx, 2014
- Calyptraeotheres garthi (Fenucci, 1975)
- Calyptraeotheres granti (Glassell, 1933)
- Calyptraeotheres hernandezi Hernández-Ávila & Campos, 2006
- Calyptraeotheres pepeluisi E. Campos & Hernández-Ávila, 2010
- Calyptraeotheres politus (Smith, 1870)
