= Viridotheres indicus =

Scientific classification
- Kingdom: Animalia
- Phylum: Arthropoda
- Clade: Pancrustacea
- Class: Malacostraca
- Order: Decapoda
- Suborder: Pleocyemata
- Infraorder: Brachyura
- Family: Pinnotheridae
- Genus: Viridotheres
- Species: V. indicus

Binomial name
- Viridotheres indicus Mitra & Ng, 2025

Species of crab

Viridotheres indicus is a species of crab in the family Pinnotheridae. The species was described by Mitra and Ng based on specimen collected from West Bengal, India.

== Range ==
It is only known from its type locality New Digha beach, East Midnapore District, West Bengal, India.
