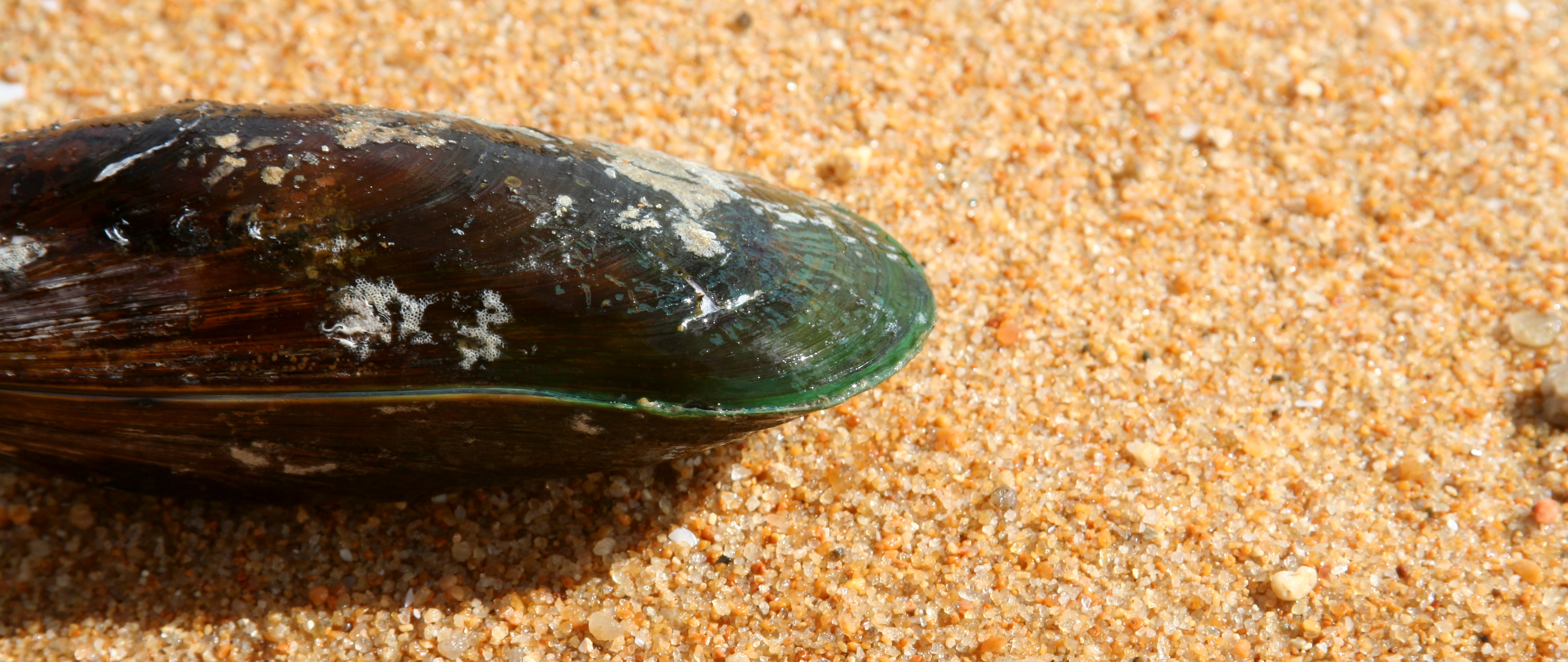
- Close-up of the green lip of this mussel species

Scientific classification
- Kingdom: Animalia
- Phylum: Mollusca
- Class: Bivalvia
- Order: Mytilida
- Family: Mytilidae
- Genus: Perna
- Species: P. canaliculus

Binomial name
- Perna canaliculus (Gmelin, 1791)

Synonyms
- Mytilus canaliculatus Gray, 1843; Mytilus canaliculus Gmelin, 1791 (original combination); Mytilus durus Lightfoot, 1786; Mytilus latus Dillwyn, 1817; Mytilus tasmanicus Tenison-Woods, 1876

= Perna canaliculus =

New Zealand green-lipped mussel

Species of bivalve

Perna canaliculus, (Note: The word "canaliculus" is a noun, not an adjective, so it is invariable and does not agree grammatically in gender with the genus that it is combined with.) the New Zealand green-lipped mussel, also known as the New Zealand mussel, the greenshell mussel, kuku, and kutai, is a bivalve mollusc in the family Mytilidae (the true mussels). P. canaliculus has economic importance as a cultivated species in New Zealand.

== Distribution ==
Perna canaliculus occurs around all of New Zealand's mainland. It is usually found below the intertidal zone, but it can occur in the intertidal zone. P. canaliculus feeds on various types of phytoplankton.

== Description ==
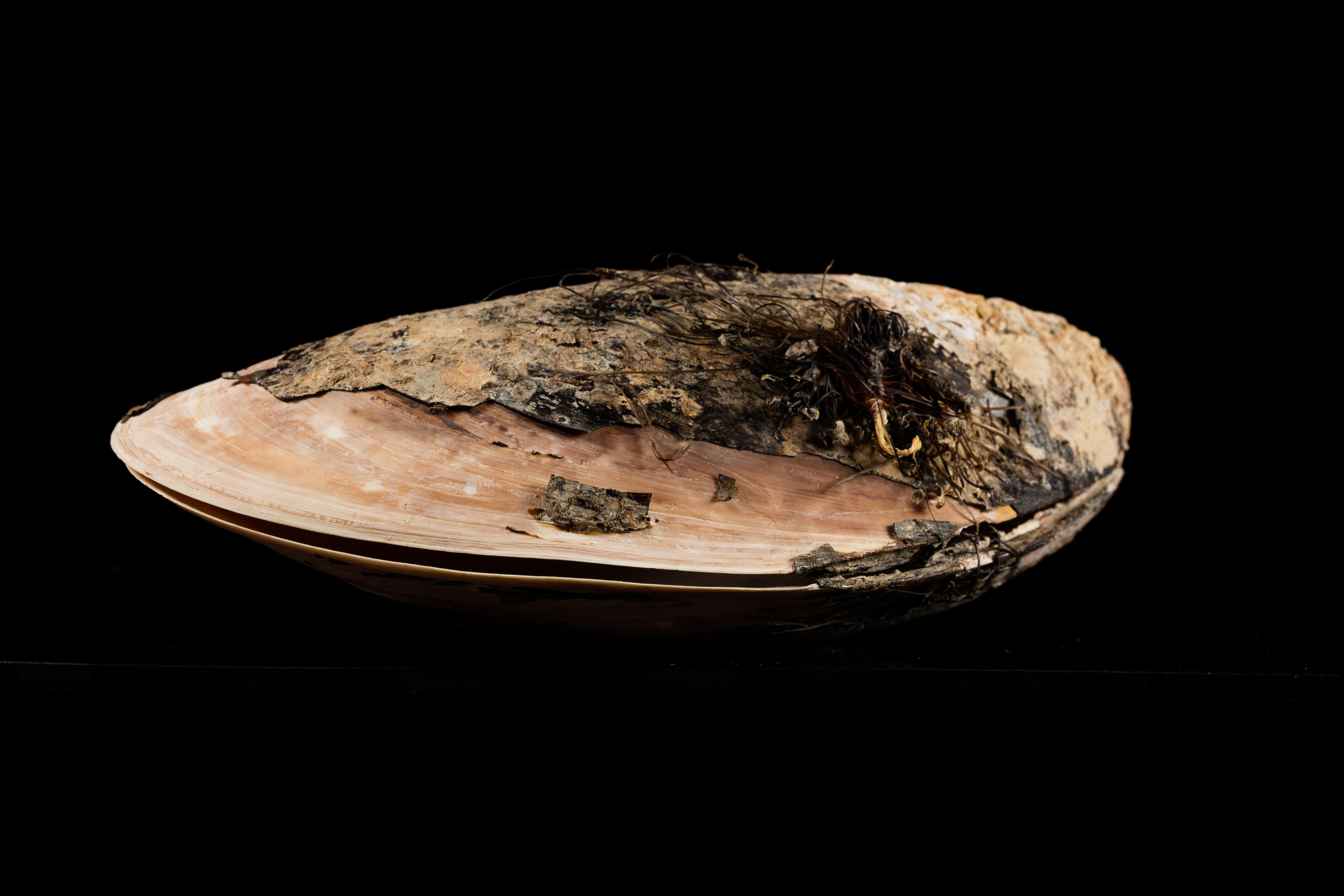
Specimen of P. canaliculus from the collections of Auckland War Memorial Museum

This shellfish is economically important to New Zealand. It differs from other mussel species in that it has dark brown/green shells with green lips around the edges, and has only one adductor muscle. It is also one of the largest mussel species, reaching 240 millimetres (9 in) in length.

== Aquaculture ==
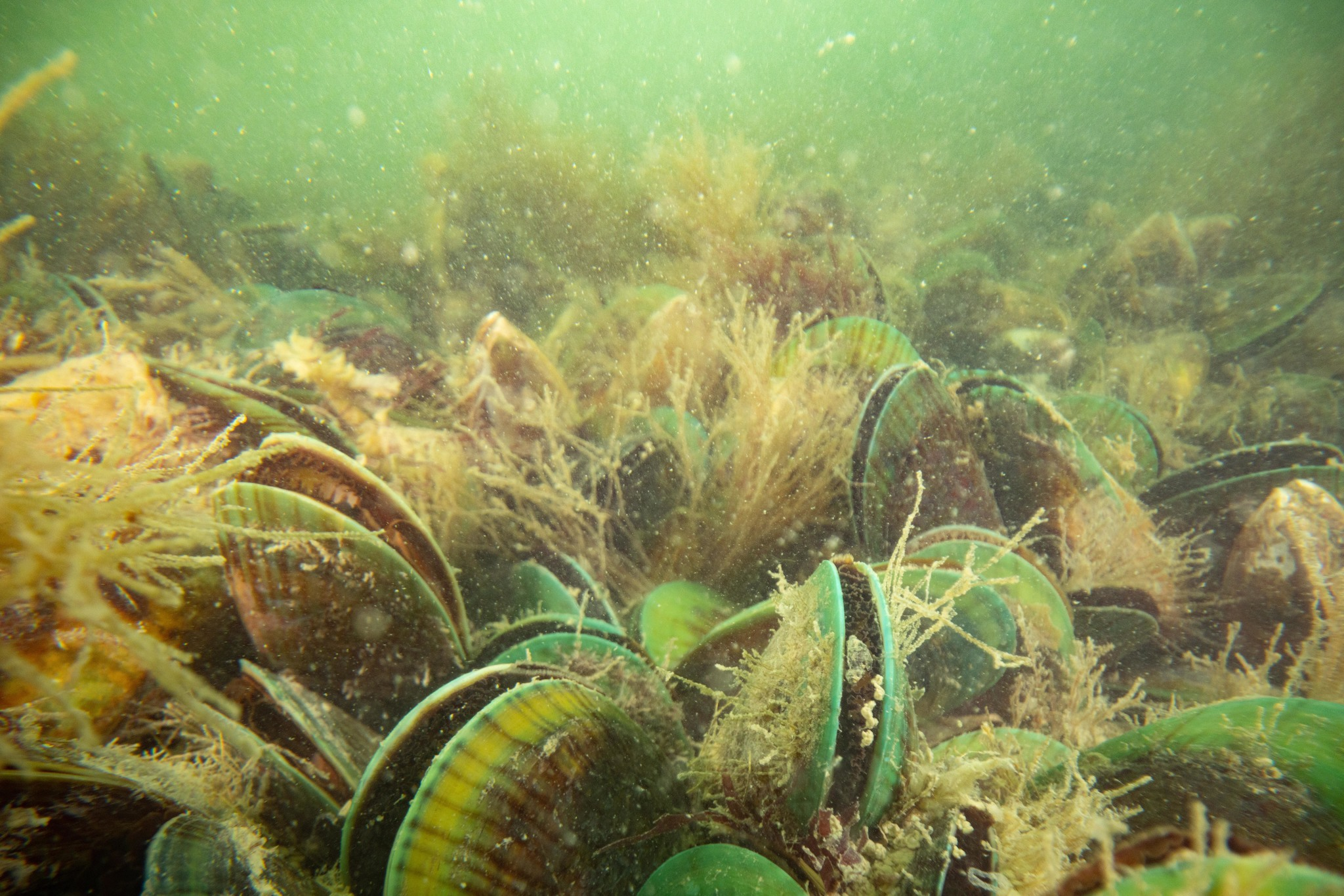
Restored mussel bed

Aquaculture production
reported by the FAO, 1980–2010

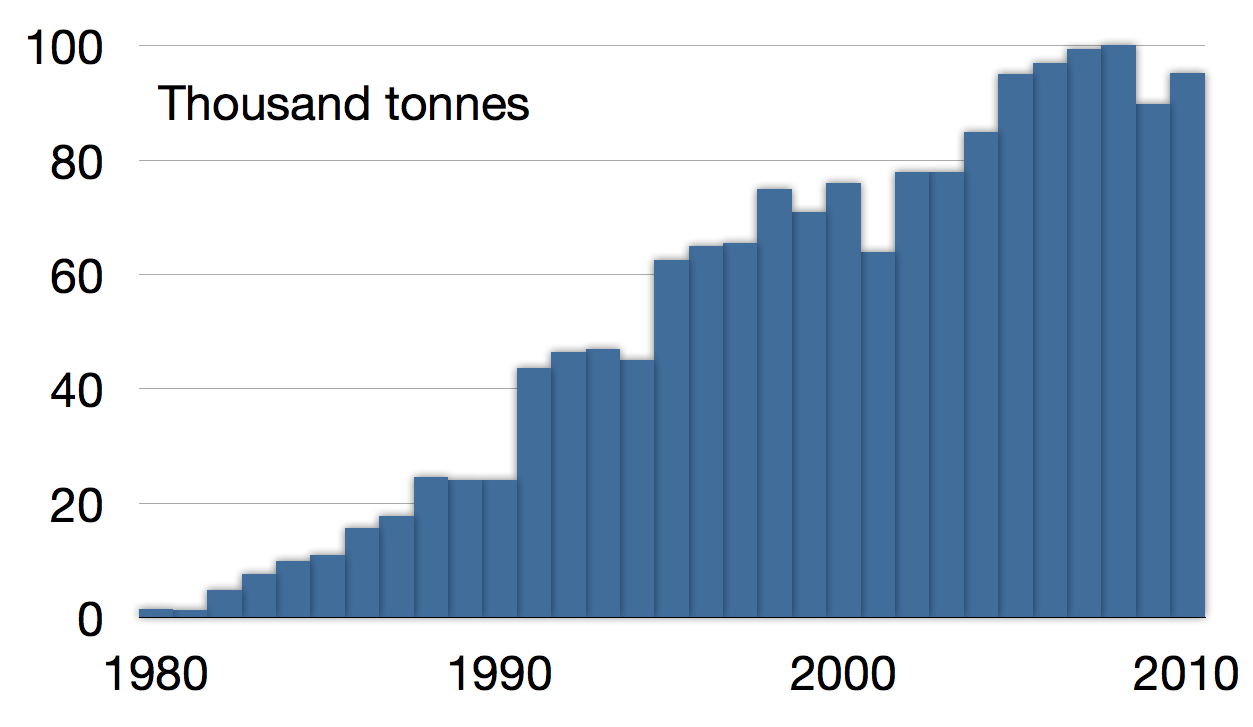
↑ Production

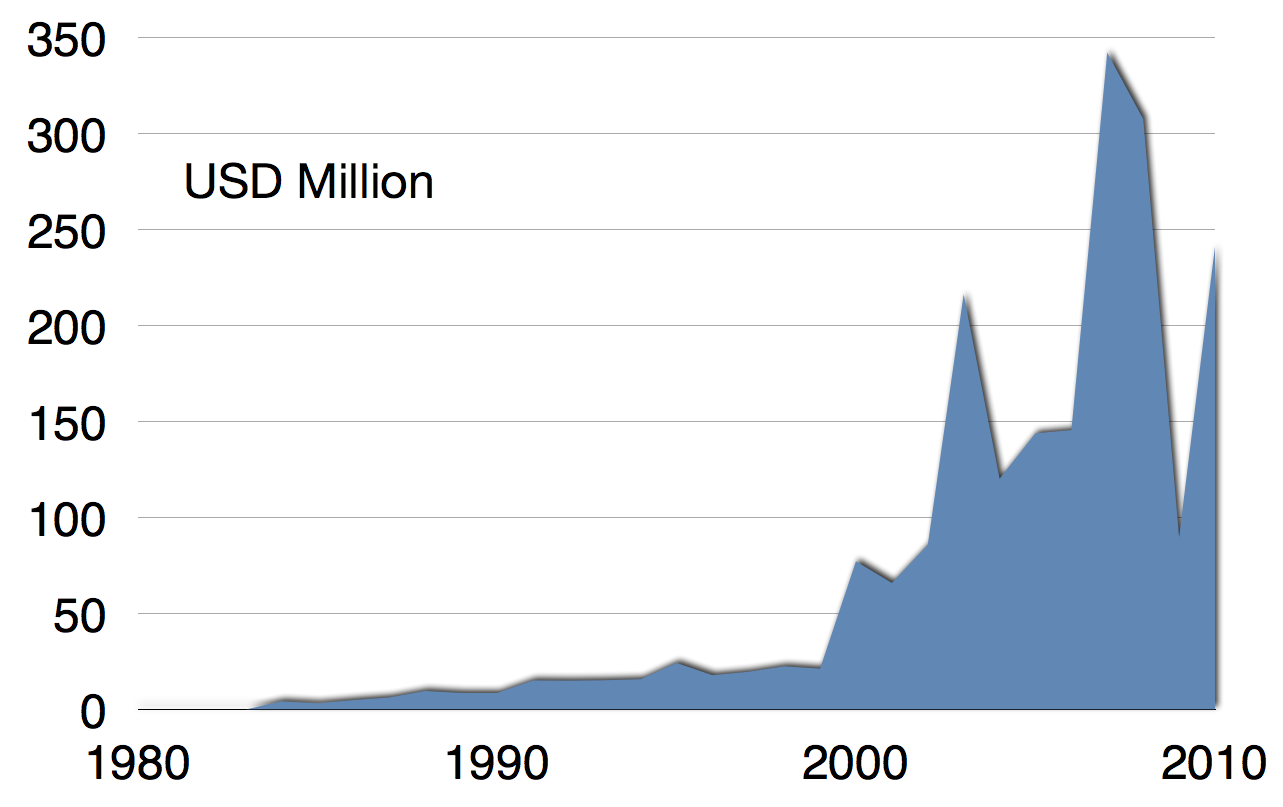
↑ Value

P. canaliculus is endemic to New Zealand. When grown for aquaculture there, it is marketed under the trademark name Greenshell. This industry produces over 140,000 metric tons (150,000 short tons) annually and in 2009 was valued in excess of NZ$250 million. The aquaculture of the New Zealand greenshell mussel relies heavily on the production of mussel seed, or spat, by wild mussel populations. Around 270 tonnes of wild spat which is attached to beach-cast seaweed are collected from Ninety Mile Beach in northern New Zealand each year to supply the aquaculture industry. Nowhere else in the country are such large quantities of mussel-covered seaweed washed ashore. The density of spat varies from 200 to 2,000,000 per kilogram (91 to 907,185 per pound) of seaweed. This single beach provides around 80% of the seed mussels required for this aquaculture industry. The remaining 20% is caught using fibrous ropes which are suspended in the sea near mussel farms. Even with this industry's heavy dependency on wild spat, the biological and environmental processes by which the spat arrives on Ninety Mile Beach and on spat collection ropes are largely unknown. Furthermore, the amount of mussel spat that lands on Ninety Mile Beach is highly variable. This uncertainty of supply has resulted in major production problems for the industry which must endure periods up to a year without the arrival of any spat. 'Spatfall' events are also affected by El Niño periods and can result in delays in mussel farm production due to the insufficient seed landing on Ninety Mile Beach.

New Zealand greenshell mussel cultivation began in the 1970s and has since undergone massive expansion, with production growth of 708% from 1988 to 2000 (an average annual growth of 18%). Initial farms were based on the 700-year-old European floating raft method of mussel cultivation which was suitable at small scales; however, methods to support larger scale production were soon needed. An adaption of the Japanese longline shellfish aquaculture system led to the methods used today for commercial greenshell aquaculture and facilitated the transition to large-scale production by incorporating mechanized harvesting. This adaptation of the Japanese longline method consists of a series of large plastic buoys connected by two ropes forming a backbone which is held in place by concrete anchor blocks or steel anchors screwed into the seabed. Once the spat have been transported from the beach to mussel farms around the country, they are transferred into a stocking that holds the spat-covered seaweed material around a "dropper rope" which is suspended in the water column hanging at regular intervals off the backbone ropes. Soon after, the stocking and seaweed rots away, leaving only the rope for the mussels to attach. Subsequent loss of spat from the dropper ropes is typically high, generally over 50% and as high as 95%. This loss is partly due to the secondary settlement behaviour of mussels, whereby the spat can release their point of attachment to the growing rope and exude a mucous "parachute" to help move to an alternative settlement site using water currents. This loss of spat from mussel farms is a significant problem for the industry. A 2007 study identified two stressors that reduce the retention of mussels on the rope; desiccation and starvation (both of which are experienced on the journey from where the spat are harvested to where they are farmed). Steps to reduce these stressors on the spat during transport could potentially improve retention rates.

Growing mussels are removed from the dropper ropes and reseeded once and sometimes twice before reaching harvesting size of around 100 millimetres (4 in). Harvesting is achieved using specially designed vessels which allow the dropper ropes to be pulled on board to strip the mussels from the dropper rope. From the initial seeding of mussels onto farms until harvesting takes from 12 to 24 months.

Productivity of the mussel farming industry in the year 2000 in New Zealand was calculated to be 9.85 tonnes per hectare per year, or $NZ59,649 per hectare per year; this is 200 times the productivity of protein from land-based farming.

Mussel farming is a fast-growing industry in New Zealand. In 2000, 3,000 hectares (7,400 acres) of mussel farms were in production, with proposals for another 30,000 hectares (74,000 acres). Typically, individual farms are less than 50 hectares (120 acres) and placed in sheltered waters close to the shore. With more recent technological developments larger mussel farms can now be constructed further offshore and in more exposed waters.

After 15 years of research and development into hatchery production of spat, the industry still remains almost completely reliant on wild spat, because collecting wild spat is markedly cheaper than breeding mussels in a hatchery. However, it is likely hatcheries will become increasingly important in greenshell mussel aquaculture for two main reasons. First is the potential for producing a more valuable product because hatcheries are able to selectively breed for desired traits. Second, the reliability of hatchery seed is a more stable base for an industry relying on wild seed, particularly in years when wild spat numbers are low, and when the hatchery spat will attract a premium.

The New Zealand greenshell mussel industry operates within some of the strictest quality standards in the world. Both the mussels and seawater around the farms are tested for biotoxins, bacteria, and heavy metals. The water quality is constantly monitored with tests carried out to the standards set by the U.S Food and Drug Administration, European Union, and NZ Food Safety Authority. The standards are in place to meet the increasing global demand for safe and healthy seafood products. The Resource Management Act 1991 and Fisheries Act 1996 have been put in place by the New Zealand government to mitigate the environmental effects of aquaculture in New Zealand. New Zealand's high aquaculture standards have been recognized by the International Conservation Organisation Blue Ocean Institute, which ranked New Zealand greenshell mussels as one of the top two 'eco-friendly seafoods' in the world.

== Parasites ==
Male pea crab entering a green-lipped mussel hosting a female crab, infrared video

New Zealand greenshell mussel are often parasitized by pea crabs. In 2015, New Zealand researchers Oliver Trottier and Andrew Jeffs from University of Auckland studied the mate location behaviour of male New Zealand pea crabs, which were observed when dwelling in the mussel. Given the cryptic behaviour of the male crabs, a trapping system was developed to determine whether male crabs would exit their mussel hosts in response to an upstream female crab. Observations of the nocturnal mate-finding behaviour of male crabs were made in darkness using infrared video recordings. Male crabs were often observed stroking the mantle edge of the mussel whilst attempting to gain entry, successfully increasing mussel valve gape during entry from 3.7 to 5.5 millimetres (9/64 to 7/32 in).

== Medicinal effects ==
Perna canaliculus inhibits the 5-lipoxygenase pathway, which leads to the formation of leukotrienes. Many of the products of these pathways have inflammation-supporting properties. However, a 2006 systematic review of scientific research on supplementation with green-lipped mussel found "little consistent and compelling evidence" of any benefit for rheumatoid or osteoarthritis. However, subsequent placebo-controlled trials have shown that green-lipped mussels do show promise as an alternative therapy for joint issues. Another study on canines shows that a diet rich in green-lipped mussels yielded an improvement in pain and functioning in Osteoarthritic Dogs.

A lipid extract from this shellfish is sold under the brand name Lyprinol. A 2011 literature review found weak evidence of anti-inflammatory effects similar to fish oil, but noted that clinical trials to date had been limited. In 2000, two companies were successfully prosecuted and fined in New Zealand for making medicinal claims about Lyprinol without proof, including that it could act as a cancer cure. TVNZ was also found to have breached broadcasting standards by publishing the claims in a news story.

== See also ==
- Aquaculture in New Zealand
- Perna viridis
- Mytilus unguiculatus
