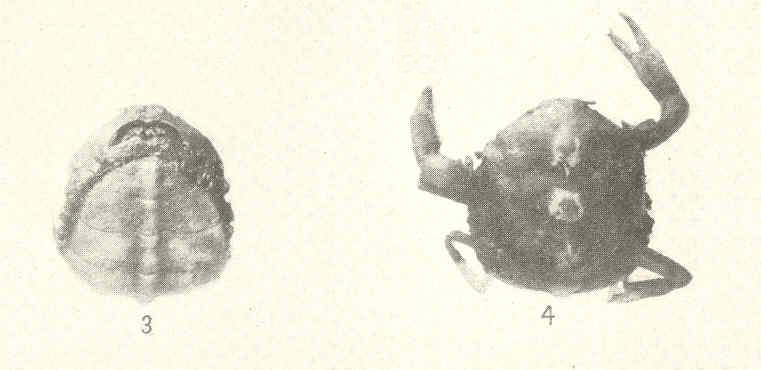

Scientific classification
- Kingdom: Animalia
- Phylum: Arthropoda
- Class: Malacostraca
- Order: Decapoda
- Suborder: Pleocyemata
- Infraorder: Brachyura
- Family: Pinnotheridae
- Subfamily: Pinnotherinae
- Genus: Tunicotheres; E. Campos, 1996
- Species: T. moseri

Binomial name
- Tunicotheres moseri (Rathbun, 1918)

Synonyms
- Pinnotheres moseri Rathbun, 1918

= Tunicotheres =

Genus of crabs

Tunicotheres is a monotypic genus of crabs in the family Pinnotheridae, and Tunicotheres moseri is the only species in the genus. This crab lives commensally in the atrial chamber of a small ascidian (sea squirt). It is found in the tropical western Atlantic Ocean, the Caribbean Sea and the Gulf of Mexico.

== Taxonomy ==
In Mary J. Rathbun's original description of this species, she placed it in the then broadly defined Pinnotheres. It remained there for most of the 20th century until Ernesto Campos, while revising the Pinnotheridae, noted that most species with a 2-segmented palp on the third maxilliped were anomalous in Pinnotheres. This led to the segregation of multiple genera, of which Tunicotheres, defined in 1996, was one.

== Description ==
Members of this family are tiny, soft-bodied crabs commonly known as pea crabs. Males of this species have carapace widths of up to 6 mm (0.24 in) and females of up to 13 mm (0.5 in).

== Ecology ==
This crab has been found as an endosymbiont of several species of host tunicate including Styela plicata, Phallusia nigra, Molgula occidentalis and Polycarpa spongiabilis. Usually, a single crab occupies the atrial chamber of a single tunicate. Questing males will seek to enter tunicates that are occupied by unberried females (those not brooding eggs), but will avoid those containing males, or females carrying eggs and developing larvae. Tunicotheres moseri has a reduced developmental cycle, with the eggs and all larval stages being retained in the brood pouch of the female. The developing young finally leave the abdominal pouch and the host tunicate as first instar juveniles.

The crabs are found in solitary residence in their tunicate host far more often than would be expected statistically. This seems to be due to territoriality, but does not occur because of aggression between a resident and an invading crab; the resident crab stations itself close to the atrial siphon and in most cases the intruder is deterred from attempting to enter. Additionally, the crabs seem to use an agonistic avoidance strategy and likely detect, by chemical or tactile cues, which tunicates are already occupied, moving on promptly from occupied hosts to find unoccupied ones.
