= Jewel box =

Jewel box or Jewel Box may refer to:

- Jewelry box, a container for gemstones

== Places or architecture ==
- Jewel Box (St. Louis), listed on the NRHP in Missouri
- Jewel Boxes, a name for eight banks designed by architect Louis Sullivan
- Jewel Box (baseball), a type of baseball park

== Star cluster ==
- Jewel Box (star cluster) (NGC 4755), a star cluster in Crux

== Music ==
- "Jewel Box", a track on Jeff Buckley's Sketches for My Sweetheart the Drunk
- The Jewel Box, a 1991 pasticcio opera with music by Wolfgang Amadeus Mozart and libretto by Paul Griffiths
- Elton: Jewel Box, an 8-disc compilation featuring rare songs by Elton John

== Biology ==
- Chamidae, a family of bivalves known as the jewelboxes
- Jewel-box pea crab, a common name for the Gemmotheres chamae crab

== Other ==
- Jewelbox (video game), a tetris-style arcade game for the Mac
- Jewel case, Jewel box or Super Jewel Box, types of Optical disc packaging
- Tomb of I'timād-ud-Daulah, at Agra is known as Jewel Box for its intricate parchin kari work
