= Alarconia =

Scientific classification
- Kingdom: Animalia
- Phylum: Arthropoda
- Class: Malacostraca
- Order: Decapoda
- Suborder: Pleocyemata
- Infraorder: Brachyura
- Family: Pinnotheridae
- Genus: Alarconia; Glassell, 1938

Genus of crabs

Alarconia is a genus of soft-bodied crab.

There are two species recognized in this genus:

- Alarconia guinotae Coelho, 1996
- Alarconia seaholmi Glassell, 1938
