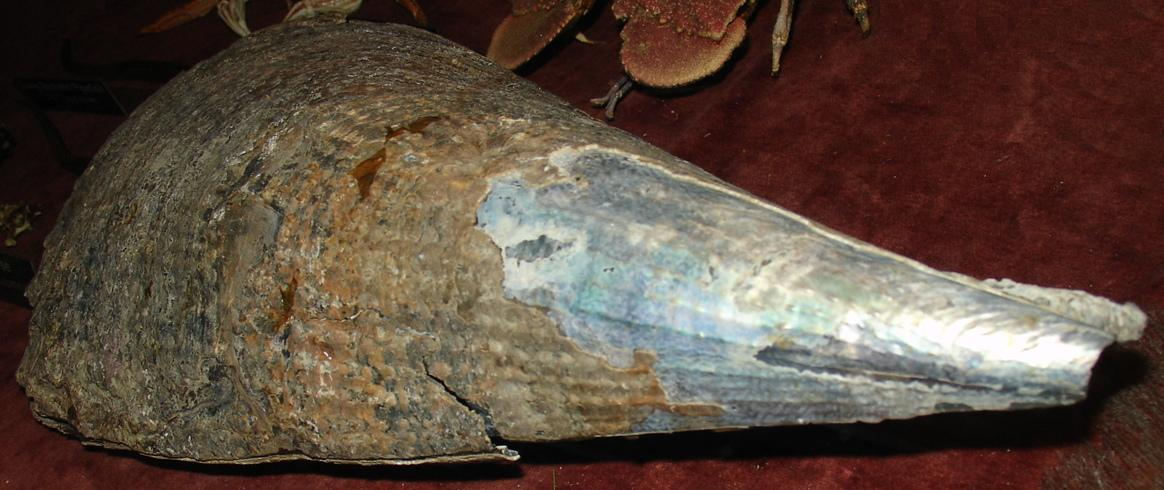
- A partly broken shell of Atrina zelandica

Scientific classification
- Kingdom: Animalia
- Phylum: Mollusca
- Class: Bivalvia
- Order: Pteriida
- Family: Pinnidae
- Genus: Atrina
- Species: A. zelandica

Binomial name
- Atrina zelandica (Gray in Yate, 1835)

= Atrina zelandica =

Species of bivalve

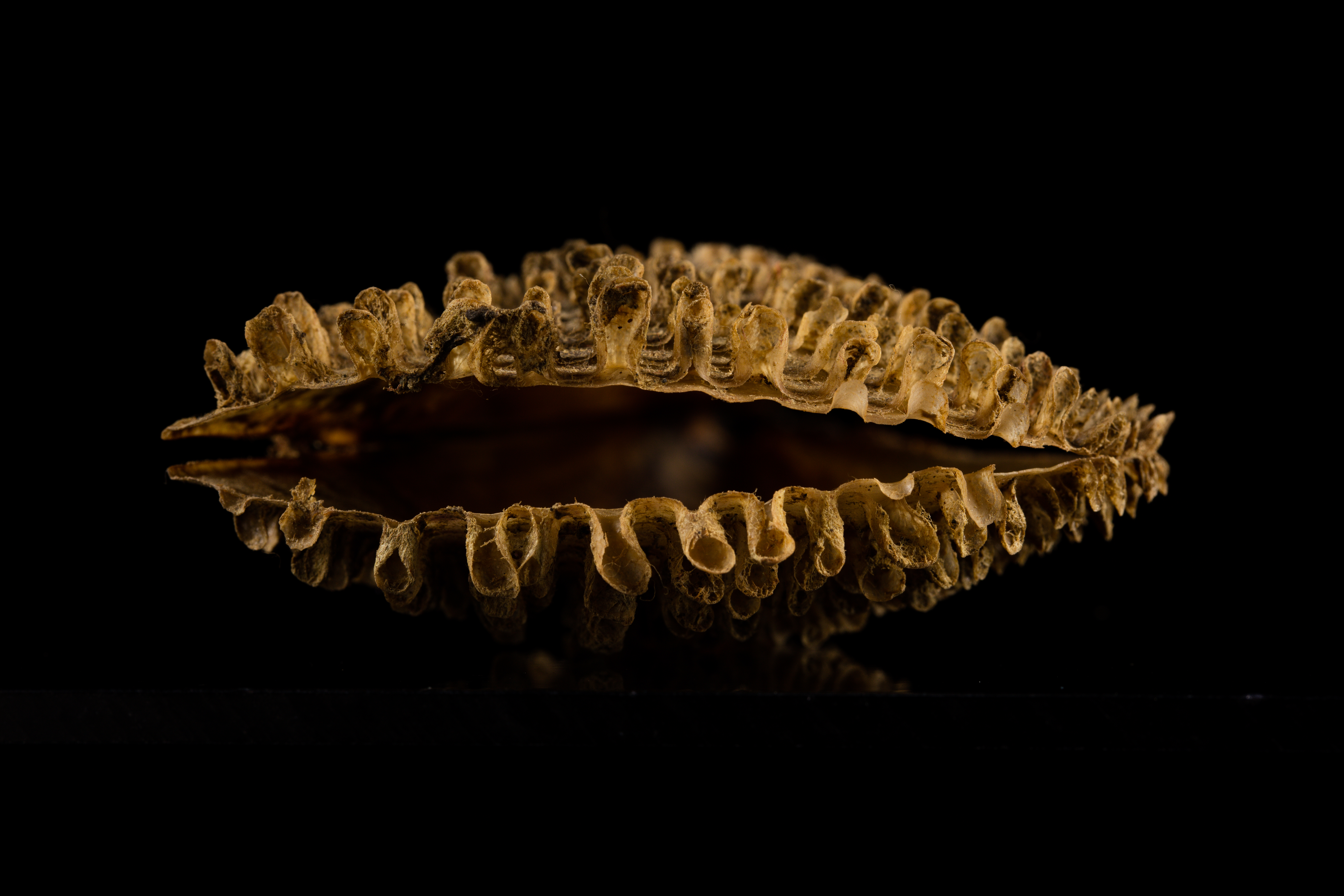
Mouth of A. zelandica

Atrina zelandica, one of several species known as the horse mussel, is a large species of saltwater clam. It is found around New Zealand.

== Description ==
The shell of Atrina zelandica is triangular, elongate and blackish, while the inside is pearly purple. The valves are convex with rather close longitudinal ribs and semi-cylindrical hollow spines. The body of Atrina zelandica is 280 mm long. Atrina zelandica is the largest of all bivalve species in New Zealand, with some individuals of Atrina zelandica growing up to 400 mm in length. Most individuals of Atrina zelandica are between 30-260 mm long and 100-110 mm wide.

The shell of Atrina zelandica has a crenellated posterior edge that extends a few centimeters above the substrate. This helps keep the water intake clear of surface deposits but also provides a surface for various algae and invertebrates to attach to it, such as sponges and sea squirts.

== Geographic distribution ==
Atrina zelandica is native to New Zealand. They inhabit depths of up to 50 m, primarily in muddy sand in the intertidal and subtidal zones in sheltered waters, and are widely distributed across the country.

However, Atrina zelandica has experienced frequent die-offs in the Rangitoto Channel. Populations of 200-300 individuals per square meter have decreased to just 1-35 individuals per square meter over a period of 2-3 years. Possible explanations include damage caused by storms, shell damage leading to increased predation and over harvesting.

== Life cycle ==
Atrina zelandica are classified as dioecious broadcast spawners. Atrina zelandica spawns during the summer months but there is currently no available research on the age or sizes that Atrina zelandica begins breeding. Atrina zelandica grows rapidly during the first few years of life, sometimes up to 40 mm a year, but once shells exceed 166 mm long their growth slows significantly. Individuals mature between 5 years and 15 years old.

== Diet ==
Atrina zelandica is a filter feeder and eats algae and bacteria.

== Parasites ==
Atrina zelandica is parasitized by Pinnotheres novae-zelandiae. P. novae-zelandiae can cause significant problems for Atrina zelandica because they cause slow growth.
