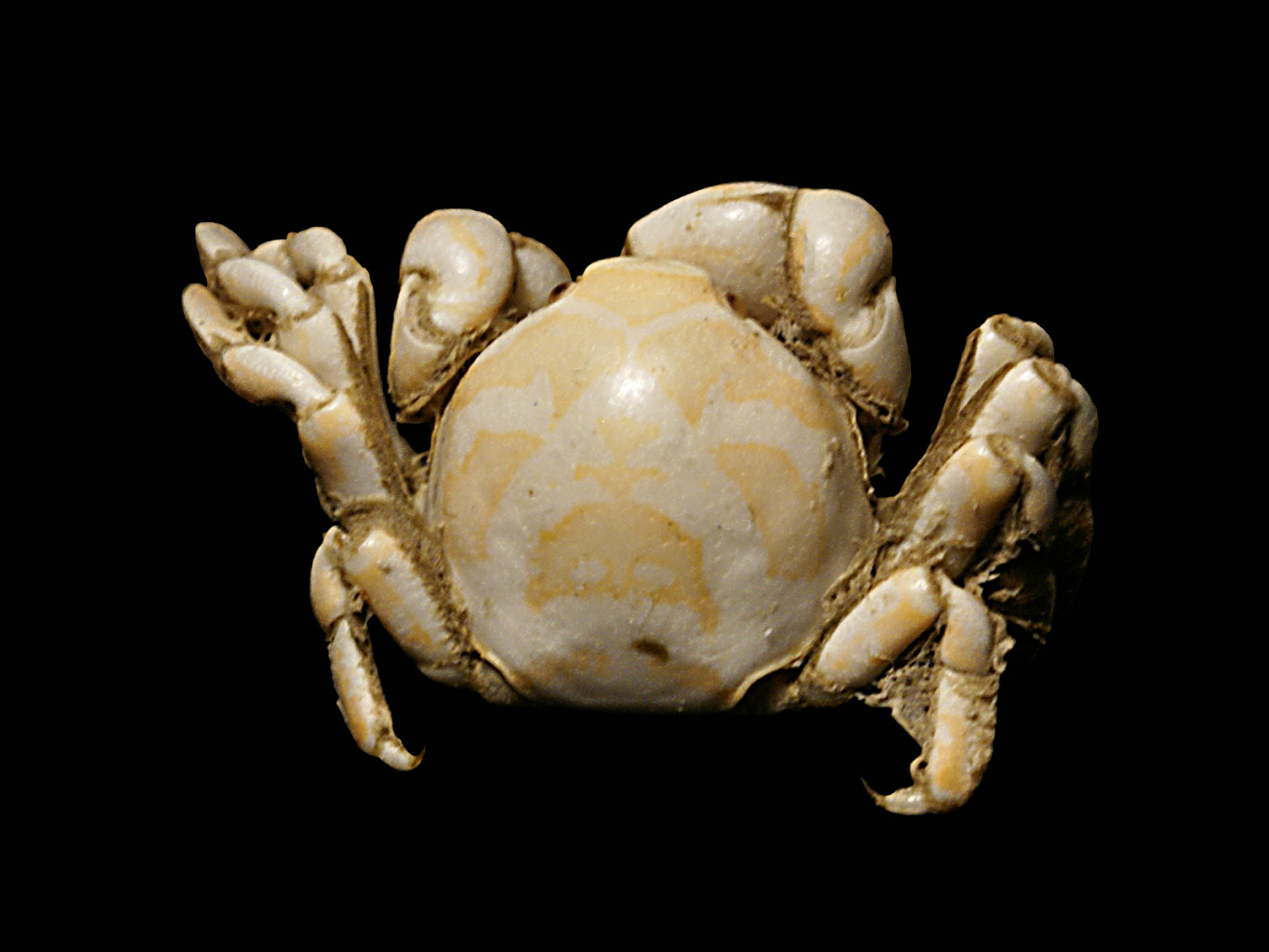
- Pinnotheres pisum ♂

Scientific classification
- Kingdom: Animalia
- Phylum: Arthropoda
- Class: Malacostraca
- Order: Decapoda
- Suborder: Pleocyemata
- Infraorder: Brachyura
- Family: Pinnotheridae
- Genus: Pinnotheres; Bosc, 1802

Synonyms
- Pinnozoea Aikawa, 1933

= Pinnotheres =

Genus of crabs

Pinnotheres is a genus of crabs, including the pea crab. Many species formerly in Pinnotheres have been placed in new genera, such as Zaops ostreus (formerly P. ostreus), the oyster crab and Nepinnotheres novaezelandiae (formerly P. novaezelandiae), the New Zealand pea crab. The species currently recognised in the genus Pinnotheres are:

- Pinnotheres atrinae Sakai, 1939
- Pinnotheres atrinicola Page, 1983
- Pinnotheres bidentatus Sakai, 1939
- Pinnotheres bipunctatus Nicolet, 1849
- Pinnotheres boninensis Stimpson, 1858
- Pinnotheres borradailei Nobili, 1905
- Pinnotheres corbiculae Sakai, 1939
- Pinnotheres coutierei Nobili, 1905
- Pinnotheres cyclinus Gordon, 1932
- Pinnotheres dilatatus Shen, 1932
- Pinnotheres dofleini Lenz, 1914
- Pinnotheres edwardsi de Man, 1887
- Pinnotheres excussus Dai, Feng, Song & Chen, 1980
- Pinnotheres globosus Hombron & Jacquinot, 1846
- Pinnotheres gordonae Shen, 1932
- Pinnotheres guerini H. Milne-Edwards, 1853
- Pinnotheres haiyangensis Shen, 1932
- Pinnotheres hanumantharaoi Devi & Shyamasundari, 1989
- Pinnotheres hemphilli Rathbun, 1918
- Pinnotheres hickmani (Guiler, 1950)
- Pinnotheres hirtimanus H. Milne-Edwards, 1853
- Pinnotheres jamesi Rathbun, 1923
- Pinnotheres kamensis Rathbun, 1909
- Pinnotheres kutensis Rathbun, 1900
- Pinnotheres lanensis Rathbun, 1909
- Pinnotheres laquei Sakai, 1961
- Pinnotheres latipes Jacquinot in Hombron & Jacquinot, 1846
- Pinnotheres lithodomi Smith, 1870
- Pinnotheres luminatus Dai, Feng, Song & Chen, 1980
- Pinnotheres lutescens Nobili, 1905
- Pinnotheres mactricola Alcock, 1900
- Pinnotheres maindroni Nobili, 1905
- Pinnotheres margaritiferae Laurie, 1906
- Pinnotheres nigrans Rathbun, 1909
- Pinnotheres obesus Dana, 1852
- Pinnotheres obscuridentata Dai & Song, 1986
- Pinnotheres obscurus Stimpson, 1858
- Pinnotheres onychodactylus Tesch, 1918
- Pinnotheres orcutti Rathbun, 1918
- Pinnotheres ostrea (Aikawa, 1933)
- Pinnotheres paralatissimus Dai & Song, 1986
- Pinnotheres parvulus Stimpson, 1858
- Pinnotheres pectunculi Hesse, 1872
- Pinnotheres perezi Nobili, 1905
- Pinnotheres pholadis De Haan, 1835
- Pinnotheres pichilinquei Rathbun, 1923
- Pinnotheres pilulus Dai, Feng, Song & Chen, 1980
- Pinnotheres pilumnoides Nobili, 1905
- Pinnotheres pisum (Linnaeus, 1767)
- Pinnotheres pubescens (Holmes, 1894)
- Pinnotheres pugettensis Holmes, 1900
- Pinnotheres purpureus Alcock, 1900
- Pinnotheres quadratus Rathbun, 1909
- Pinnotheres ridgewayi Southwell, 1911
- Pinnotheres rouxi H. Milne-Edwards, 1853
- Pinnotheres sanguinolariae Pillai, 1951
- Pinnotheres sebastianensis (Rodrigues da Costa, 1970)
- Pinnotheres serrignathus Shen, 1932
- Pinnotheres shoemakeri Rathbun, 1918
- Pinnotheres siamensis Rathbun, 1909
- Pinnotheres socius Lanchester, 1902
- Pinnotheres taichungae K. Sakai, 2000
- Pinnotheres taylori Rathbun, 1918
- Pinnotheres tenuipes Borradaile, 1903
- Pinnotheres trichopus Tesch, 1918
- Pinnotheres tsingtaoensis Shen, 1932
- Pinnotheres vicajii Chhapgar, 1957
