= Orotava cribrata =

Scientific classification
- Kingdom: Animalia
- Phylum: Arthropoda
- Class: Insecta
- Order: Diptera
- Family: Tephritidae
- Subfamily: Tephritinae
- Tribe: Tephritini
- Genus: Orotava
- Species: O. cribrata

Binomial name
- Orotava cribrata (Bigot, 1891)

Synonyms
- Tephritis cribrata Bigot, 1891; Sphenella caudata Becker, 1908

Species of fly

Orotava cribrata is a species of tephritid or fruit flies in the genus Orotava of the family Tephritidae.

== Distribution ==
Canary Islands.
