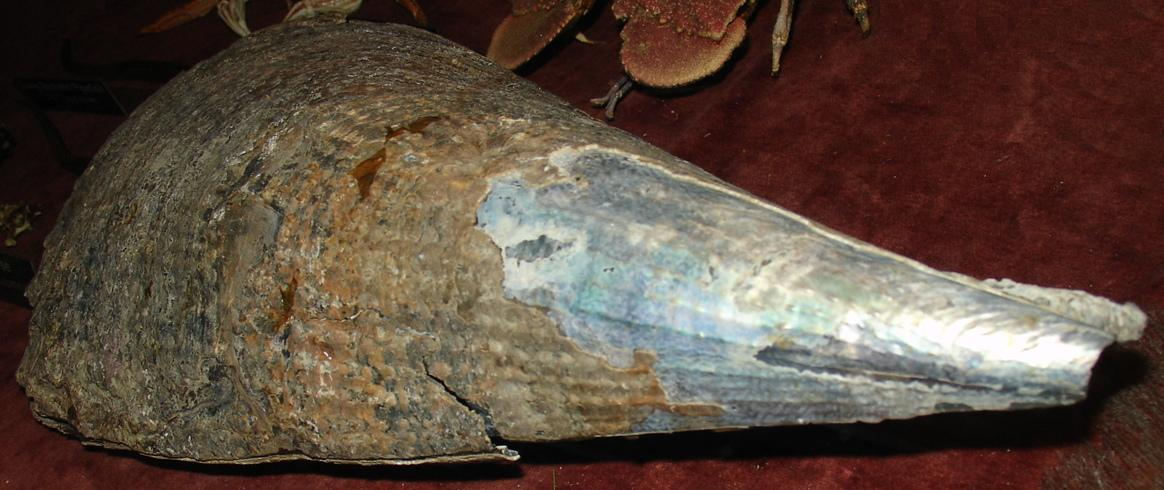
- Atrina zelandica
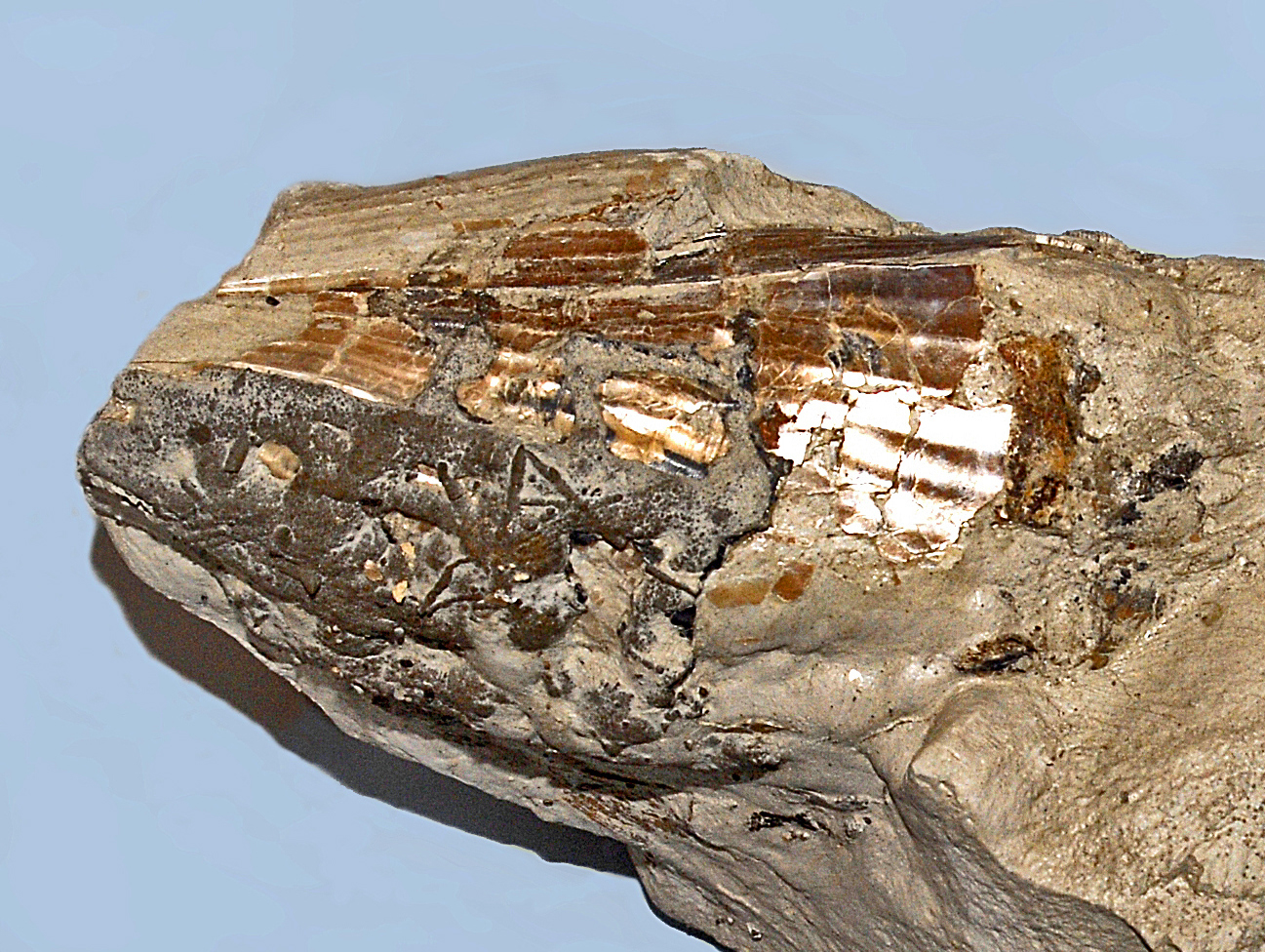
- Fossil of Atrina pectinata

Scientific classification
- Domain: Eukaryota
- Kingdom: Animalia
- Phylum: Mollusca
- Class: Bivalvia
- Order: Pteriida
- Family: Pinnidae
- Genus: Atrina; Gray, 1847

= Atrina =

Atrina Temporal range: Triassic - Recent

Genus of bivalves

Atrina is a cosmopolitan genus of bivalve molluscs belonging to the family Pinnidae.

A typical species is A. fragilis, found in British waters. A. rigida (Lightfoot, 1786) is found on the southeast coast of North America and in the West Indies. The type species is A. nigra (Dillwyn, 1817, originally P. nigra).

Atrina is considered to represent the more primitive form within the Pinnidae; however, both genera Pinna and Atrina are very ancient. The genus Atrina is represented within the fossil record from the Triassic period to the Quaternary period (age range: 242.0 to 0.0 million years ago). These fossils have been found all over the world.

== Description ==
Molluscs within this genus are characterized by elongated, wedge-shaped shells, distinguished from the genus Pinna by the lack of any grooves in the nacreous lining of the shell, and by the central positioning of the adductor scar.

As with other pen shells (Pinnidae) they commonly stand point-first in the sea bottom in which they live, anchored by net of byssus threads.

== Species ==
Species within the genus Atrina include:

- Atrina affinis Sowerby, 1821†
- Atrina argentea Conrad, 1848†
- Atrina assimilis (Reeve, 1858)
- Atrina chautardi (Nicklès, 1953)
- Atrina chinensis (Deshayes, 1841)
- Atrina cumingii (Reeve, 1858)
- Atrina exusta (Gmelin, 1791)
- Atrina fragilis (Pennant, 1777) — fan mussel
- Atrina harrisii Dall, 1898†
- Atrina hystrix (Hanley, 1858)
- Atrina inflata (Dillwyn, 1817)
- Atrina jacksoniana Dall, 1898†
- Atrina japonica (Reeve, 1858)
- Atrina kinoshitai Habe, 1953
- Atrina lischkeana (Clessin, 1891)
- Atrina magellanica Ihering, 1907†
- Atrina marquesana P. W. Schultz & M. Huber, 2013
- Atrina maura (G. B. Sowerby I, 1835)
- Atrina nigra (Dillwyn, 1817)
- Atrina oldroydii Dall, 1901
- Atrina pectinata (Linnaeus, 1767)
- Atrina penna (Reeve, 1858)
- Atrina pini P. W. Schultz & M. Huber, 2013
- Atrina piscatoria Glenn, 1904†
- Atrina recta Dall, Bartsch & Rehder, 1938
- Atrina rigida (Lightfoot, 1786) — stiff pen shell
- Atrina rosenkrantzi Schnetler & M. S. Nielsen, 2018 †
- Atrina seminuda (Lamarck, 1819) — half-naked pen shell
- Atrina serra (Reeve, 1858)
- Atrina serrata (Sowerby, 1825) — saw-toothed pen shell
- Atrina squamifera (Sowerby, 1835)
- Atrina stephensi Hanna, 1926†
- Atrina strangei (Reeve, 1858)
- Atrina talarensis Olsson, 1928†
- Atrina tasmanica (Tenison Woods, 1876)
- Atrina teramachii Habe, 1953
- Atrina texta Hertlein, Hanna & A. M. Strong, 1943
- Atrina tuberculosa (G. B. Sowerby I, 1835)
- Atrina vexillum (Born, 1778) — flag pen shell
- Atrina zelandica (Gray in Yate, 1835) — the horse mussel
