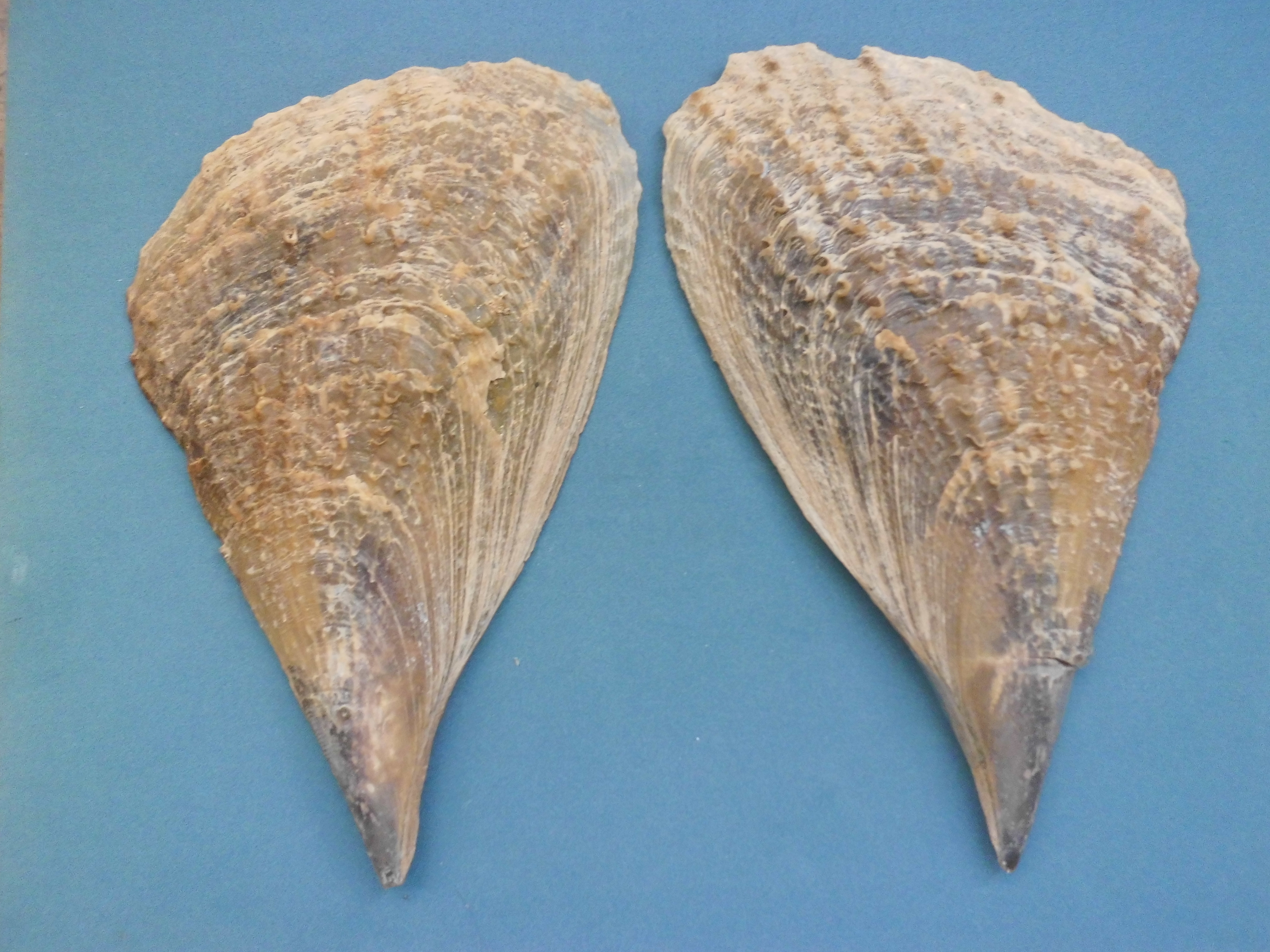

Scientific classification
- Kingdom: Animalia
- Phylum: Mollusca
- Class: Bivalvia
- Order: Pteriida
- Family: Pinnidae
- Genus: Atrina
- Species: A. seminuda

Binomial name
- Atrina seminuda (Lamarck, 1819)

= Atrina seminuda =

Species of bivalve

Atrina seminuda, the half-naked pen shell, is a species of bivalve mollusc in the family Pinnidae.

== Description ==
It is characterized by a large shell between about 150–200 mm in triangular or wedge, the leaflets have ornamentations forming rows 10-20 tubular radial spiny projections which are often slightly curved. The surface of the leaflets tend to observe fine markings which correspond to the long lines. The coloration is variable ranging from dark brown to greenish brown. In the animal body highlights large posterior adductor muscle development, which in individuals of sizes between 150 and 200 mm can reach a diameter of about 40 mm.

== Distribution ==
It can be found along the Atlantic coast of North America, ranging from North Carolina to Texas and south to Argentina. For the Venezuelan Caribbean has been appointed to the coasts of the states of Vargas, Miranda, Anzoátegui, Sucre and Nueva Esparta.

=== Habitat ===
Atrina seminuda, is an endobenthic inhabitant, usually secured by a strong byssus secreted by the animal in rocks and gravel substrate in areas of high energy. Associated with the outer faces of the leaflets of Atrina seminuda usually inhabit a range of fouling organisms among them being common gastropod mollusks, bivalves and chitons.

== Gallery ==
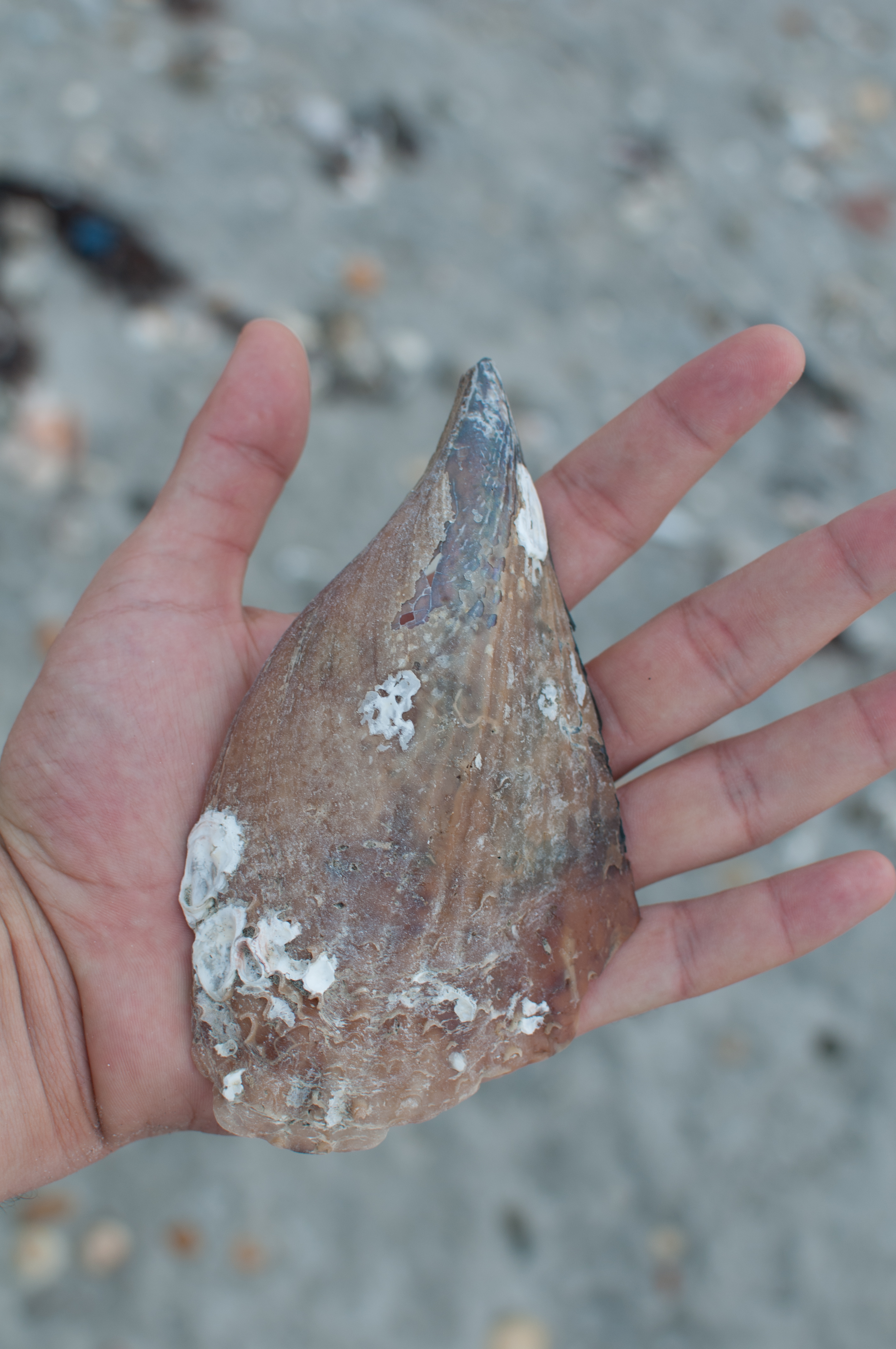
External view of a bivalve Atrina seminuda where you can see epibionts associated with this species.

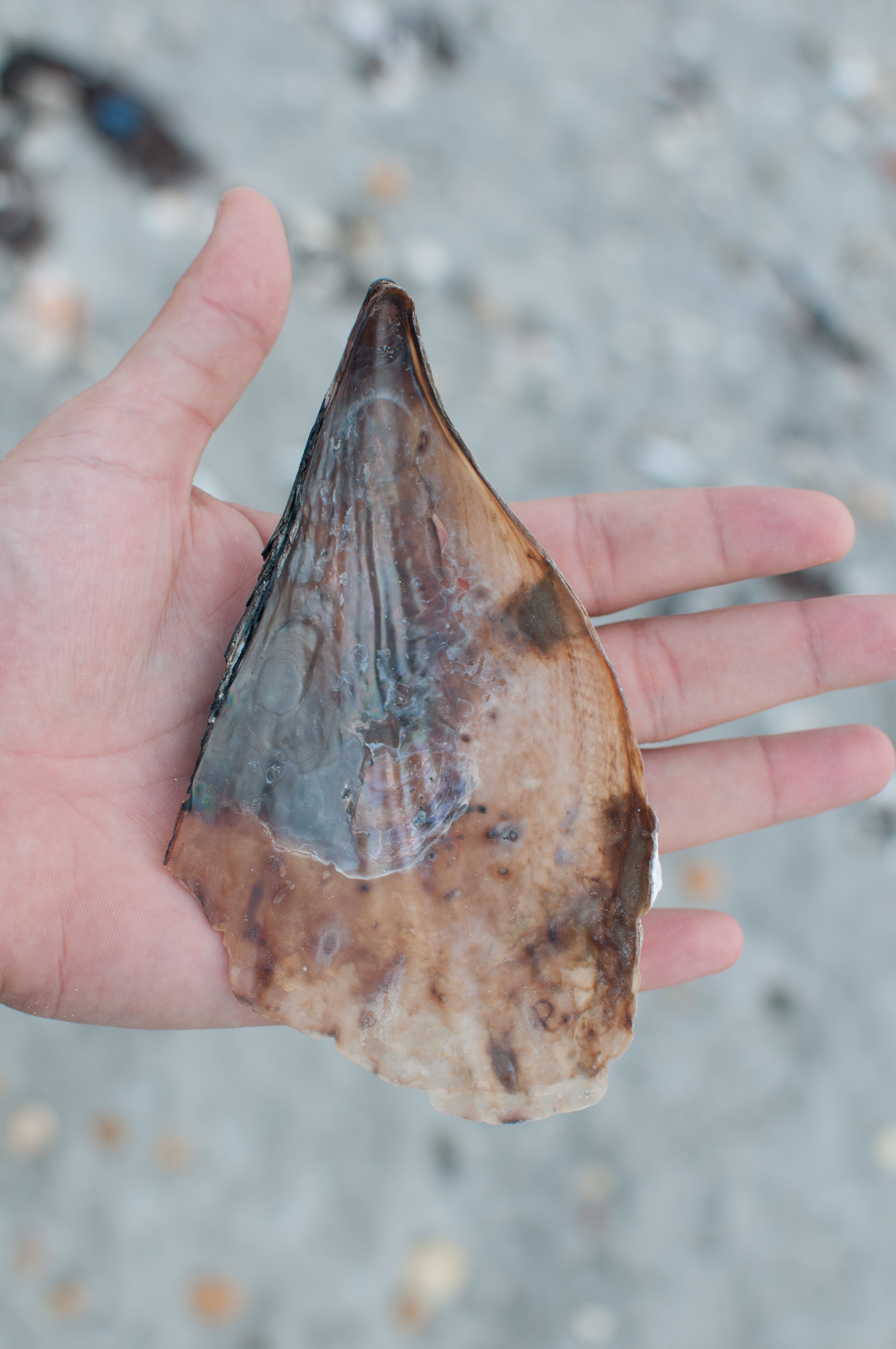
Internal view of a leaflet Atrina seminuda

== Commons names ==
Venezuelan folk tradition on its shores this bivalve is known under several names like so: rompechinchorro, hacha, cocha abanico, papa reina y cucharon
