= Viridotheres =

Scientific classification
- Kingdom: Animalia
- Phylum: Arthropoda
- Class: Malacostraca
- Order: Decapoda
- Suborder: Pleocyemata
- Infraorder: Brachyura
- Family: Pinnotheridae
- Genus: Viridotheres; Manning, 1996

Type species
- Nepinnotheres viridis Manning, 1993

Genus of crabs

Viridotheres is a genus of crabs of the family Pinnotheridae.

== Taxonomy ==
Viridotheres contains the following species:

- Viridotheres asaphis Ahyong, 2020
- Viridotheres buergeri (Rathbun, 1909)
- Viridotheres cygnus Ahyong, 2020
- Viridotheres gracilis (Bürger, 1895)
- Viridotheres indicus Mitra & Ng, 2025
- Viridotheres kupang Ahyong, 2019
- Viridotheres lillyae (Manning, 1993)
- Viridotheres marionae Manning, 1996
- Viridotheres otto Ahyong & Ng, 2007
- Viridotheres sanguinolariae (Pillai, 1951)
- Viridotheres takedai Ahyong, Komai & Watanabe, 2012
- Viridotheres viridis (Manning, 1993)
