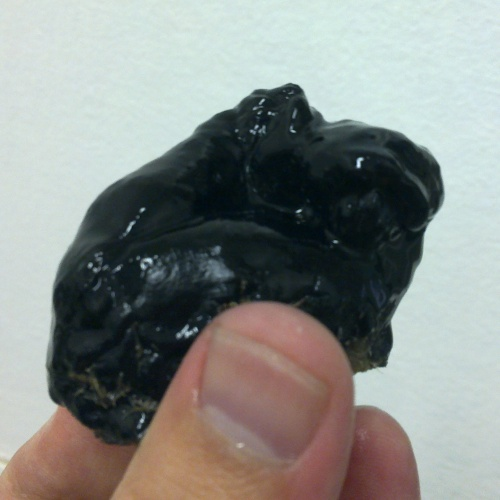

Scientific classification
- Domain: Eukaryota
- Kingdom: Animalia
- Phylum: Chordata
- Subphylum: Tunicata
- Class: Ascidiacea
- Order: Phlebobranchia
- Family: Ascidiidae
- Genus: Phallusia
- Species: P. nigra

Binomial name
- Phallusia nigra Savigny, 1816

Synonyms
- List: Ascidia atra Lesueur, 1823; Ascidia nigra (Savigny, 1816); Ascidia somalensis Sluiter, 1905; Ascidia somaliensis Sluiter, 1905; Phallusia atra (Lesueur, 1823); Phallusia violacea Gould, 1852; Phallusiopsis nigra (Savigny, 1816); Thallusia nigra (Savigny, 1816); Tunica nigra (Savigny, 1816)

= Phallusia nigra =

Species of sea squirt

Phallusia nigra is a solitary marine tunicate of the ascidian class found in tropical seas around the world. It usually lives in shallow waters, attached to any hard substrate.

Like all tunicates, P. nigra has a thick leathery envelope (tunic) containing cellulosic material. Like all solitary ascidians, the tunic encloses a sac-shaped body with separate water entrance and exit tubes (siphons). It lives on plankton that it filters from seawater with a mucous net. This tunicate is often host to the small symbiotic pea crab Tunicotheres moseri which takes up residence in its atrial chamber.

An adult P. nigra may be 10 cm (4 in) long. The tunic is usually velvet black or dark brown, but may be gray in specimens that are younger or live in shaded areas. Its original range is unclear; the tropical Western Atlantic Ocean, the Red Sea, and the Indian Ocean have been proposed.

The tunic of P. nigra contains many vesicles filled with a strong acid (with pH near 1), containing mostly sulphate SO_{4}^{2−} and chloride (Cl^{−}) anions. The vesicles are concentrated towards the outer surface and are easily ruptured by contact; they are believed to protect the animal from predation and fouling.

Substances extracted from the dried tunic with methanol have been found to have cytotoxic, antibacterial, antipyretic, analgesic, and histamine-like activity.
