= Orotava hamula =

Scientific classification
- Kingdom: Animalia
- Phylum: Arthropoda
- Class: Insecta
- Order: Diptera
- Family: Tephritidae
- Subfamily: Tephritinae
- Tribe: Tephritini
- Genus: Orotava
- Species: O. hamula

Binomial name
- Orotava hamula (Meijere, 1914)

Synonyms
- Tephritis hamulus Meijere, 1914; Paratephritis naucina Hering, 1952; Paratephritis senecionis Ito, 1953

Species of fly

Orotava hamula is a species of tephritid or fruit flies in the genus Orotava of the family Tephritidae.

== Distribution ==
Japan, Indonesia.
