= Horse mussel =

Horse mussel or horsemussel may refer to:

- Atrina squamifera
- Atrina zelandica
- Modiolus modiolus
- any species in the genus Modiolus
