= Orotava =

Scientific classification
- Kingdom: Animalia
- Phylum: Arthropoda
- Class: Insecta
- Order: Diptera
- Family: Tephritidae
- Subfamily: Tephritinae
- Tribe: Tephritini
- Genus: Orotava; Frey, 1936

Type species
- Sphenella caudata Becker, 1908

Synonyms
- Westermannia Lioy, 1864

Genus of flies

Orotava is a genus of tephritid or fruit flies in the family Tephritidae.

== Species ==
- Orotava cribrata (Bigot, 1891)
- Orotava hamula (Meijere, 1914)
