= Crepidula cachimilla =

Scientific classification
- Kingdom: Animalia
- Phylum: Mollusca
- Class: Gastropoda
- Subclass: Caenogastropoda
- Order: Littorinimorpha
- Family: Calyptraeidae
- Genus: Crepidula
- Species: C. cachimilla

Binomial name
- Crepidula cachimilla Cledon, Simone & Penchaszadeh, 2004

Species of gastropod

Crepidula cachimilla is a species of sea snail, a marine gastropod mollusk in the family Calyptraeidae, the slipper snails or slipper limpets, cup-and-saucer snails, and Chinese hat snails.

== Distribution ==
The species was described based on specimens from southwestern Atlantic Ocean in Golfo San Matías, Argentina (type locality).

== Description ==
The maximum recorded shell length is 52.2 mm. The species is morphologically distinct from other species of Crepidula. These anatomical differences include a projecting apex and the absence of a periostracum. It also has a thicker columellar muscle than other mature Atlantic species of Crepidula.

== Habitat ==
Minimum recorded depth is 10 m. Maximum recorded depth is 20 m. It attaches to hard substrata.
