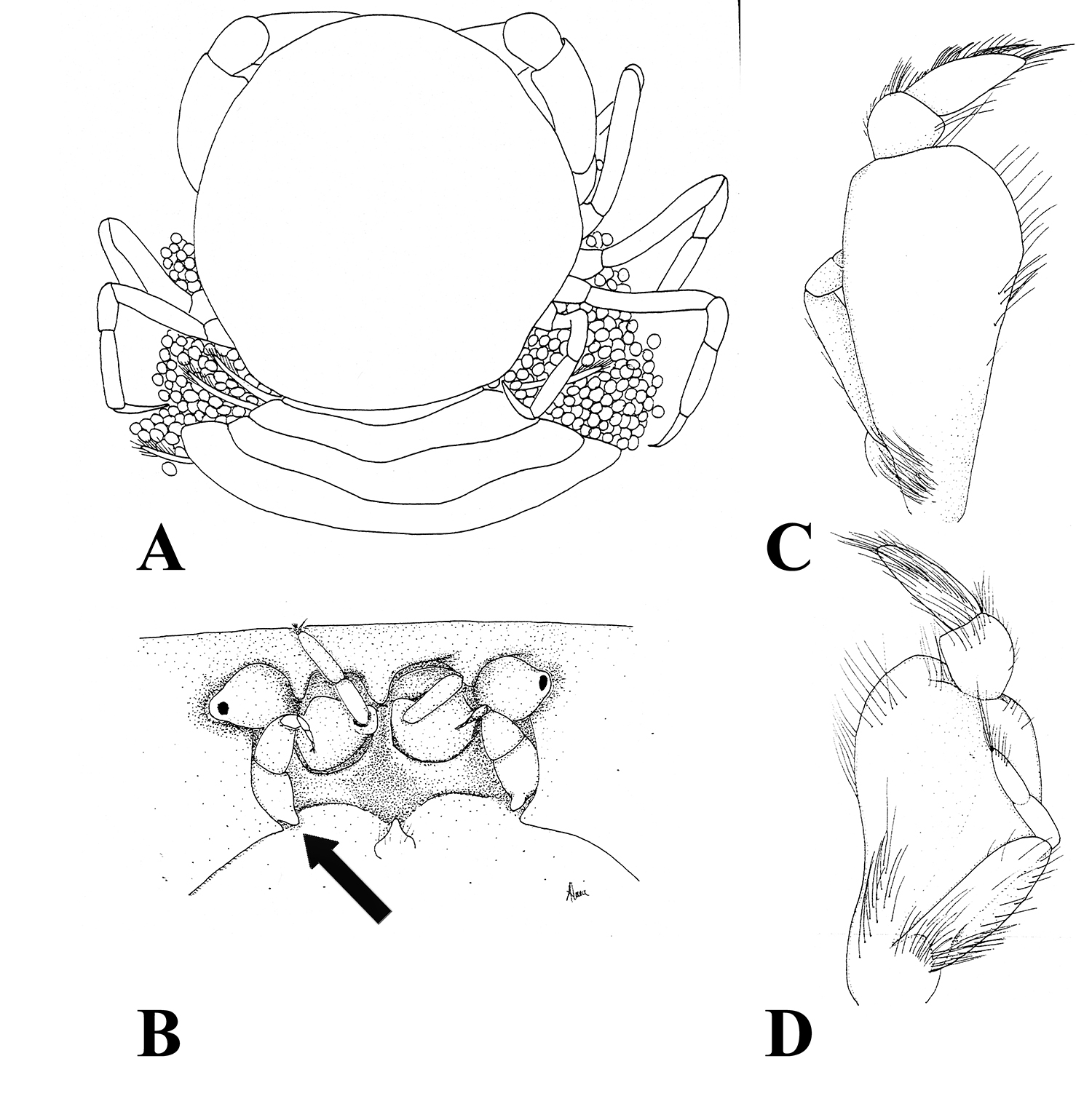

Scientific classification
- Kingdom: Animalia
- Phylum: Arthropoda
- Class: Malacostraca
- Order: Decapoda
- Suborder: Pleocyemata
- Infraorder: Brachyura
- Family: Pinnotheridae
- Genus: Gemmotheres; Campos, 1996
- Species: G. chamae

Binomial name
- Gemmotheres chamae (M. H. Roberts, 1975)

Synonyms
- Pinnotheres chamae M. H. Roberts, 1975

= Gemmotheres =

Genus of crabs

Gemmotheres also known as the jewel-box pea crab, is a monotypic genus of pea crab, which was erected in 1996 to hold the species Gemmotheres chamae (formerly Pinnotheres chamae). The species lives as a commensal of the corrugate jewelbox, Chama congregata.
