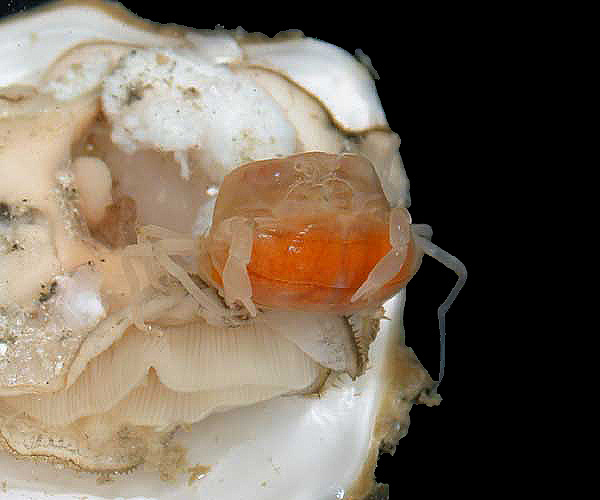
- Zaops ostreum on Crassostrea virginica

Scientific classification
- Kingdom: Animalia
- Phylum: Arthropoda
- Clade: Pancrustacea
- Class: Malacostraca
- Order: Decapoda
- Suborder: Pleocyemata
- Infraorder: Brachyura
- Family: Pinnotheridae
- Genus: Zaops
- Species: Z. ostreum

Binomial name
- Zaops ostreum (Say, 1817)

Synonyms
- Pinnotheres Ostreum Say, 1817; Pinnotheres depressum Say, 1817; Zaops ostreus Say, 1817 [misspelling]

= Oyster crab =

Species of crab

The oyster crab (Zaops ostreum) is a small, whitish or translucent crab in the family Pinnotheridae. It is parasitic on its oyster (bivalve mollusc) hosts.

== Description and habitat ==
Oyster crabs are small in size, typically measuring around 1 to 2 centimeters in width. They have a flattened body shape with a round carapace (shell) and relatively short legs. Their coloration can vary but often includes shades of brown, gray, or green, helping them blend in with their surroundings. Male oyster crabs are often smaller than females.

- Oyster crabs are commonly found inhabiting oyster beds and other shellfish habitats in coastal regions.
- They are often associated with bivalve mollusks, particularly oysters, with which they often have a parasitic relationship.

Oyster crabs primarily inhabit oyster beds, which are found in coastal waters. These beds serve as vital ecosystems for many species of Zaops. The structure of oyster beds provides a complex habitat that offers food, shelter, and breeding grounds for a diverse range of organisms, including the oyster crab. Estuaries and coastal bays provide ideal conditions for oysters to thrive, which in turn supports the populations of oyster crabs. These environments are particularly significant for oyster crabs because they often have brackish water - a mixture of fresh and saltwater. The variability of salinity, temperature, and nutrient availability in these areas can influence the distribution and health of oyster populations and consequently the oyster crabs that depend on it. In regions where mangroves are present, oyster populations can establish on the roots and trunks of mangrove trees, creating a unique habitat that oyster crabs may also inhabit. These swamps offer a different ecological niche with shelter from predators and a rich source of food material. In some areas, artificial reefs created for oyster restoration and to enhance fisheries can also become habitats for oyster crabs. These man-made structures can support oyster colonies, which in turn provide potential habitats for the crabs.

== Ecology ==
It is less than half an inch across, and lives inside the gills of an oyster or a clam. It uses the oyster for protection and lives on the food that the oyster gets for itself. It is found in oysters in the North Atlantic Ocean.

Many animals are predators of oyster crabs, including humans.

Oyster crabs can be found as parasites on various hosts such as bivalves (oysters, mussels, clams, scallops, and cockles), which are located using chemical detection. The host type depends on the life stage of the individual; larvae typically feed on plankton while adults tend to parasitize oysters. Specifically, oysters are used as housing and protection, as well as a food source. The oyster crab first invades its bivalve host during its first crab stage (after larval stage) before it develops into the hard-shell stage. Then, the oyster crab attaches to and scrapes food off of the oyster’s gills, which are used to filter food particles and various microorganisms (dinoflagellates and diatoms) out of the water. This oyster does not benefit in the process, its gills being constantly pierced and abraded until its ability to filter out food is hindered. An oyster may also bring in small crustaceans that it does not feed on, but are a part of the oyster crab’s diet. Once an oyster crab has reached its hard-shell stage, it will stay in its oyster if it is a female, or will leave its host as a male in search of females who have remained immotile. This is the only completely free-swimming stage of the oyster crab. Once copulation has taken place, males typically die while females live long enough to lay eggs.

As the growth rate of the host increases, so does the growth rate of the oyster crab, regardless of its current stage of development in its life cycle.

== Geographic range ==
Oyster crabs are found in coastal, neritic regions waters all over the world. Off of every coast in the Pacific, Atlantic, Southern, and Indian oceans, it is likely that oyster crabs will be observed. These observations of oyster crabs in these coastal areas are closely related to oyster bays. The reason for these correlations is the oyster crabs make habitats out of the oyster bays, and many organisms, including oyster crabs, inhabit oyster bays as well.

== Habitat preferences ==
Oyster crabs inhabit a wide range of invertebrate bivalves for nutrition and shelter. Habitat preferences are dependent on oyster crab sex. Male oyster crabs are considered to be free-living, leaving their host after the hard shell stage in search for a female oyster crab. Female oyster crabs find a suitable host where it will thrive until reaching sexual maturity and lay eggs inside the host. Both male and female oyster crabs parasitize a bivalve as a first stage larva. Oyster crabs have been found within the gills of the mantle cavity or within the water conduction system of molluscs. A bivalve can house one or a few oyster crabs but infestations do not rise above more than one female oyster crab. Their habitat regions include intertidal saltwater and marine aquatic biomes along the Atlantic and Pacific oceans.

== Distribution ==
Zaops ostreum is found along the eastern seaboards of North America and South America, from Massachusetts to Brazil, including the Gulf of Mexico and the Caribbean Sea. They are also distributed along the Atlantic coast of North America, ranging from Nova Scotia in Canada to Florida in the United States.

== Reproduction ==
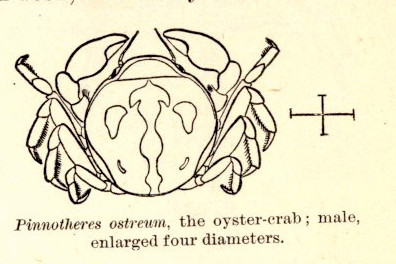
Male Zaops ostreums

Oyster crabs become sexually mature when they reach the hard stage. Males do not mature beyond this, but females will typically undergo four more stages, losing their swimming legs and growing a wider abdomen to become ovigerous (egg-bearing). Once females have fully matured, they become sedentary, never leaving their host.

Eventually, mature males will leave their bivalves in search of a female, locating them using their pheromones. Males are usually smaller and flatter, allowing them to slip into the bivalve harboring the female. The males exhibit polygyny mating. They mate with more than one female in different host bivalves. Oyster crabs are known to have precopulatory courtship rituals, consisting of tactile and olfactory cues. Eggs carried by the female's pleopods are fertilized through indirect sperm transfer. They can carry 7,957 to 9,456 eggs, holding them for up to 5 weeks. Oyster crab females begin producing one batch of eggs the first year and after the second or third year, they can increase to two batches. Once the eggs have developed into free-swimming zoeae, they will leave the mother's oyster in search of their own.
