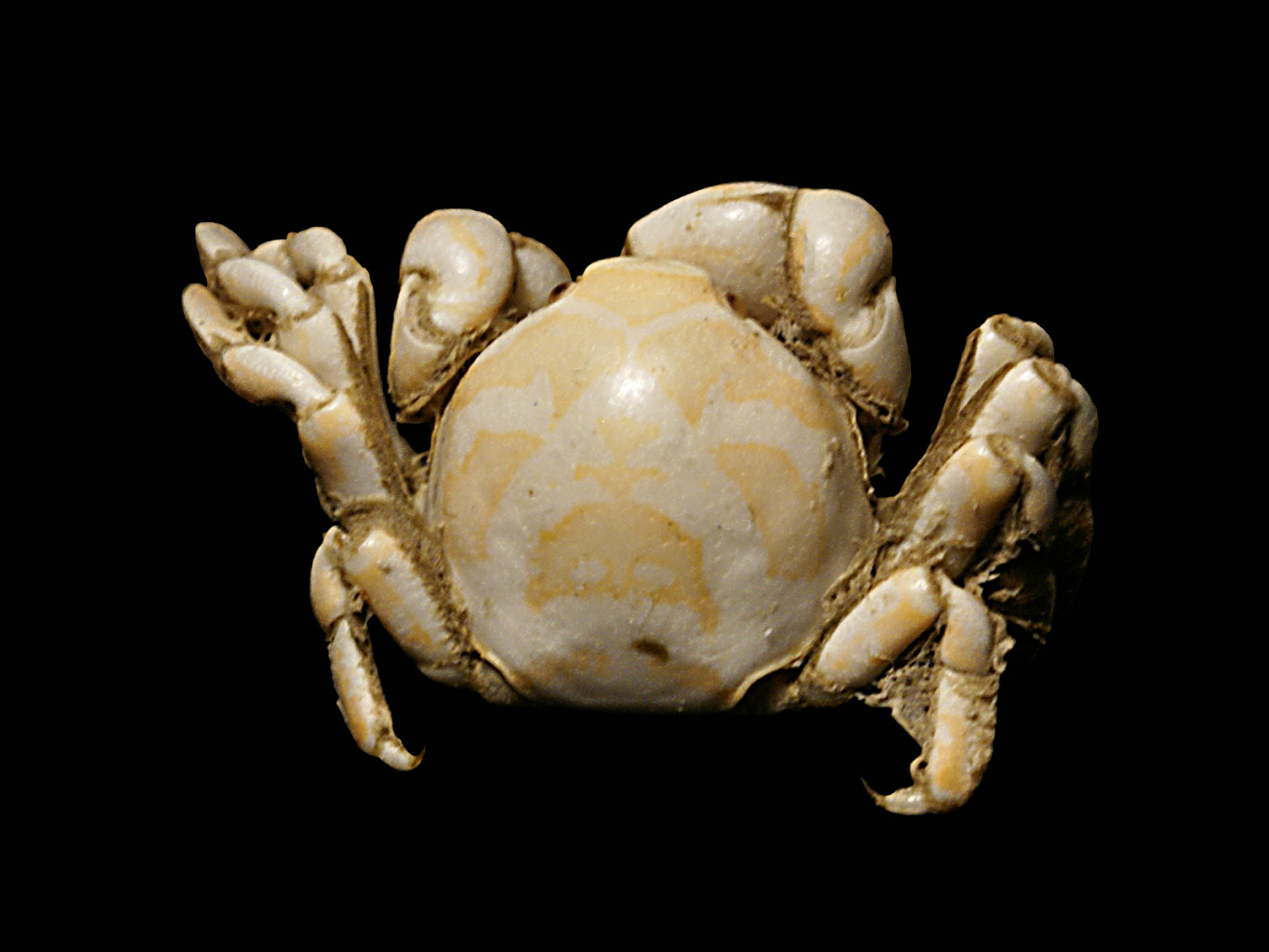
- Pinnotheres pisum ♂

Scientific classification
- Kingdom: Animalia
- Phylum: Arthropoda
- Clade: Pancrustacea
- Class: Malacostraca
- Order: Decapoda
- Suborder: Pleocyemata
- Infraorder: Brachyura
- Family: Pinnotheridae
- Genus: Pinnotheres
- Species: P. pisum

Binomial name
- Pinnotheres pisum (Linnaeus, 1767)

Synonyms
- Pinnotheres cranchii Leach, 1815; Pinnotheres latreilli Leach, 1815; Pinnotheres modiolae Costa, 1840; Pinnotheres modioli Leach, 1814; Pinnotheres mytilii Leach, 1814; Pinnotheres mytilorum Leach, 1814; Pinnotheres varians Leach, 1815

= Pea crab =

Species of crab

The pea crab, Pinnotheres pisum, is a small crab in the family Pinnotheridae that lives as a parasite in oysters, clams, mussels, and other species of bivalves.

== Etymology ==
Pinnotheres is Greek for "guard of Pinna" and pisum is Latin for a pea, in reference to the shape of the crab.

== Description ==
Pea crabs are small crustaceans about the size of a pea or dime, with a "smooth dorsal surface of the carapace, or upper exoskeleton". The exoskeleton of males is hard and circular and has eyes and antennae extending from their fronts, and the chelipeds are more robust in males than in females, which have more elongated chelipeds. The bodies of the female pea crabs are often translucent and show the inner organs and gonads as yellow and red, with the males being a "more yellowish-grey with patches of brown".

== Ecology ==
The relationship between the pea crab and its host is one of parasitism, rather than commensalism, since the host may be harmed by the crab's feeding activities. The pea crab relies solely on its host for food, safety, and oxygen.

Pea crabs have a variety of hosts, the most important of which are molluscs. The pea crab lives in the mantle cavity of these hosts. Other hosts, in addition to oysters, include sea urchins and sand dollars. Pinnotheres can be found inside sand dollars, in the rectum of sea cucumbers, in the tubes of parchment worms, in the burrows of mud shrimp, or in the gills of sea squirts.

Little is known about the pea crab's feeding habits, but in the related oyster crab (Zaops ostreus), larval stages feed on plankton brought in by the oyster, while adults feed by taking the food that is a part of the oyster's diet, as well as what is not. The feeding process can be harmful to the crab's host when it feeds on the mucous strings that help carry the food to the host's mouth.

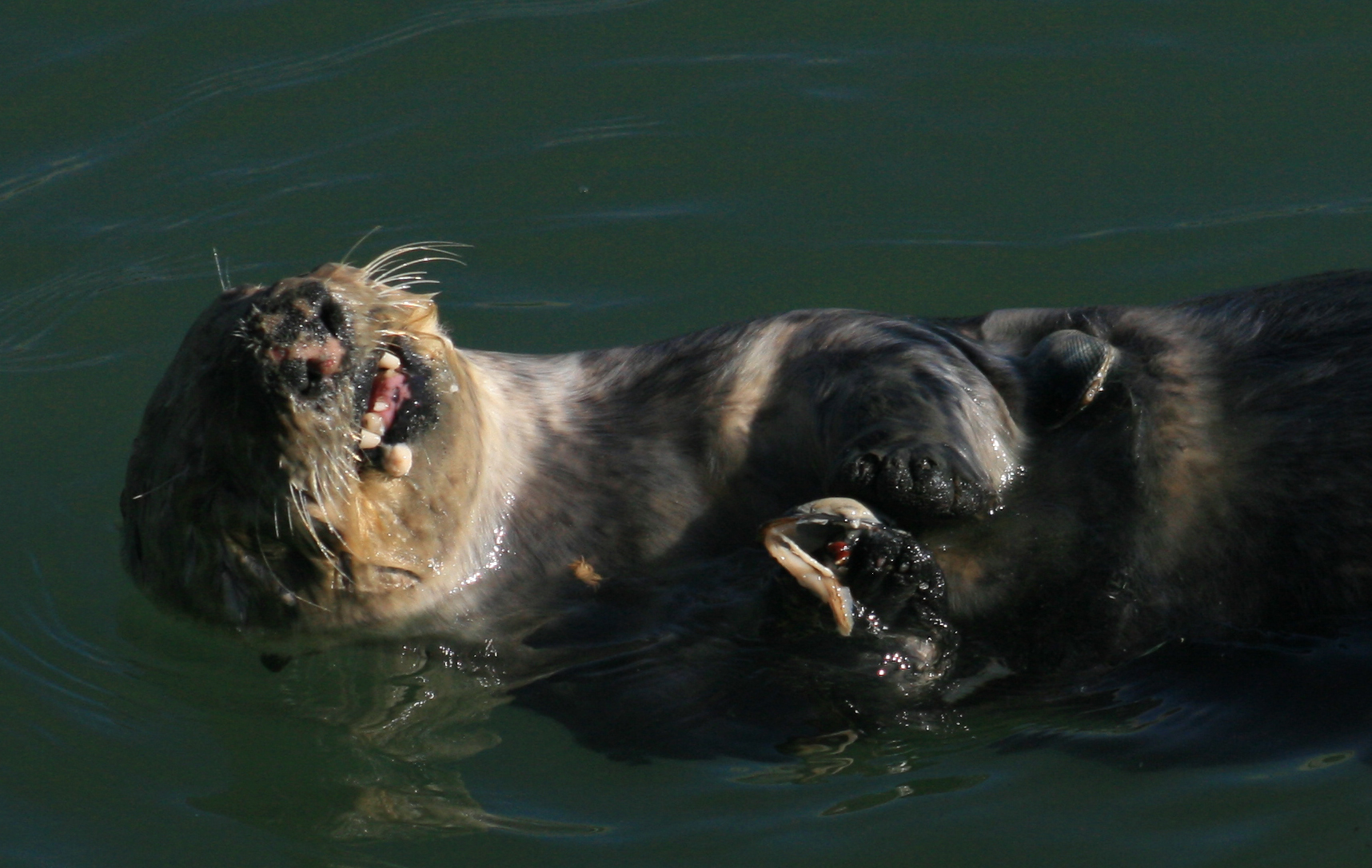
A pea crab (yellow in color) on a sea otter's neck (in Moss Landing, California)

== Mating ==
Male pea crab entering a green-lipped mussel hosting a female crab, infrared video

A male pea crab will rub the edge of a shellfish containing a female pea crab for hours until the shellfish opens and allows the male pea crab to enter.

A study by New Zealand researchers Oliver Trottier and Andrew Jeffs from the University of Auckland shows this behaviour in a similar parasitic pea crab, Nepinnotheres novaezelandiae.
