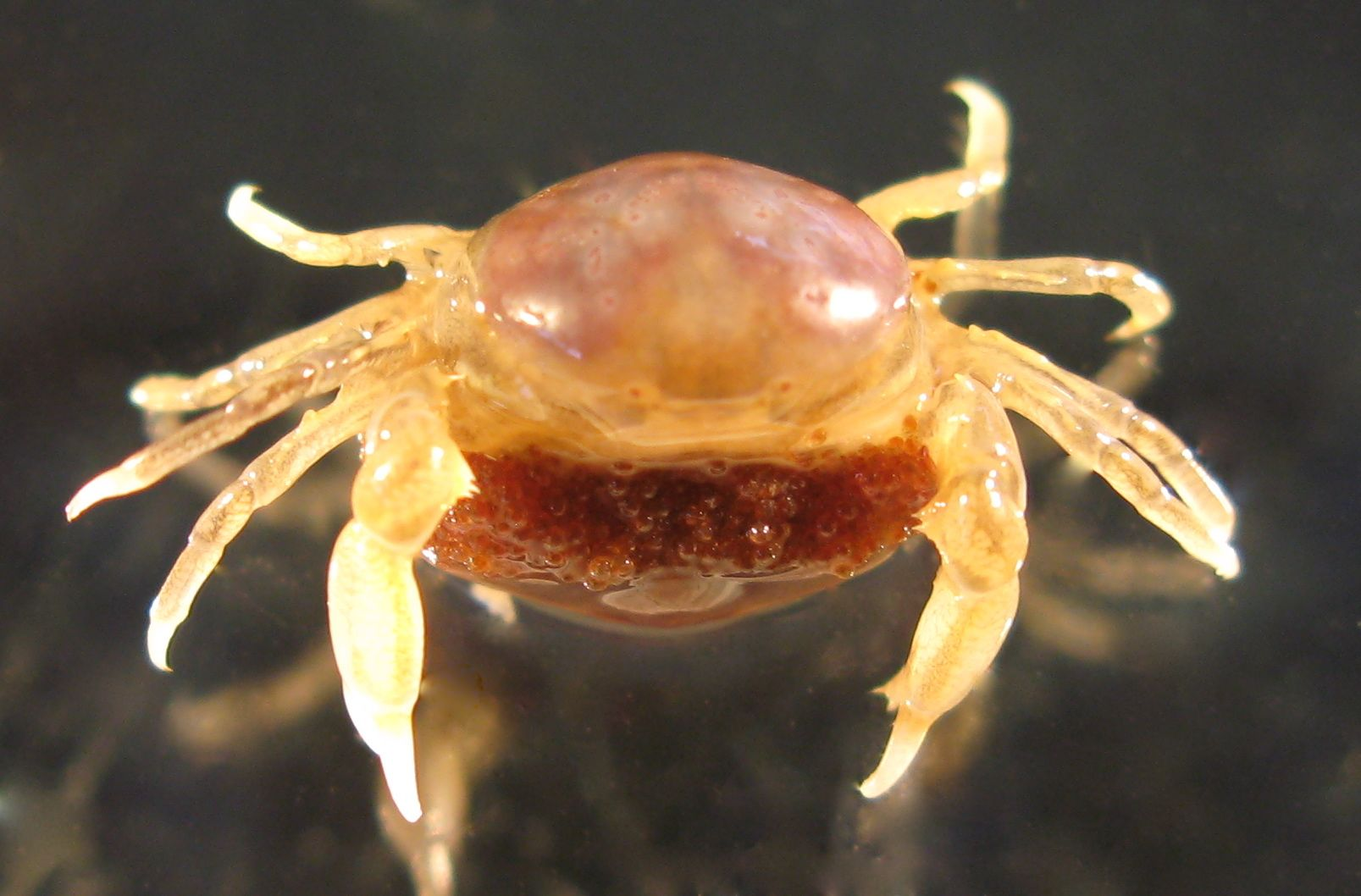
- Stage V adult female

Scientific classification
- Kingdom: Animalia
- Phylum: Arthropoda
- Clade: Pancrustacea
- Class: Malacostraca
- Order: Decapoda
- Suborder: Pleocyemata
- Infraorder: Brachyura
- Family: Pinnotheridae
- Genus: Nepinnotheres
- Species: N. novaezelandiae

Binomial name
- Nepinnotheres novaezelandiae (Filhol, 1885)

= New Zealand pea crab =

Species of crab

The New Zealand pea crab (Nepinnotheres novaezelandiae), is a species of small, parasitic crab that lives most commonly inside New Zealand green-lipped mussels. Adult females are about the size and shape of a pea, while adult males are smaller and flatter. Adult New Zealand pea crabs are completely reliant on their host mussel for shelter and food, which it steals from the mussel's gills. The New Zealand pea crab is found throughout New Zealand and can infect up to 70% of natural populations. These crabs are of concern to green-lipped mussel aquaculture because they reduce the size and growth of mussels, although infected mussels can be harvested and consumed.

== Taxonomy ==
This species was first described and named by Henri Filhol in 1885 as Pinnotheres novae-zelandiae and in 1901 as Pinnotheres schauinslandi (a junior synonym) by H. Lenz. It was later assigned to the genus Nepinnotheres.

== Description ==
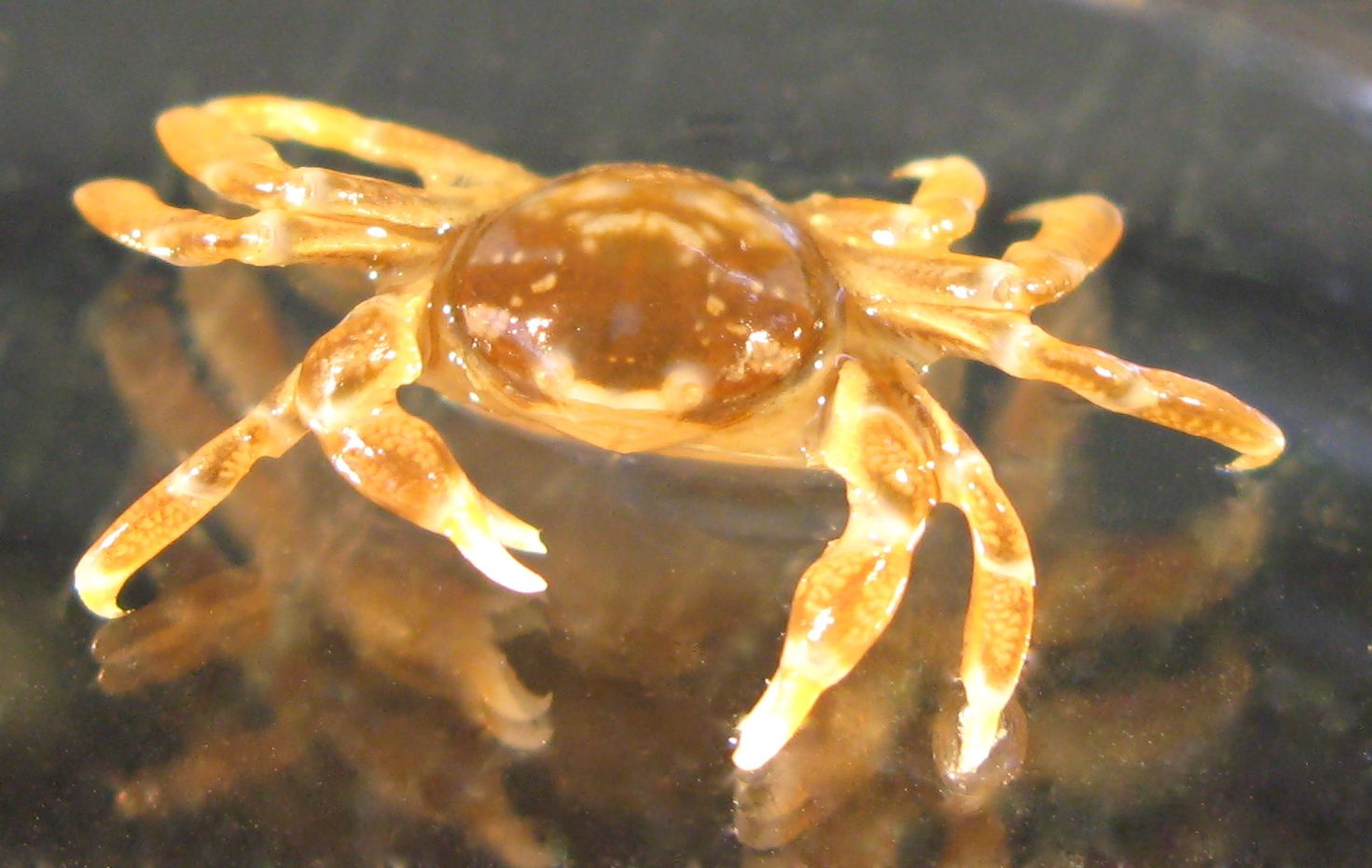
Stage I adult male Pinnotheres novaezelandiae

Adult female New Zealand pea crabs have a soft-shelled exoskeleton. Their carapace is oval in shape, ranging in size from 9.3 to 20.2 millimetres (0.37 to 0.80 in) wide. Sexually mature adult females almost always have eggs that are tucked under their abdomens, giving them a more spherical appearance. Adult females are opaque white in colour. Developing eggs change colour from red to orange to yellow before they hatch, giving the brooding mother a different tint at each stage. Adult male New Zealand pea crabs have a hard, chitinous exoskeleton. Their carapace is smaller and more dorso-ventrally flattened than that of the female, ranging in size from 3.2 to 11.8 mm (0.13 to 0.46 in) wide. Adult males are a creamy white colour with distinctive orange markings.

== Ecology ==
Female New Zealand pea crabs spend their entire adult lives within a single host. Adult males will only leave their host in order to find a mate. The hard exoskeleton and flattened body shape of the male New Zealand pea crab helps with this endeavour. New Zealand pea crabs are completely reliant on their host for food, shelter and a place to mate. The New Zealand pea crab collects food by sitting on the gills of the green-lipped mussel and stealing food strands from the mussel. The relationship between the New Zealand pea crab and the green-lipped mussel is one of parasitism because the crab damages the mussel's gills when taking food. Infected mussels are also smaller and slower growing than uninfected mussels.

The New Zealand pea crab is endemic to New Zealand and is common throughout the country, inhabiting the North Island, South Island, Stewart Island and the Chatham Islands. The New Zealand pea crab lives most commonly in green-lipped mussels (Perna canaliculus), but can also be found in many other bivalve molluscs including the blue mussel (Mytilus edulis aoteanus), the Pacific oyster (Crassostrea gigas) and a species of clam (Chione stutchburyi). The infection rate in wild green-lipped mussel populations can range from 0 to 70%.

== Behaviour ==
Male pea crab attempting to enter a mussel hosting a female crab by stroking the mantle. Infrared video

In a 2015 study, the mate location behaviour of male New Zealand pea crabs was observed when dwelling in the commercially important green-lipped mussel, Perna canaliculus. Given the cryptic behaviour of the male crabs, a novel trapping system was developed to determine whether male crabs would exit their mussel hosts in response to an upstream female crab. Observations of the nocturnal mate-finding behaviour of male crabs were made in darkness using infrared video recordings. The presence of receptive female crabs placed upstream successfully attracted 60% of male crabs from their host over 24 h. Males spent on average 49 min on empty hosts and never left a mussel containing a female conspecific once found, spending 200 min on average to gain entry to the mussel. Male crabs were often observed stroking the mantle edge of the mussel whilst attempting to gain entry, successfully increasing mussel valve gape during entry from 3.7 to 5.5 mm. The authors concluded that a pheromone-based mate location system is likely used by this crab to greatly reduce the risks associated with the location of females.

== Aquaculture ==
Mussels infected by pea crabs are edible, with the New Zealand pea crab infecting between 5.3% to 70% of natural mussel populations. These crabs are of concern to green-lipped mussel aquaculture because they reduce the size and growth of mussels by up to 29%.
