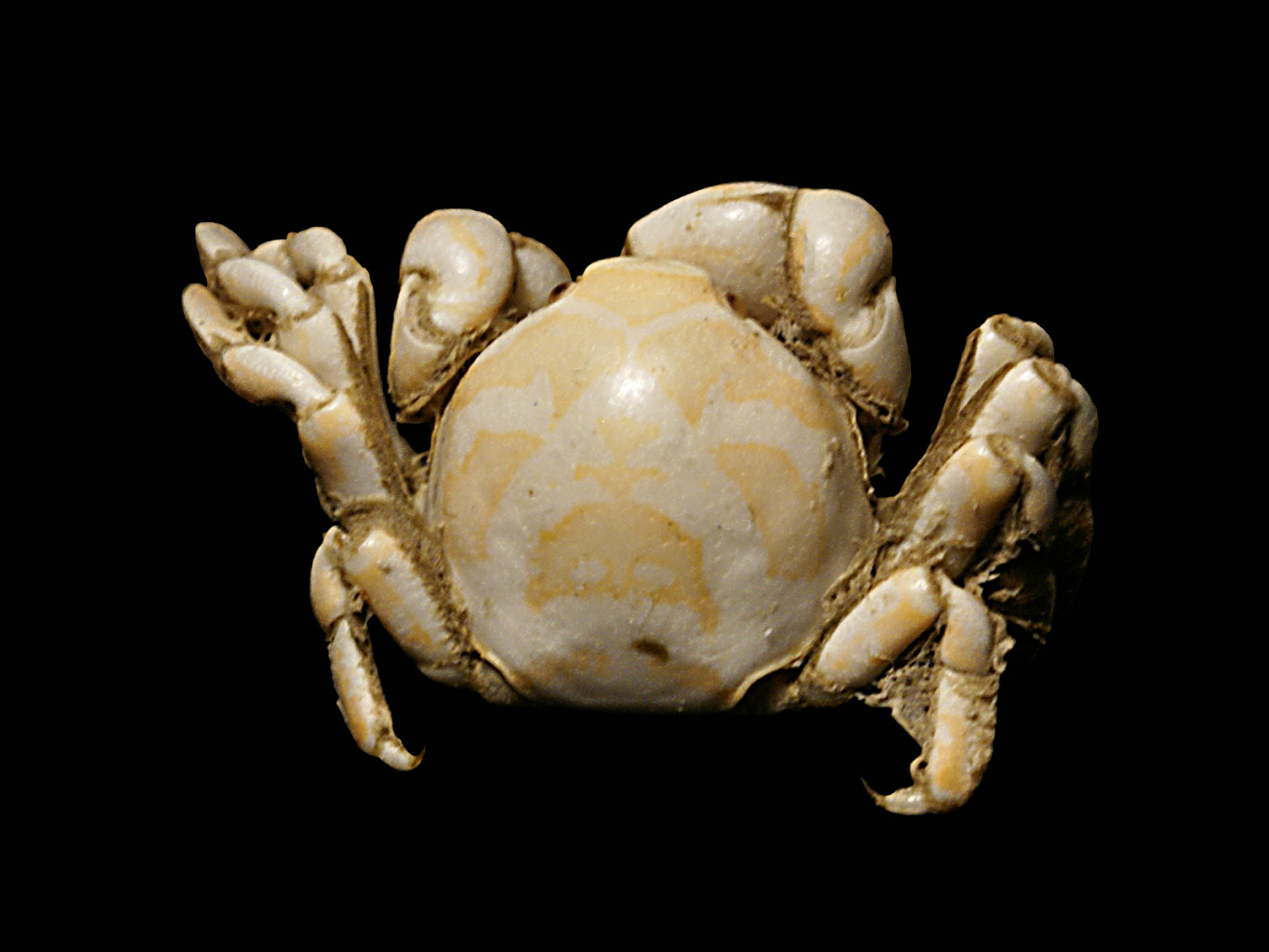
- Pinnotheres pisum

Scientific classification
- Kingdom: Animalia
- Phylum: Arthropoda
- Clade: Pancrustacea
- Class: Malacostraca
- Order: Decapoda
- Suborder: Pleocyemata
- Infraorder: Brachyura
- Subsection: Thoracotremata
- Superfamily: Pinnotheroidea
- Family: Pinnotheridae; De Haan, 1833

Genera
- See text

= Pinnotheridae =

Pinnotheridae Temporal range: Danian–Recent

Family of crabs

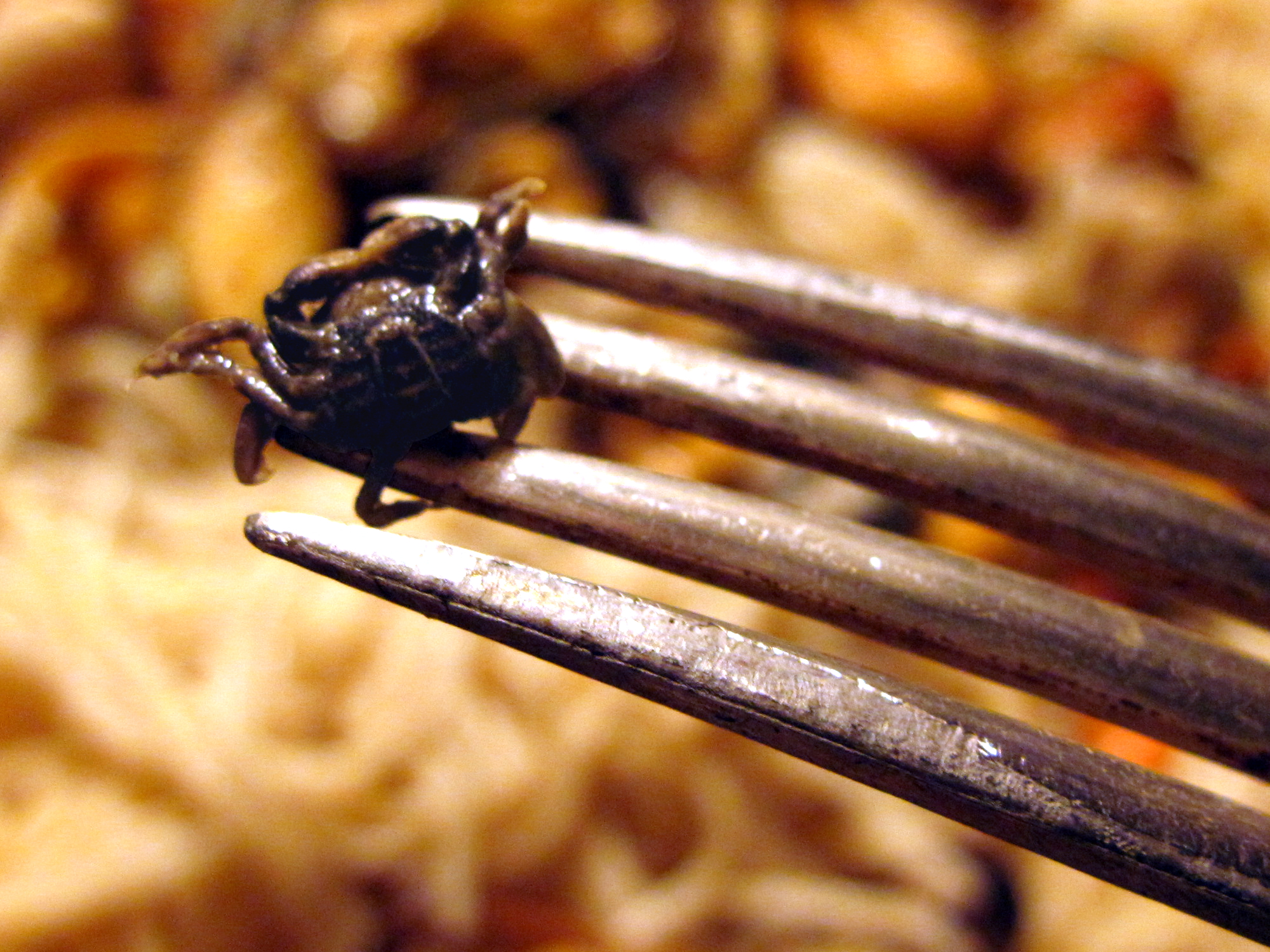
A pea crab (exact genus and species unknown) above the plate of mussels it was found in

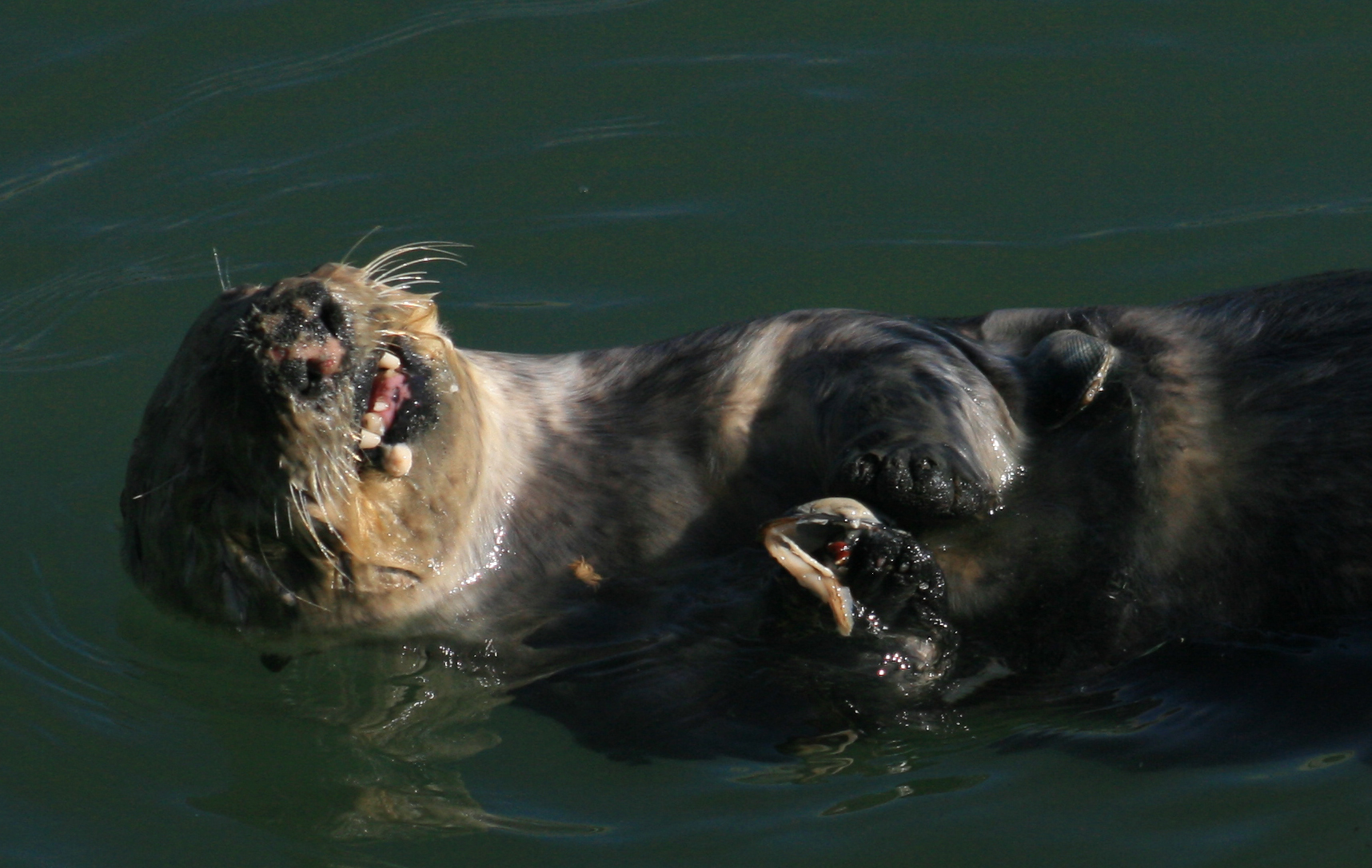
A yellow pea crab (exact genus and species unknown) has fallen out of the clam this sea otter is eating, and has landed on the sea otter's neck (in Moss Landing, California)

Pinnotheridae is a family of tiny soft-bodied crabs that live commensally in the mantles of certain bivalve molluscs and the occasional large gastropod mollusc species in genera such as Strombus and Haliotis. Tunicotheres moseri is commensal with a tunicate. The earliest fossils attributable to the Pinnotheridae date from the Danian.

== Genera ==
The following genera are recognised in the family Pinnotheridae:

- Abyssotheres Manning & Galil, 2000
- Afropinnotheres Manning, 1993
- Alain Manning, 1998
- Alainotheres Manning, 1993
- Alarconia Glassell, 1938
- Amusiotheres Ng & Ho, 2016
- Arcotheres Manning, 1993
- Austinixa Heard & Manning, 1997
- Austinotheres Campos, 2002
- Austrotheres Ahyong, 2018
- Bonita Campos, 2009
- Buergeres Ng & Manning, 2003
- Calyptraeotheres Campos, 1990
- Clypeasterophilus Campos & Griffith, 1990
- Discorsotheres Ahyong, 2018
- Dissodactylus Smith, 1870
- Durckheimia De Man, 1889
- Enigmatheres Campos, 2009
- Ernestotheres Manning, 1993
- Fabia Dana, 1851
- Gemmotheres Campos, 1996
- Glassella Campos & Wicksten, 1997
- Holotheres Ng & Manning, 2003
- Holothuriophilus Nauck, 1880
- Hospitotheres Manning, 1993
- Indopinnixa Manning & Morton, 1987
- Juxtafabia Campos, 1993
- Latatheres Ahyong, 2018
- Limotheres Holthuis, 1975
- Magnotheres Ng & Ahyong, 2022
- Mesotheres Ng, Ahyong & Campos, 2019
- Nannotheres Manning & Felder, 1996
- Nepinnotheres Manning, 1993
- Opisthopus Rathbun, 1894
- Orthotheres Sakai, 1969
- Ostracotheres H. Milne Edwards, 1853
- †Pharkidodes Feldmann, Schweitzer, Casadío & Griffin, 2011
- Pinnaxodes Heller, 1865
- Pinnixa White, 1846
- Pinnixulala Palacios Theil, Cuesta & Felder, 2016
- Pinnotheres Bosc, 1801
- Plenotheres Ng & Ahyong, 2022
- Rathbunixa Palacios Theil & Felder, 2020
- Raytheres Campos, 2004
- Sayixa Palacios Theil & Felder, 2020
- Scleroplax Rathbun, 1894
- Serenotheres Ahyong & Ng, 2005
- Sindheres Kazmi & Manning, 2003
- Solenotheres Ng & Ngo, 2010
- Tacitotheres Ng, Ahyong & Campos, 2019
- Trichobezoares Ng, 2018
- Tridacnatheres Ahyong & Ng, 2005
- Tubicolixa Palacios Theil & Felder, 2020
- Tumidotheres Campos, 1989
- Tunicotheres Campos, 1996
- Viridotheres Manning, 1996
- Visayeres Ahyong & Ng, 2007
- Waldotheres Manning, 1993
- Xanthasia White, 1846
- Zaops Rathbun, 1900
