= List of animals that produce silk =

Silk is produced by a variety of animals, for different purposes, with various types being produced.

== Insects ==
- Silkworms produce silk when undergoing larval to adult metamorphosis.
- Raspy crickets produce silk to form nests.
- Honeybee and bumblebee larvae produce silk to strengthen the wax cells in which they pupate.
- Bulldog ants spin cocoons to protect themselves during pupation.
- Weaver ants use silk to connect leaves together to make communal nests.
- Caddisfly larvae produce silk.
- Webspinners have silk glands on their front legs.
- Hornets
- Silverfish
- Mayflies
- Thrips
- Leafhoppers produce silk nests under the leaves of the trees where they live, to protect them against predators.
- Beetles
- Lacewings
- Fleas
- Flies
- Midges
- Caterpillars of many butterfly species use silk to create shelters or attach to substrates for pupation.
- Parasitic wasps such as braconids use silk cocoons for pupation.

== Other animals ==
- The family Projapygidae in the order Diplura have cerci that contain silk glands.
- The mussel Pinna nobilis creates silk to bond itself to rocks. It is used to make sea silk.
- Spiders make spider silk for various purposes such as weaving their webs, protecting their eggs or as a safety line.
- The amphipod Peramphithoe femorata uses silk to make a nest out of kelp blades. Another amphipod, Crassicorophium bonellii, use silk to build shelter.
- Carp produce fibroin units, a component of silk, to attach their eggs to rocks.
- Spider mites make webs that protects them against predators.
- Symphyla produce silk through a pair of spinnerets, which is used for nest building, escape and defense.
- Pseudoscorpions make silk chambers in which they molt.
- Goats have been genetically modified to produce milk containing extractable silk proteins.
- Dulichia rhabdoplastis
