= Ascidonia miserabilis =

Scientific classification
- Kingdom: Animalia
- Phylum: Arthropoda
- Clade: Pancrustacea
- Class: Malacostraca
- Order: Decapoda
- Suborder: Pleocyemata
- Infraorder: Caridea
- Family: Palaemonidae
- Genus: Ascidonia
- Species: A. miserabilis

Binomial name
- Ascidonia miserabilis (Holthuis, 1951)

Species of shrimp

Ascidonia miserabilis is a species of caridean shrimp (true shrimps) that belongs to the family Palaemonidae. This species can be found in the Western Atlantic Ocean and in the Caribbean Sea. Records of this species has also been reported in the Rocas Atoll, Brazil.

This genus was described in 1951 by Lipke Holthuis, a Dutch carcinologist who is often described as "the greatest carcinologist of our time", as Pontonia miserabilis. However it was superseded by Combinatio nova (Comb. nov) this its modern classification.
