= Ascidonia =

Scientific classification
- Kingdom: Animalia
- Phylum: Arthropoda
- Clade: Pancrustacea
- Class: Malacostraca
- Order: Decapoda
- Suborder: Pleocyemata
- Infraorder: Caridea
- Family: Palaemonidae
- Genus: Ascidonia; Fransen, 2002

Type species
- Pontonia flavomaculata Heller, 1864

Genus of shrimp

Ascidonia is a genus of caridean shrimp (true shrimps) that belongs to the family Palaemonidae. Members of this genus can be found in the eastern Pacific Ocean, the Caribbean Sea, the Atlantic Ocean and the Mediterranean Sea.

== Taxonomy ==
The genus was established in 2002 by Fransen with Ascidonia flavomaculata, originally Pontonia flavomaculata, being described as the type species.

=== Species ===
This genus currently contains five species. They are listed below:

1. Ascidonia californiensis (Rathbun, 1902)
2. Ascidonia flavomaculata (Heller, 1864) – Type species
3. Ascidonia miserabilis (Holthuis, 1951)
4. Ascidonia pusilla (Holthuis, 1951)
5. Ascidonia quasipusilla (Chace, 1972)

== Description ==
Members of this genus were small to medium sized. They have subcylindrical bodies with smooth carapaces and a well-developed and depressed rostrum.
