= Ascidonia californiensis =

Scientific classification
- Kingdom: Animalia
- Phylum: Arthropoda
- Clade: Pancrustacea
- Class: Malacostraca
- Order: Decapoda
- Suborder: Pleocyemata
- Infraorder: Caridea
- Family: Palaemonidae
- Genus: Ascidonia
- Species: A. californiensis

Binomial name
- Ascidonia californiensis (Rathbun, 1902)

Synonyms
- Pontonia californiensis

Species of shrimp

Ascidonia californiensis is a species of caridean shrimp (true shrimps) that belongs to the family Palaemonidae. This species can be found on the Eastern Pacific Ocean along the U.S. state of California.

This species was described in 1902 by Rathbun and it is a Combinatio nova (comb. nov). Pontonia californiensis is now a synonymised name.
