= Chiara Vigo =

Sardinian weaver specializing in sea silk

- Chiara Vigo in 2016
- Born: Chiara Vigo; 1955 (age 70–71); Calasetta, Sardinia, Italy
- Known for: Sea silk production and weaving

Chiara Vigo is a Sardinian weaver, specialized in the art of sea silk weaving, a rare form of fabric produced using byssus fibers secreted by Pinna Nobilis molluscs. She operates the Museum of Byssus, a studio and workshop in Sant'Antioco.

== Biography ==
Vigo was born in 1955 in Calasetta, Italy. In childhood she was often left in the care of her grandmother, as her mother was an obstetrician who worked long hours, and her father had died when she was 8. During this period with her grandmother she was introduced to the process of harvesting and weaving with sea silk.

Vigo is Jewish, and has used her skill to assist with historical reproductions of Jewish artifacts, including a reproduction of a garment worn by Solomon. She currently lives in Sant'Antioco with her husband, a retired coal miner.

== Sea Silk Weaving ==
Vigo harvests the material herself, which is the solidified salivary excretions of the Pinna Nobilis mollusc. This mollusc is native to the Mediterranean and is critically endangered. Because of this, measures are taken to keep the harvesting process discreet, being done in the early morning while monitored by members of the Italian Coast Guard. She then processes and dyes the silk in her studio - a haul of 250 grams of raw byssus fiber produces around 21 meters of sea silk yarn. The overall process is slow, meant to minimize harm to the mollusc, and has allowed for a total production of around 198 pieces in just over fifty years of work. For example, the reproduction of a small part of a garment measuring only 12cm by 15cm worn by the Biblical monarch Solomon involved three years of harvesting and an additional two years of weaving.

Despite her production of the silk, she asserts that she does not sell it, only offering products made with it as gifts to locals who come to her for assistance. She opened the Museum of Byssus in 2005, and produces her work there in addition to teaching and promoting the craft. Within the craft she is frequently styled Maestro or Maestro di Bisso in reference to her tenure and status as one of the last remaining practitioners of the art form.
