= Pseudamphithoides incurvaria =

Scientific classification
- Domain: Eukaryota
- Kingdom: Animalia
- Phylum: Arthropoda
- Class: Malacostraca
- Order: Amphipoda
- Family: Ampithoidae
- Genus: Pseudamphithoides
- Species: P. incurvaria

Binomial name
- Pseudamphithoides incurvaria (Just, 1977)

Synonyms
- Amphyllodomus incurvaria Just, 1977

Species of amphipod crustacean

Pseudamphithoides incurvaria is a species of amphipod crustacean in the family Ampithoidae. It is native to shallow water in the tropical western Atlantic Ocean where it creates a home for itself from fragments of the algae on which it feeds. This seaweed contains certain chemicals that are distasteful and protect it from predatory fish.

== Taxonomy ==
Two new single-species amphithoid genera were described in close succession in the mid-1970s, Pseudamphithoides Ortiz, 1976 and Amphyllodomus Just, 1977. The latter had A. incurvaria as its type, with the specific name referring to the moth genus Incurvaria, whose cocoon is built similarly to A. incurvaria's home.

Both authors noted that the genera they were describing were unusual and divergent. This was marked enough that when Karaman and Barnard later noted the synonymy of the two genera, they further added: "[we] saw specimens of the genus from Puerto Rico in 1975 and had the same difficulty initially placing the genus in a family."

== Home ==
Pseudamphithoides incurvaria lives concealed in a tube of its own construction. Two oval pieces of seaweed are bent in half longitudinally and stuck together along the long edges with a secreted glue, leaving slits open at each end. The anterior part of the animal projects at one end. The "domicile" is carried in a vertical position and the amphipod can clamber around among the hydroids and seaweed around it, and can swim while still enclosed in the casing, using strokes made by the plumose antennae.

== Distribution ==
This amphipod is found in the tropical west central Atlantic Ocean, including the Caribbean Sea. Its depth range is from the shallow subtidal zone down to about 27 m (90 ft).

== Ecology ==
A herbivore, P. incurvaria feeds exclusively on the flat-bladed brown alga Dictyota bartayresiana. This seaweed contains a diterpene alcohol that is distasteful to fish but not to the amphipod. The amphipod also uses pieces of the alga to build itself a home. Fish have been observed spitting out these casings after they have been ingested, but if the amphipod gets dislodged from the casing in the process, it is readily consumed. Researchers found that the amphipods selected D. bartayresiana to build their domicile even where it was rare, but would not use the seaweed Ulva unless there was no alternative. However, treating Ulva with pachydictyol—A, a major secondary metabolite of D. bartayresiana, made it acceptable. The study concluded that the host specificity of the amphipod was primarily driven by the need to avoid predation.

Young amphipods develop in a brood pouch and the juveniles remain inside their mother's domicile for a period of time, protected from predators and provided with easy access to their food supply.
