= Incurvaria alniella =

Scientific classification
- Kingdom: Animalia
- Phylum: Arthropoda
- Clade: Pancrustacea
- Class: Insecta
- Order: Lepidoptera
- Family: Incurvariidae
- Genus: Incurvaria
- Species: I. alniella

Binomial name
- Incurvaria alniella (Issiki, 1957)

Synonyms
- Lampronia alniella Issiki, 1957

Species of moth

Incurvaria alniella is a moth of the family Incurvariidae. It is found in Japan on the islands of Honshu and Kyushu.

The wingspan is 16-19.5 mm for males and 14–20 mm for females.

The larvae feed on Alnus japonica. They create an elliptical case consisting of two pieces of the same size. Pupation takes place within this case in spring.
