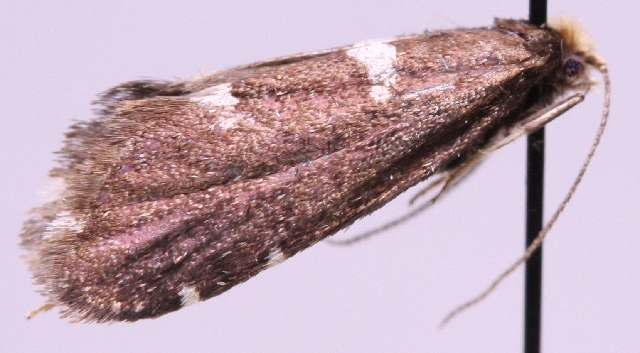

Scientific classification
- Domain: Eukaryota
- Kingdom: Animalia
- Phylum: Arthropoda
- Class: Insecta
- Order: Lepidoptera
- Family: Incurvariidae
- Genus: Incurvaria
- Species: I. circulella

Binomial name
- Incurvaria circulella (Zetterstedt, 1839)

Synonyms
- Adela circulella Zetterstedt, 1839

= Incurvaria circulella =

Species of moth

Incurvaria circulella is a moth of the family Incurvariidae. It is found in Fennoscandia and northern Russia.

The wingspan is 16–21 mm. Adults are on wing from June to mid-July.

The larvae feed on Betula nana and Betula pubescens czerepanovii. They mine the leaves of their host plant.
