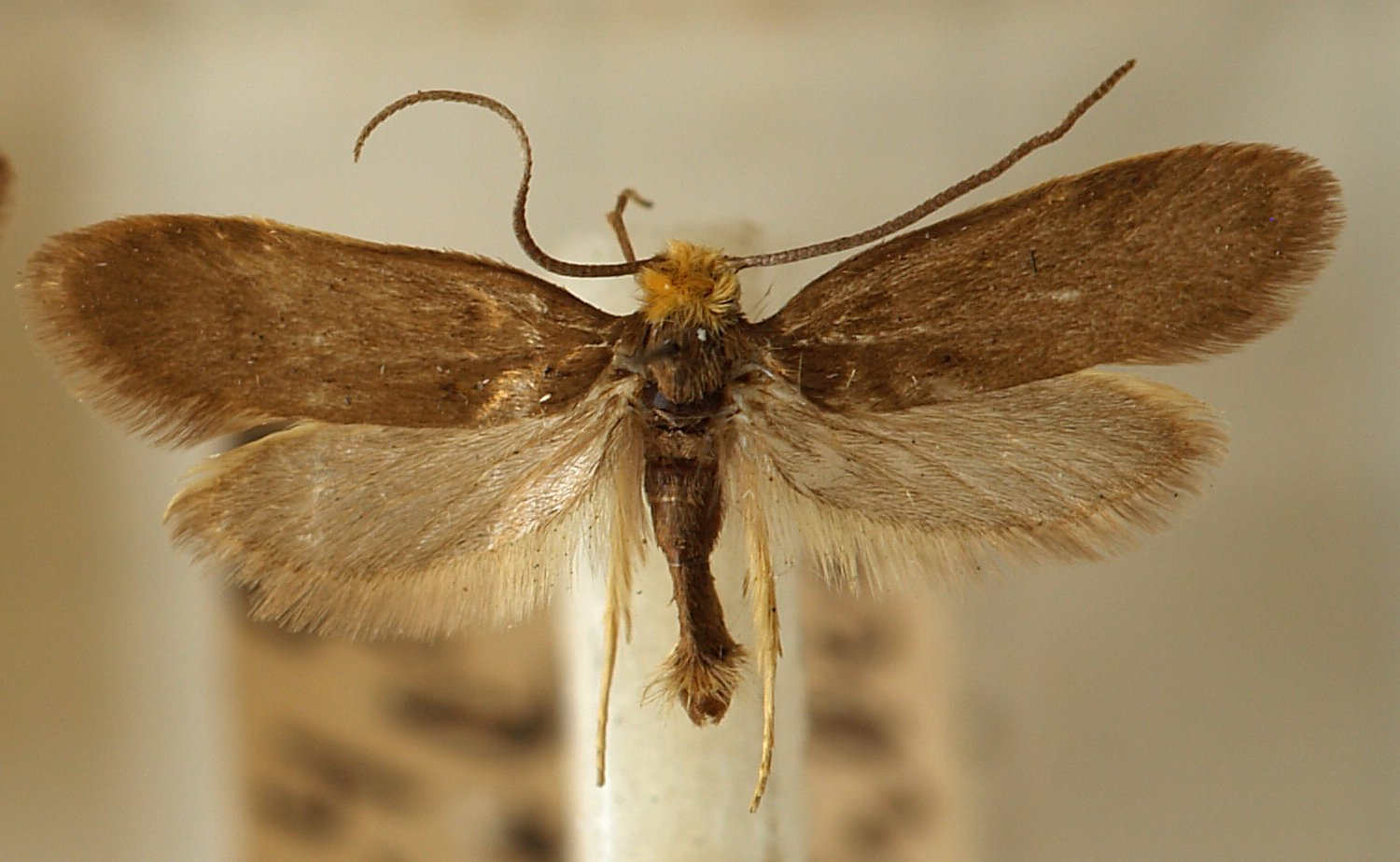

Scientific classification
- Domain: Eukaryota
- Kingdom: Animalia
- Phylum: Arthropoda
- Class: Insecta
- Order: Lepidoptera
- Family: Incurvariidae
- Genus: Incurvaria
- Species: I. koerneriella

Binomial name
- Incurvaria koerneriella (Zeller, 1839)

Synonyms
- Tinea koerneriella Zeller, 1839

= Incurvaria koerneriella =

Species of moth

Incurvaria koerneriella is a moth of the family Incurvariidae. It is found in Europe.

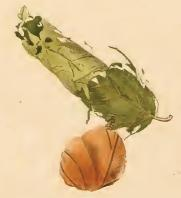
A beech leaf eaten by larva

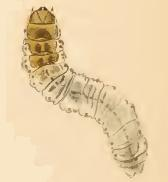
Larva

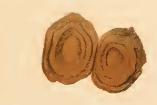
A larva case, opened to show the inside

The wingspan is 12–16 mm. The moth flies from April to May depending on the location.

The larvae feed on European beech, oak and lime.
