= Ascidonia flavomaculata =

Scientific classification
- Kingdom: Animalia
- Phylum: Arthropoda
- Clade: Pancrustacea
- Class: Malacostraca
- Order: Decapoda
- Suborder: Pleocyemata
- Infraorder: Caridea
- Family: Palaemonidae
- Genus: Ascidonia
- Species: A. flavomaculata

Binomial name
- Ascidonia flavomaculata Heller, 1864

Synonyms
- Alciope heterochelus (Rafinesque, 1814); Pontonia diazona (Joliet,1882); Pontonia elegans (Sarato,1887); Pontonia flavomaculata (Heller, 1887); Pontonia Phallusiae (Marion in Gourret, 1887); Pontonia phallusiae (Marion in de Folin & Périer, 1879)

Species of shrimp

Ascidonia flavomaculata is a small caridean shrimp from the Palaemoidae family that associates with a variety of other invertebrates like sea sponges, sea anemones, gorgonians, corals, mollusks, echinoderms, and ascidians. It is found in marine environments in mostly coastal regions.

== Description ==
Ascidonia flavomaculata is a benthic clear translucent shrimp with yellow spots and visible green internal organs that is generally associated endosymbiotically with solitary ascidians. Eye morphology in pontoniine shrimps is strongly influenced by their lifestyle, with endosymbiotic species showing reduced eye complexity compared to free-living forms. The species is gonochoric, with females having a larger abdomen and carapace than males, and males having larger claws while both sexes have one larger claw. They can range from 2–20 mm (0.079–0.787 in) long.

== Distribution and habitat ==
Ascidonia flavomaculata occurs in coastal marine environments, typically in shallow subtidal zones. They are recorded across the northeastern Atlantic as well as the broader eastern Atlantic and Mediterranean regions. They can live in a wide range of other invertebrate organisms but are most commonly found in sea squirts, specifically Phallusia mammillata. As a symbiotic crustacean, A. flavomaculata is hosted by ascidians within the branchial chamber.

== Life cycle and reproduction ==
Ascidonia flavomaculata exhibits a symbiotic lifestyle within solitary ascidian hosts, which strongly influences its reproductive biology and life cycle. A. flavomaculata prefer to live alone usually inside the branchial chambers of ascidians so for reproduction male A. flavomaculata will leave their host to go find a female. They exhibit sexual reproduction like other pontoniine shrimps and the male will stay will the female for a period of time until leaving to go back to his host. Once the female has carried the eggs for long enough in her swimmerets, they will hatch and float planktonically until they grow enough where larvae typically develop through zoeal and mysis stages before reaching juvenile form. After that, they find their own host to live in, and can often be picky about where they live and what organism they live in. They are most commonly found in Phallusia mammillata, which is a sea squirt. A. flavomaculata will occasionally leave their host to scavenge for debris and detritus.

== Taxonomy ==
Ascidonia flavomaculata comes from the genus Ascidonia and from the family Palaemonidae. The family Palaemonidae consists of a large clade of tunicate and other endosymbiotic shrimp.
