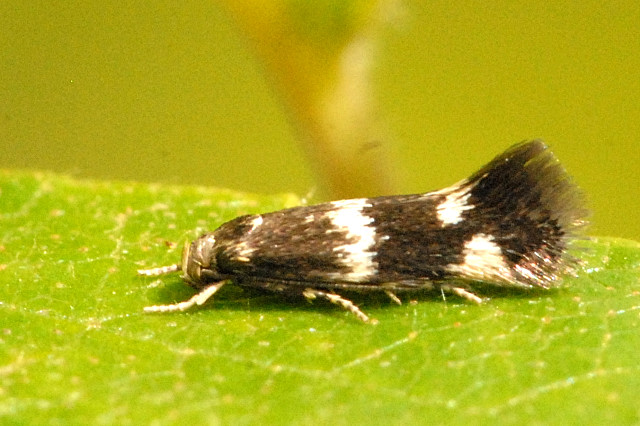

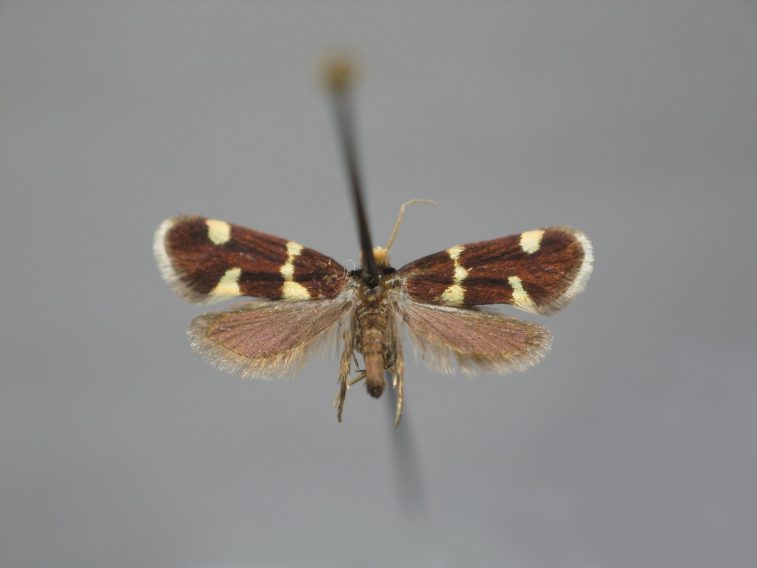

Scientific classification
- Domain: Eukaryota
- Kingdom: Animalia
- Phylum: Arthropoda
- Class: Insecta
- Order: Lepidoptera
- Family: Incurvariidae
- Genus: Incurvaria
- Species: I. praelatella

Binomial name
- Incurvaria praelatella (Denis & Schiffermüller, 1775)

Synonyms
- Tinea praelatella Denis & Schiffermuller, 1775; Lampronia praelatella

= Incurvaria praelatella =

Species of moth

Incurvaria praelatella is a moth of the family Incurvariidae. It is found in all of Europe, except the Iberian Peninsula.

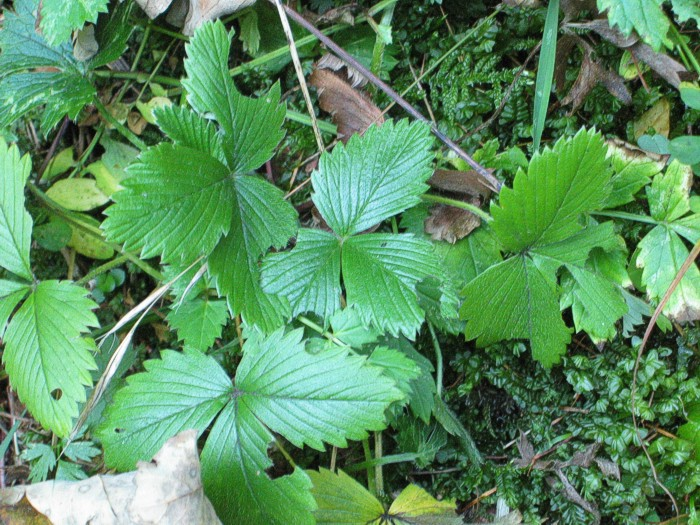
Feeding damage

The wingspan is 11–14 mm.Head light yellow ochreous. Forewings dark fuscous, purplish-tinged; a basal dot, a sometimes interrupted fascia at 1/3, a triangular dorsal spot before tornus, and a larger costal spot beyond it pale ochreous -yellowish; tips of apical cilia white. Hindwings rather dark bronzy-grey.

The larvae feed on Achillea, Agrimonia, Alchemilla vulgaris, Filipendula, Fragaria vesca, Geum rivale, Potentilla reptans, Rubus fruticosus and Spiraea douglasii. They mine the leaves of their host plant.
