= Incurvaria triglavensis =

Scientific classification
- Kingdom: Animalia
- Phylum: Arthropoda
- Class: Insecta
- Order: Lepidoptera
- Family: Incurvariidae
- Genus: Incurvaria
- Species: I. triglavensis

Binomial name
- Incurvaria triglavensis Hauder, 1912

Species of moth

Incurvaria triglavensis is a moth of the family Incurvariidae. It is found in Italy, Austria, Slovenia, Bosnia and Herzegovina and possibly a larger area of the Balkan Peninsula.
