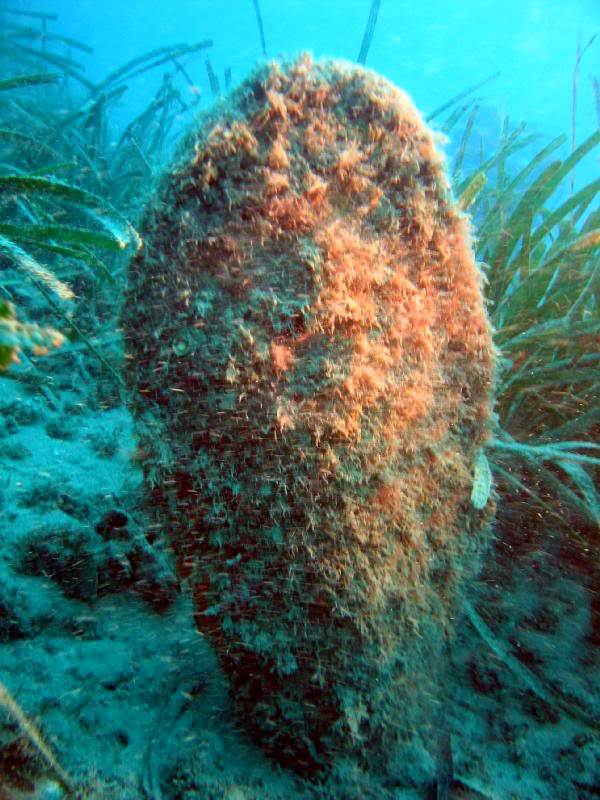
- Live specimen of Pinna nobilis, in Levanto, Liguria (Italy)

Conservation status
- Critically Endangered (IUCN 3.1)

Scientific classification
- Kingdom: Animalia
- Phylum: Mollusca
- Class: Bivalvia
- Order: Pteriida
- Superfamily: Pinnoidea
- Family: Pinnidae
- Genus: Pinna
- Species: P. nobilis

Binomial name
- Pinna nobilis (Linnaeus, 1758)

Synonyms
- Pinna (Pinna) nobilis Linnaeus, 1758· accepted, alternate representation; Pinna aculeatosquamosa Martens, 1866; Pinna cornuformis Nardo, 1847; Pinna ensiformis Monterosato, 1884; Pinna gigas Röding, 1798; Pinna gigas Chemnitz; Pinna incurvata Born, 1778; Pinna nigella Gregorio, 1885; Pinna nobilis var. aequilatera Weinkauff, 1867; Pinna nobilis var. dilatata Pallary, 1906; Pinna nobilis var. gangisa de Gregorio, 1885; Pinna nobilis var. inaequilatera Weinkauff, 1867; Pinna nobilis var. intermilla de Gregorio, 1885; Pinna nobilis var. latella de Gregorio, 1885; Pinna nobilis var. maga de Gregorio, 1885; Pinna nobilis var. nana Pallary, 1919; Pinna nobilis var. pisciformis de Gregorio, 1885; Pinna nobilis var. polii Bucquoy, Dautzenberg & Dollfus, 1890; Pinna nobilis var. rarisquama Bucquoy, Dautzenberg & Dollfus, 1890; Pinna obeliscus Martens, 1866; Pinna saccata Poli, 1795 (invalid: junior homonym of Pinna saccata Linnaeus, 1758; Pinna ensiformis Monterosato, 1884 is a replacement name); Pinna squammosa Requien, 1848; Pinna squamosa Gmelin, 1791; Pinna vulgaris Roissy, 1804

= Pinna nobilis =

Species of bivalve

Pinna nobilis, known by the common names noble pen shell and fan mussel, is a large species of Mediterranean clam, a marine bivalve mollusc in the family Pinnidae, the pen shells.

It reaches up to 120 cm (4 ft) of shell length. It produces a rare manganese-containing porphyrin protein known as pinnaglobin.

== Description ==
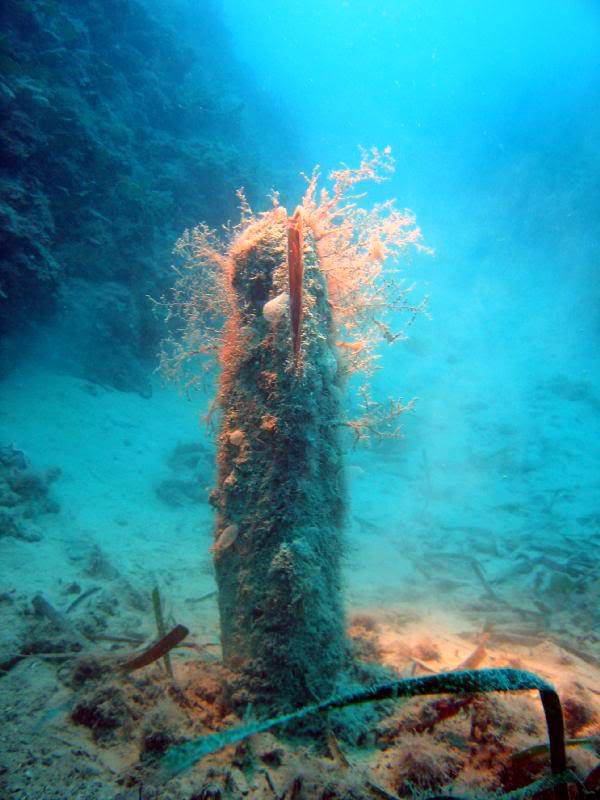
Live specimen of Pinna nobilis, in Levanto, Liguria

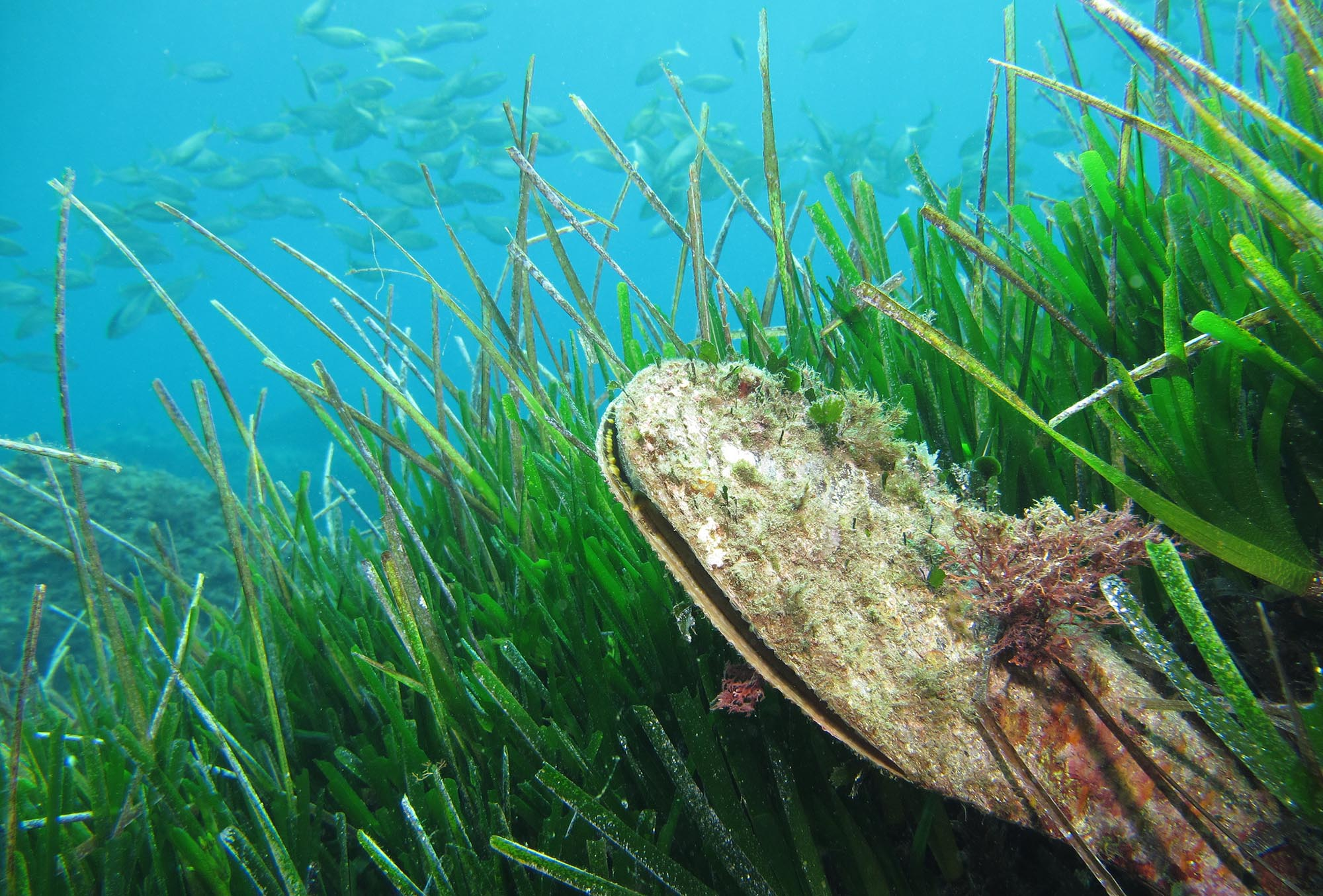
Pinna nobilis in a Mediterranean seagrass meadow

The bivalve shell is usually 30–50 cm (12–20 in) long, but can reach 120 cm (4 ft). Its shape differs depending on the region it inhabits. Like all pen shells, it is relatively fragile to pollution and shell damage. It attaches itself to rocks using a strong byssus composed of many silk-like threads which used to be made into cloth. The animal secretes these fibres from its byssus gland; they consist of keratin and other proteins and may be as long as 6 cm (2 1/2 in). The inside of the shell is lined with brilliant mother-of-pearl. As with other members of its genus, Pinna nobilis hosts symbiotic crustaceans which live inside its shell; in this case it is the shrimp Pontonia pinnophylax and the pea crab Nepinnotheres pinnotheres. It is believed that when it sees a threat, the shrimp warns the host, perhaps by retracting its claws or even by pinching. The clam then closes shut. It has been demonstrated that the shrimp has a similar filter-feeding diet to its host, and the relationship is likely mutualistic.

Right and left valve of the same specimen:

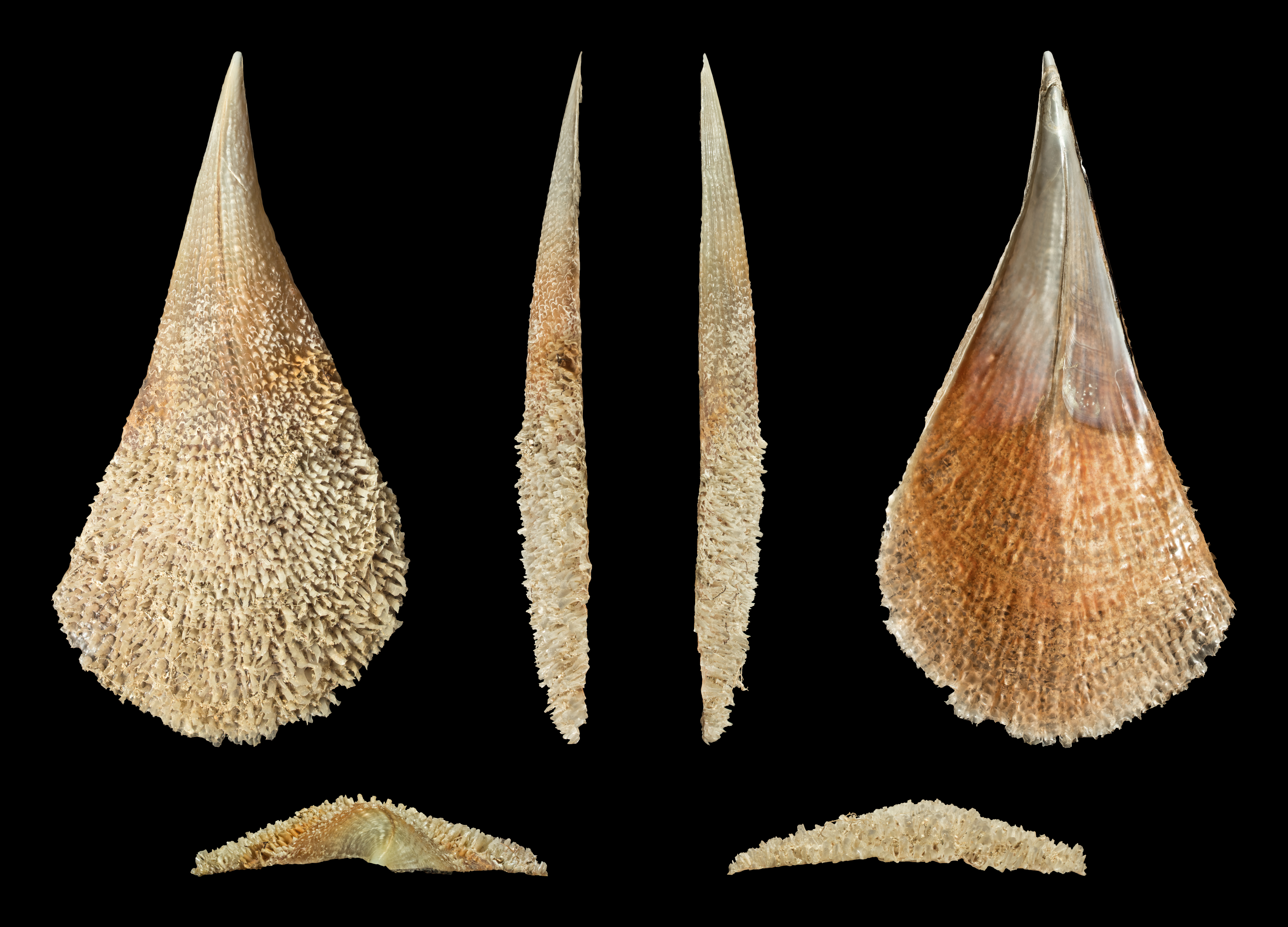
Right valve

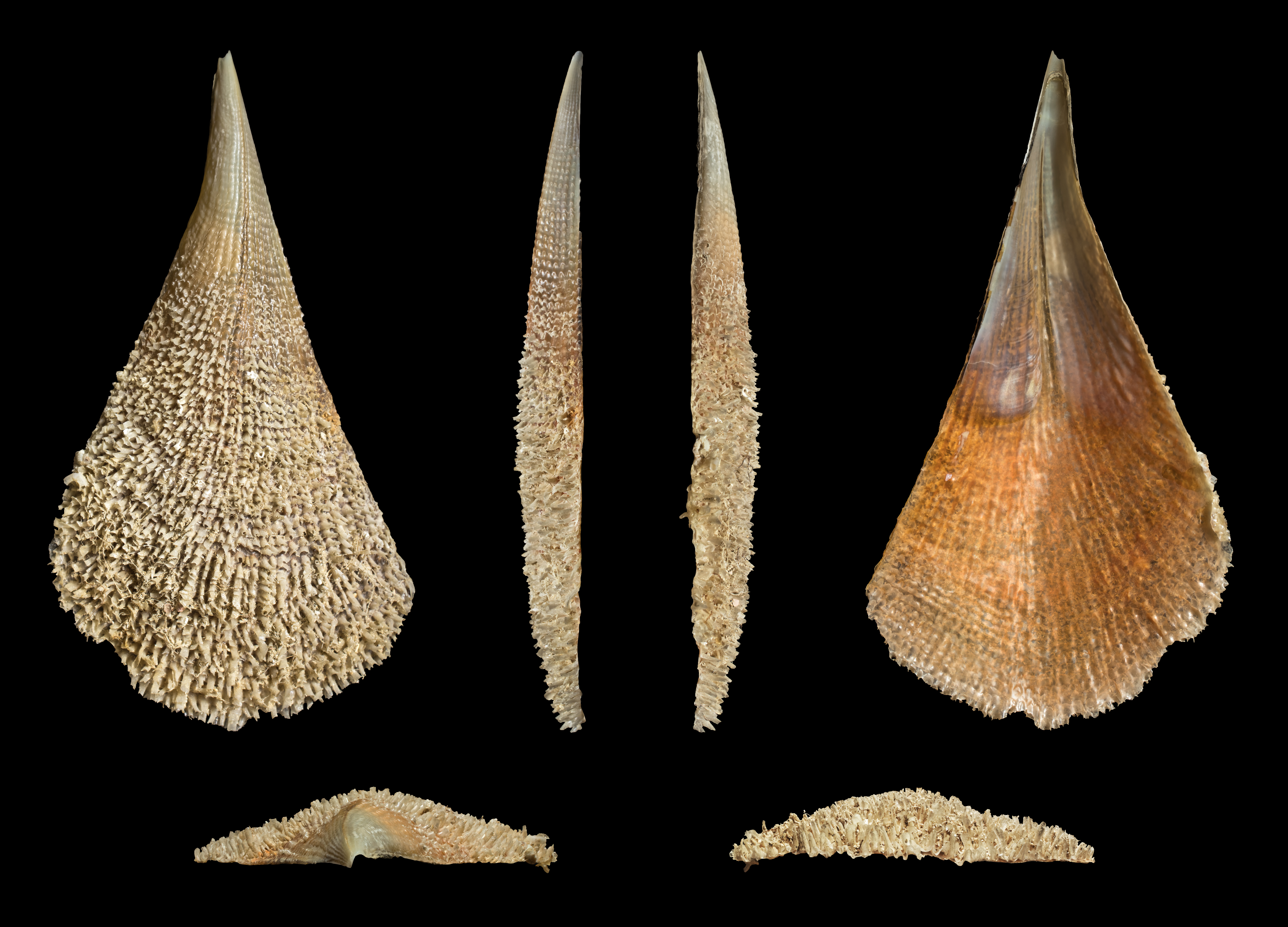
Left valve

== Distribution ==
This species is endemic to the Mediterranean Sea, where it lives offshore at depths ranging between 0.5 and 60 m (2 and 200 ft). It could be found buried beneath soft-sediment areas (fine sand, mud, often anoxic).

== Human relevance ==
This species is the origin of sea silk, which was made from the byssus of the animal.

== Threats ==
In 2016, an outbreak of one disease caused the mortality of 99% of its population in Spain. The cause of the disease was a newly discovered pathogen, Haplosporidium pinnae, which still poses a serious threat to the survival of the species. By 2019, mortality spots had been detected in Greece, Croatia, Turkey, Tunisia, France and Morocco. In the Trieste area, considerable efforts have also been made to conserve the deposits since 2020. In the past, Pinna nobilis faced extinction, due in part to fishing, incidental killing by trawling and anchoring, and the decline in seagrass fields; pollution kills eggs, larvae, and adult mussels. Such threats, however, have been very localised and have not led to such a widespread and rapid population decline. The pathogen, which is still present in the environment, will make recovery a challenge, so continuing declines are expected. The percentage of population size reduction over the last ten years is over 80%. In December 2019, Pinna nobilis has entered the IUCN Red List as critically endangered.

The noble pen shell has been listed as an endangered species in the Mediterranean Sea. The European Council Habitats Directive 92/43/EEC, on conservation of natural habitats and the wild fauna and flora, proclaims that P. nobilis is strictly protected (by the Annex IV of EEC, 1992) – all forms of deliberate capture or killing of fan mussel specimens are prohibited by law.

As part of the Costa Concordia disaster recovery effort in Italy in 2012, a group of about 200 Pinna nobilis was relocated to a nearby area due to the threat posed by subsequent engineering work.

The byssus of Atrina pectinata, a shell of the same family, has been used in Sardinia as a substitute for Pinna nobilis, to weave sea silk.

== Protection ==
Pinna nobilis is sensitive to exceptional pollution. Many die due to anchoring; additionally, illegal extraction, which has been prohibited in Croatia since 1977, is still present. It has been placed on the list of strictly protected species in Croatia. Any extraction of P. nobilis out of the sea is heavily fined.

== Gallery ==
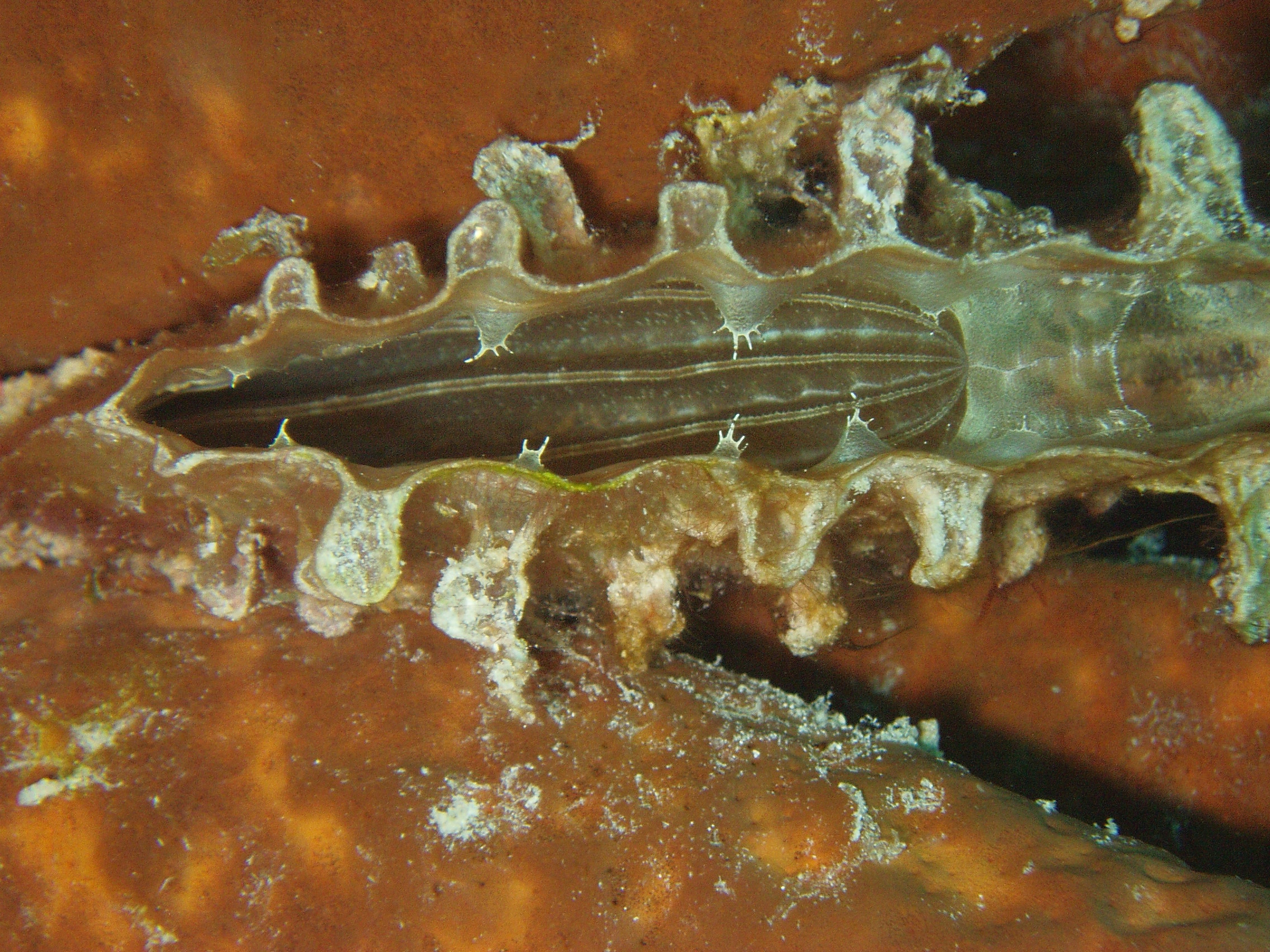
Live specimen of P. nobilis, looking into the shell from above

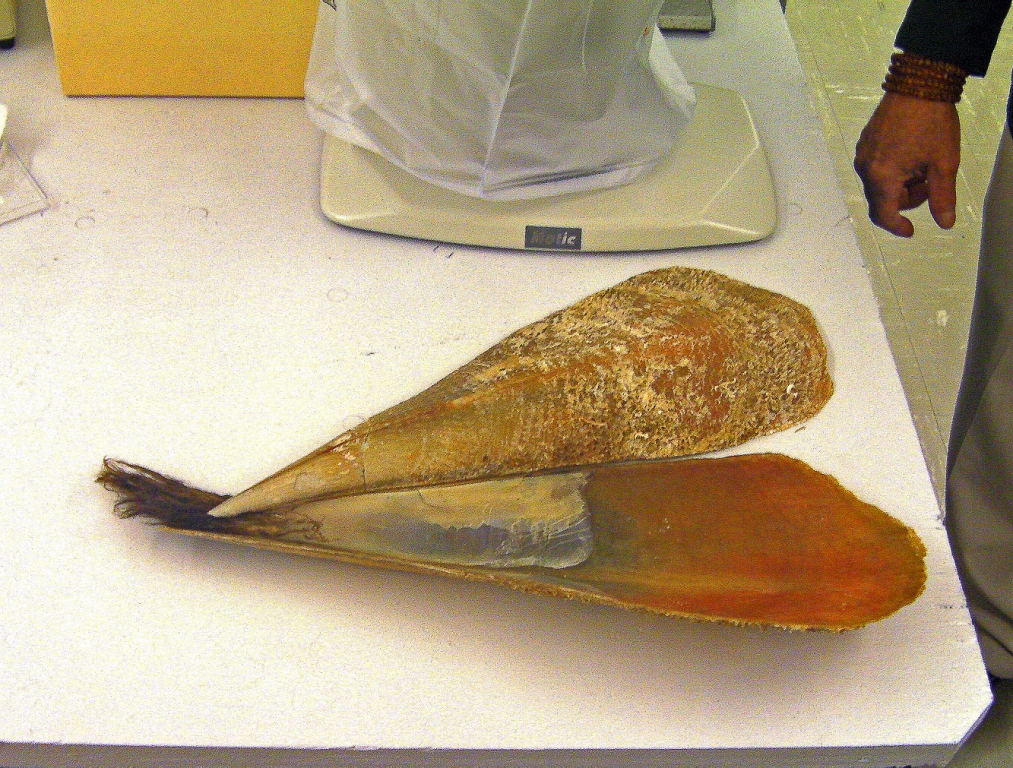
Pinna nobilis: shell and byssus

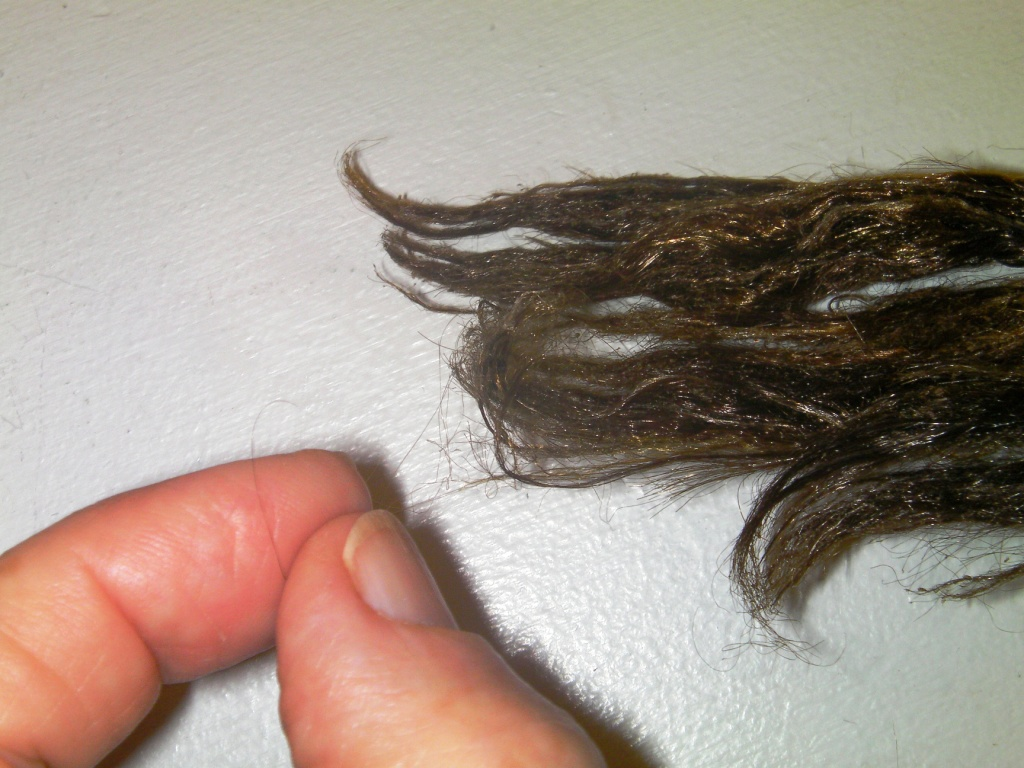
The very fine byssus threads of P. nobilis

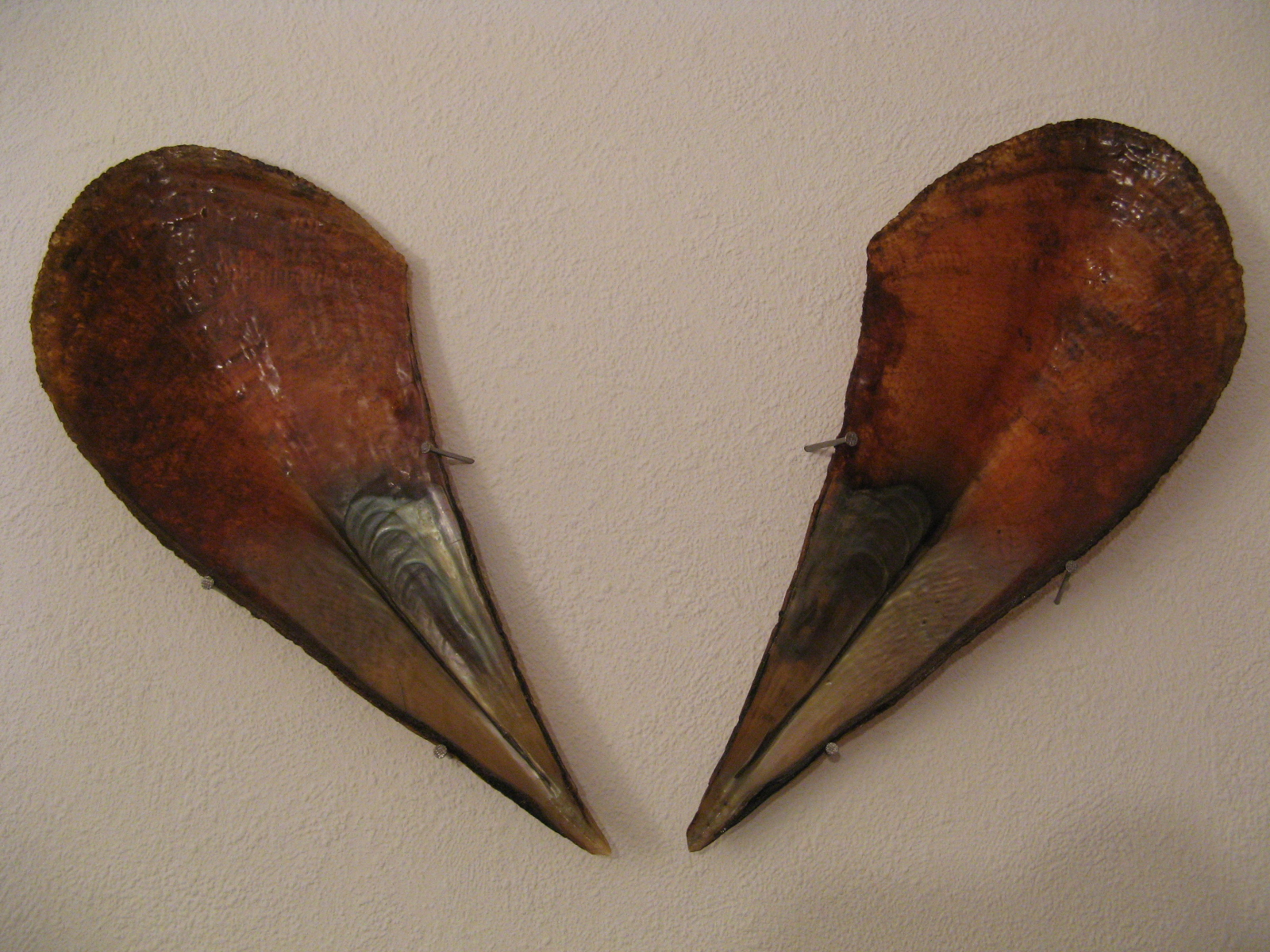
Shell of Pinna nobilis

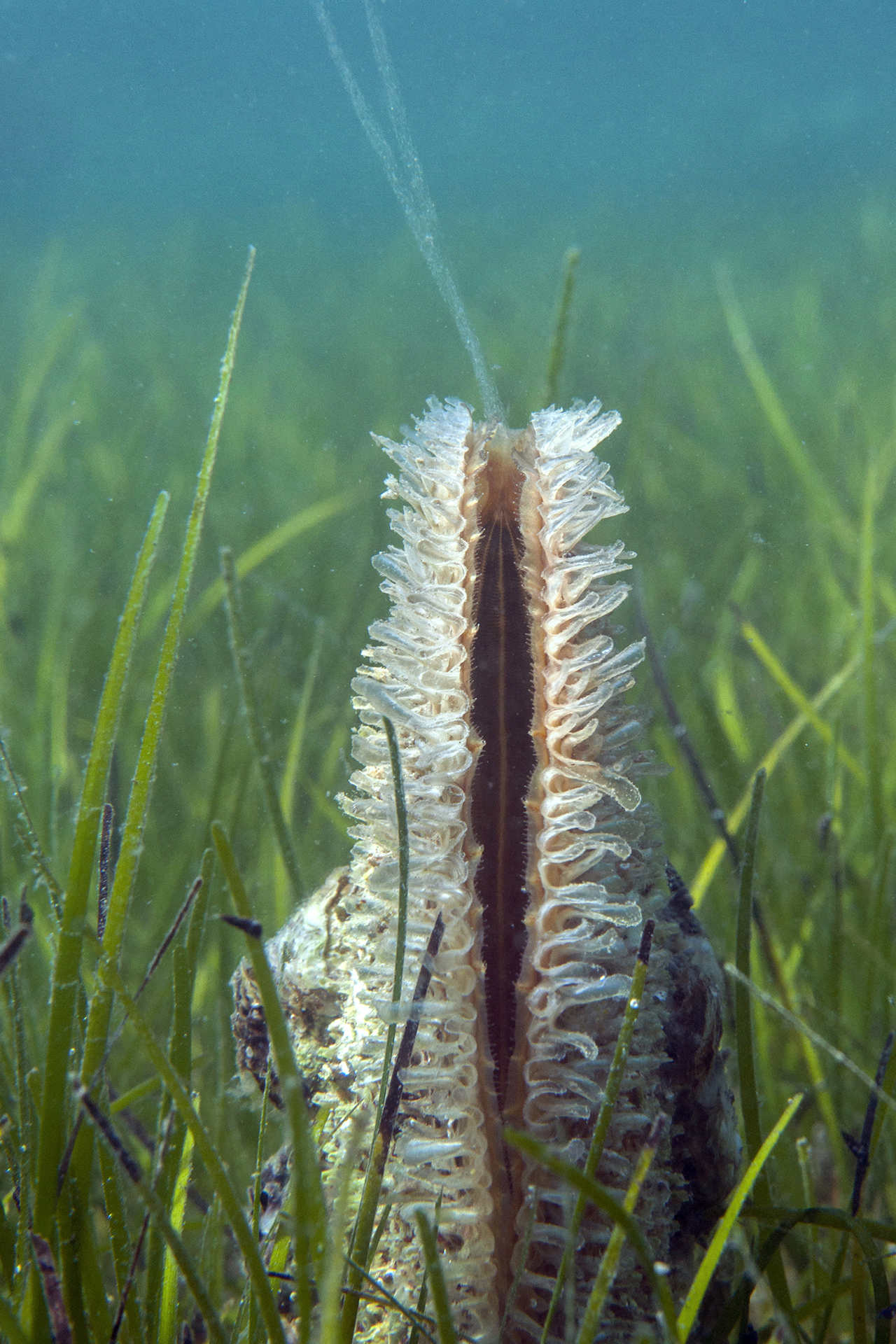
Releasing male gametes, Pula, Croatia

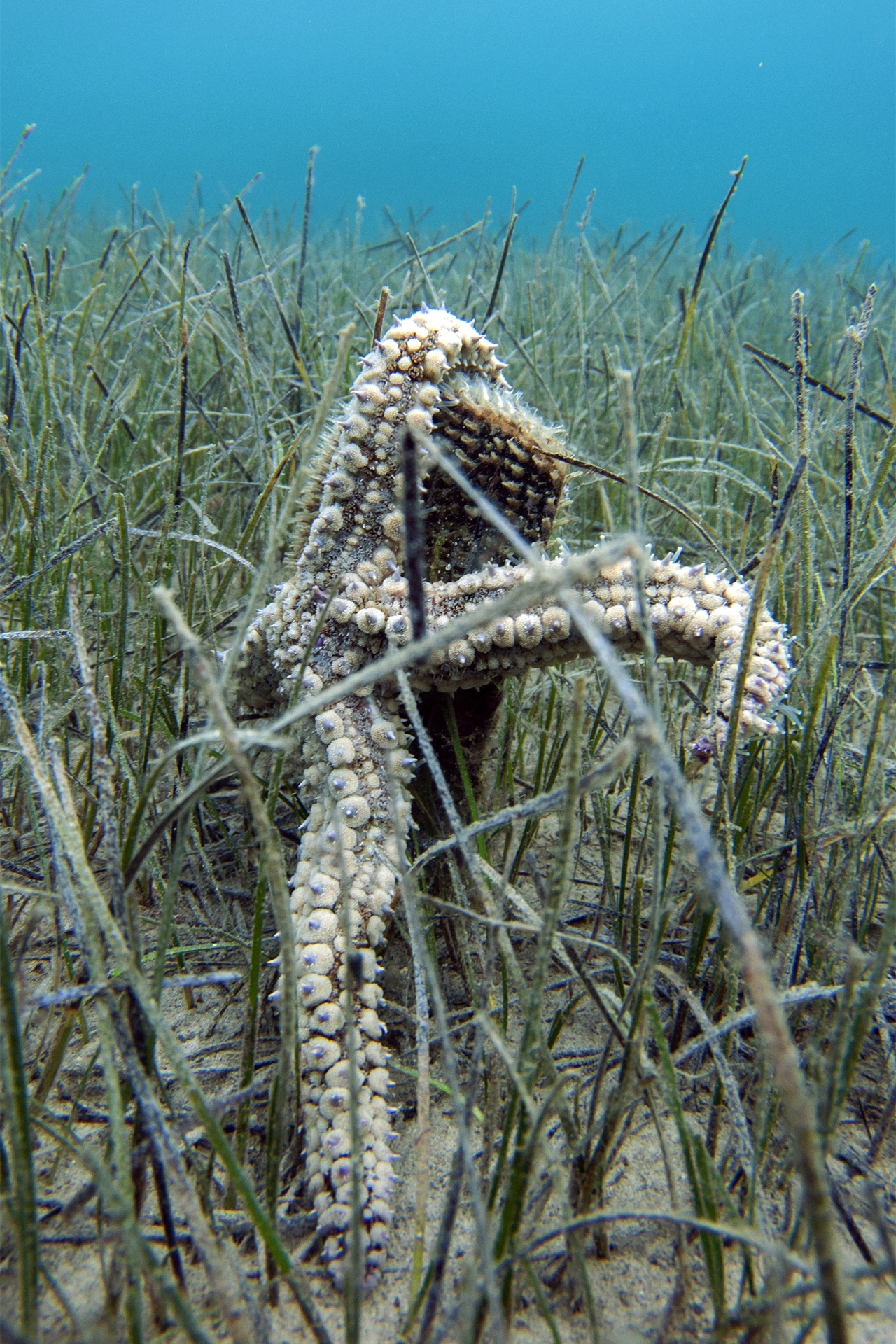
Marthasterias glacialis attack, Pula, Croatia

== See also ==
- List of animals that produce silk
