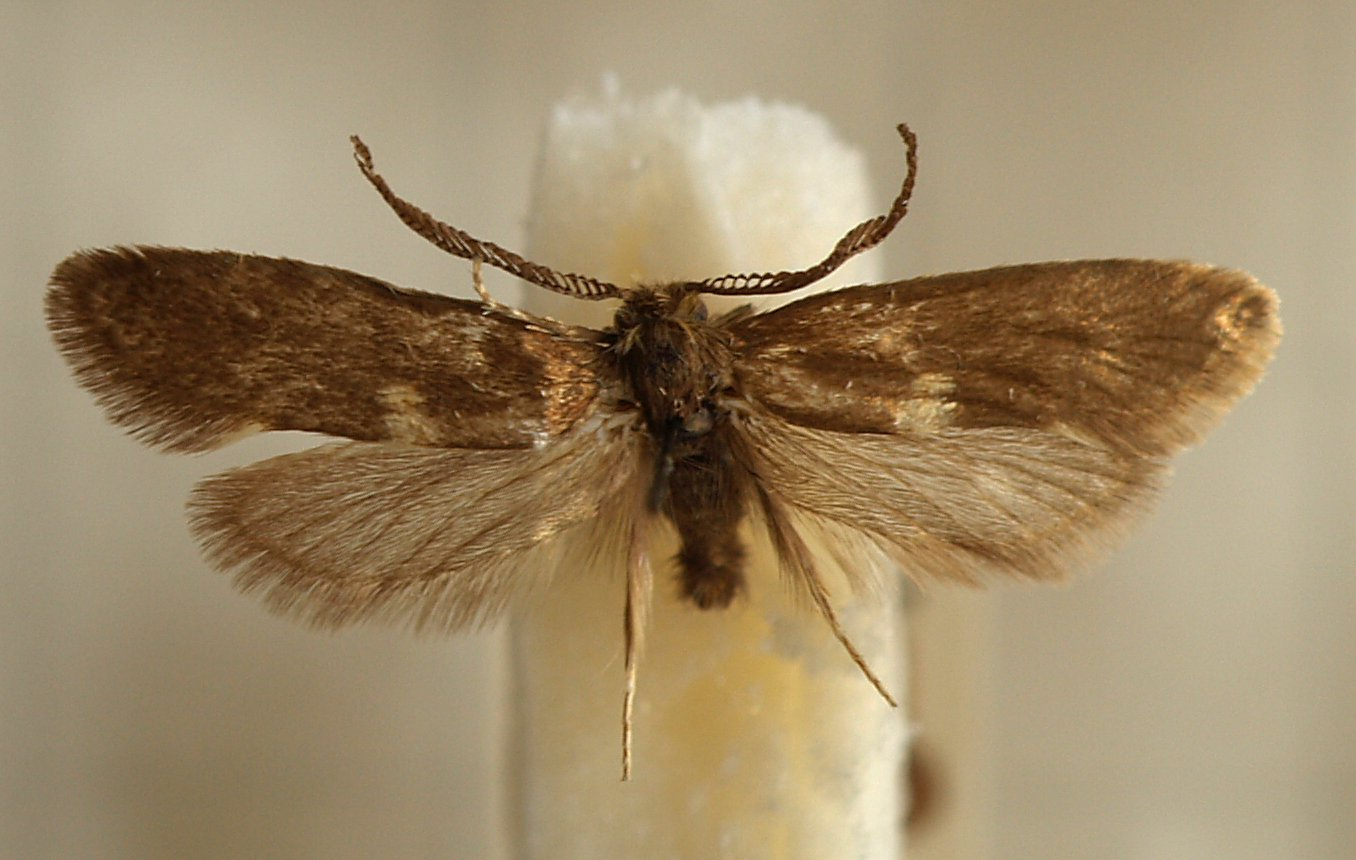

Scientific classification
- Domain: Eukaryota
- Kingdom: Animalia
- Phylum: Arthropoda
- Class: Insecta
- Order: Lepidoptera
- Family: Incurvariidae
- Genus: Incurvaria
- Species: I. pectinea

Binomial name
- Incurvaria pectinea Haworth, 1828

Synonyms
- Tinea zinckenii Zeller, 1839

= Incurvaria pectinea =

Species of moth

Incurvaria pectinea is a moth of the family Incurvariidae. It is found in Europe.

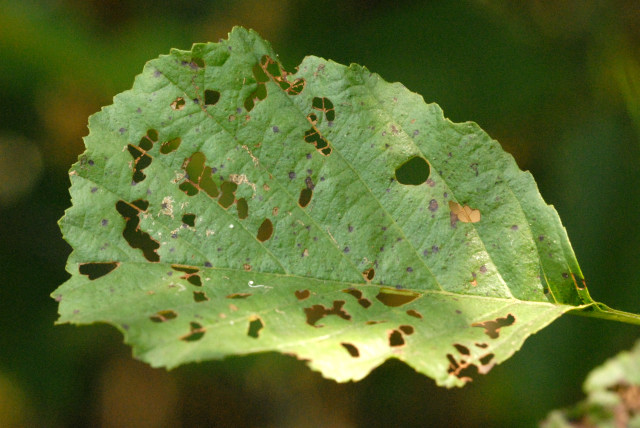
Damage

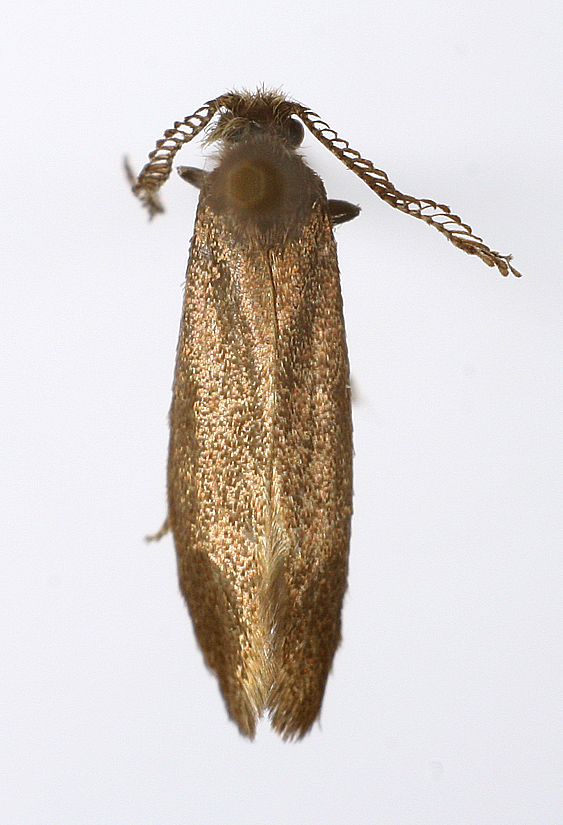

A medium-sized (wingspan 13 – 16 mm), brownish moth. It may resemble several of the other Incurvaria species, but differs from these in that the wings are somewhat narrower, the colour paler and the pale spots at the trailing edge of the forewing less distinct. The male has comb-shaped antennae that are about 2/3 as long as the forewing, the female's antennae are filamentous with protruding hairs and about half as long as the forewing. The head is covered with long, erect, yellowish hair-like scales, and appears rather disheveled. The forewing is rather narrow, pale greyish-brown in colour. At the hind edge it has two light spots, these are not very conspicuous, less evident than in other Incurvaria species. The innermost spot is usually larger than the outermost. Sometimes the spots may be completely missing. The hindwing is greyish-brown with long, greyish-brown hairy fringes. The larva is whitish with a yellowish-brown head and greyish-brown dorsal plates on the three leading body joints. Meyrick describes it - Head pale greyish-ochreous. Forewings shining prismatic fuscous; a yellow-whitish dorsal spot before middle, and an indistinct dot before tornus. Hindwings brassy-grey.

The moth flies from April to May depending on the location.

The larvae feed on various deciduous trees, such as birch, hazel and apple.he species can be found almost everywhere where deciduous trees grow. The larvae develop in the leaves. The female lays several eggs on each leaf. The larva begins by creating a small, round spot mine. It then gnaws its way out, makes a casing of leaves and silk, and lowers itself to the ground, where it spends the rest of the larval period and feeds on fallen leaves. The infested leaves may be severely pierced after the larvae have left them. The adult moths fly from late April to early June.
