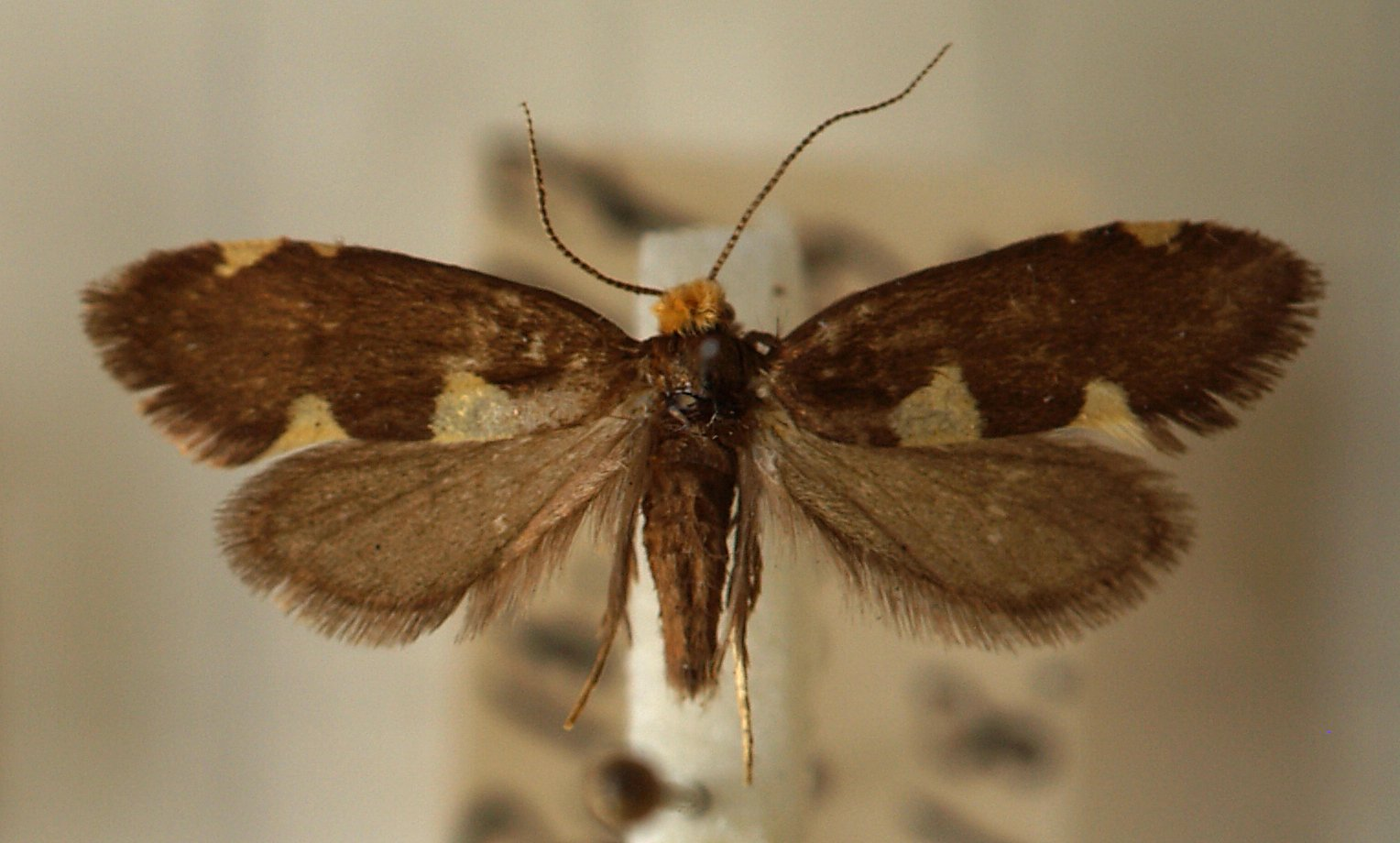

Scientific classification
- Domain: Eukaryota
- Kingdom: Animalia
- Phylum: Arthropoda
- Class: Insecta
- Order: Lepidoptera
- Family: Incurvariidae
- Genus: Incurvaria
- Species: I. oehlmanniella

Binomial name
- Incurvaria oehlmanniella (Hübner, 1796)

Synonyms
- Tinea oehlmanniella Hübner, 1796

= Incurvaria oehlmanniella =

Species of moth

Incurvaria oehlmanniella is a moth of the family Incurvariidae. It is found in Europe and across the Palearctic to eastern Siberia.

Its wingspan is 12–16 mm. The head is deep ochreous yellow. The forewings are dark bronzy-fuscous, mixed with purplish with a subtriangular dorsal spot before middle, a smaller one before the tornus, and a third sometimes nearly obsolete on costa at 3/4 pale yellowish. Hindwings rather dark purplish-grey.

It flies from April to July, depending on the location.

The larvae feed on bilberry, cloudberry, Cornus (syn. Swida) and Prunus.
