= Byssus =

Fibre secreted by some molluscs

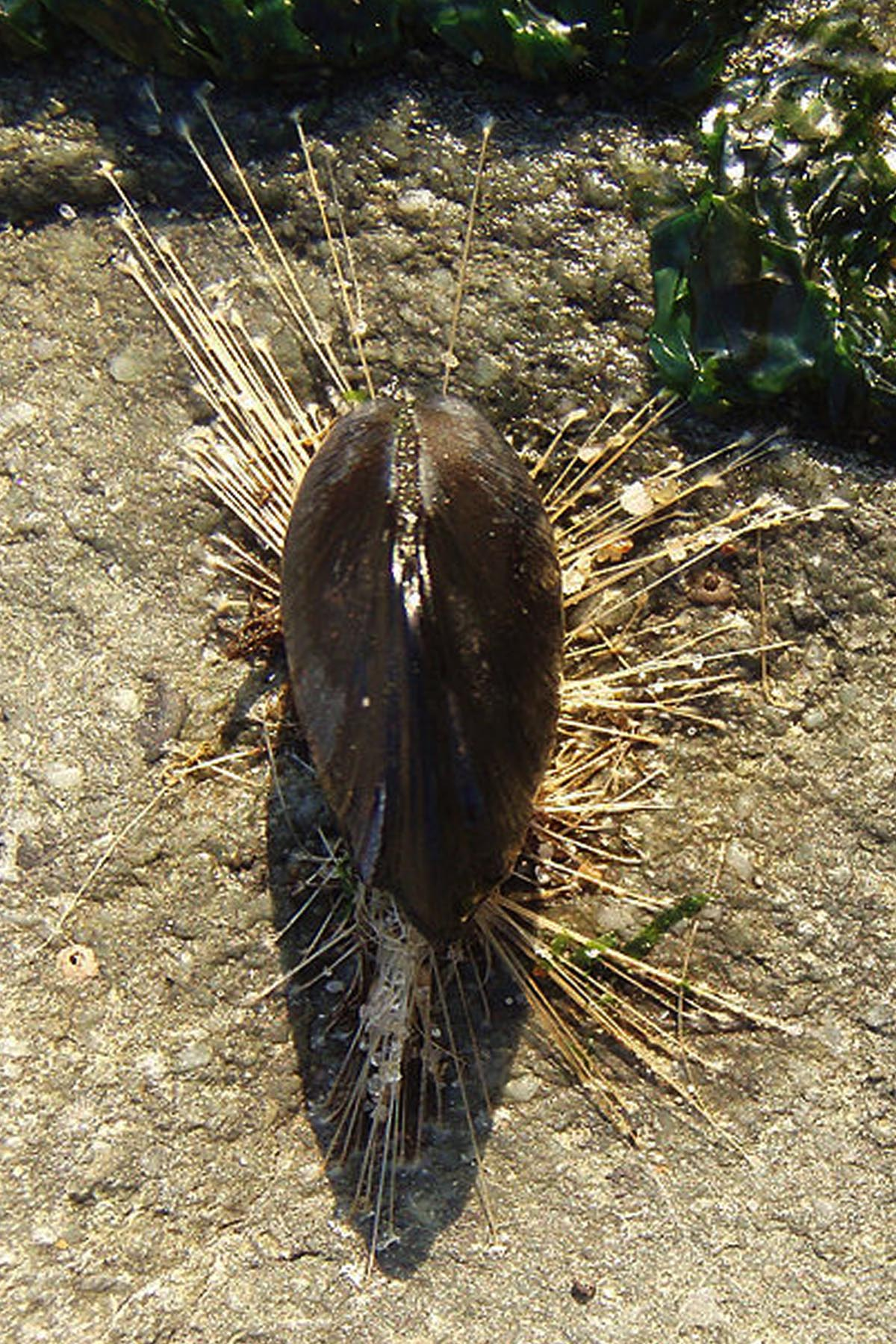
A mussel (genus Mytilus), attached to a rock by its byssus

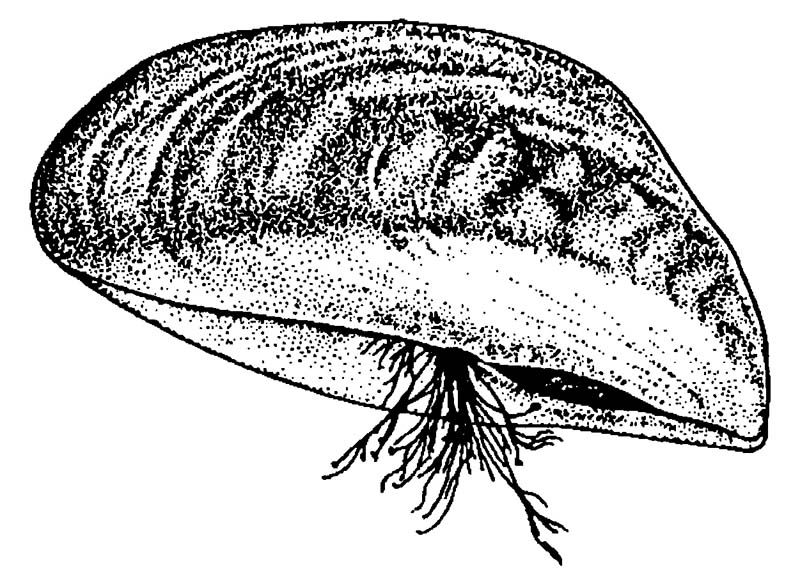
Illustration of the byssus of Dreissena polymorpha, the freshwater zebra mussel

A byssus (/ˈbɪsəs/) is a bundle of filaments secreted by many species of bivalve mollusc that function to attach the mollusc to a solid surface. Species from several families of clams have a byssus, including pen shells (Pinnidae), true mussels (Mytilidae), and Dreissenidae.

== Filaments ==
Byssus filaments are created by certain kinds of marine and freshwater bivalve mollusks, which use the byssus to attach themselves to rocks, substrates, or seabeds. In edible mussels, the inedible byssus is commonly known as the "beard", and is removed before cooking.

Many species of mussels secrete byssus threads to anchor themselves to surfaces, with families including the Mytilidae, Arcidae, Anomiidae, Pinnidae, Pectinidae, Dreissenidae, and Unionidae.

== Mechanics ==
The byssus, or byssal complex, is composed of multiple extracellular collagenous threads that are placed radially by the mussel from a central stem. Each thread is composed of three regions: a corrugated proximal region close to the mussel body, a longer, smooth distal region connecting the proximal region to the ending plaque, and the adhesive plaque itself, which anchors the mussel to the surface. The proximal region consists of a corrugated sheath enveloping loosely-arranged coiled fibers; these coils can unravel to extend the fiber under an applied force. The distal region is more ordered, consisting of aligned collagenous fiber bundles that give the fiber stiffness. The plaque consists of collagen-like fibers over a spongy matrix in which the adhesive protein is deposited and hardens.

The purpose of the byssus is to keep the mussel attached to the desired surface, and to this end byssal threads must be able to withstand strong cyclic motion due to tidal action near the shorelines mussels inhabit. Mechanical testing of live mussels has shown that byssal threads can extend 39% before yield and 64% before breaking, at a nominal strain rate of 10 mm/min. Tensile testing shows that threads exhibit three distinct phases: initial stiffness from both the distal and proximal regions, softening due to yield in the distal region, and finally stiffening directly preceding tensile failure. The ability of the distal region to yield before breaking gives the mussels their characteristic hardiness even under strong tidal forces. Many variables that influence the performance of byssal threads have been studied, including species variations, seasonal variations, temperature effects, and aging effects. Temperature effects in particular have revealed a glass transition temperature of 6 °C.

The number of threads used by a mussel to attach is typically between 20 and 60; this can vary by the species, season, or age of the mussel. Under cyclic tidal conditions, the radial spread of fiber placement allows the mussel to dynamically align most of its fibers in the direction of applied force. This lowers the stress on any one thread, reducing the chances of failure and detachment. Mussels are also capable of ejecting the entire byssal complex, including the central stem, without damaging themselves. The complex can simply be regenerated, with fibers placement resuming within 24 hours.

When a mussel's foot encounters a crevice, it creates a vacuum chamber by forcing out the air and arching up, similar to a plumber's plunger unclogging a drain. The byssus, which is made of keratin, quinone-tanned proteins (polyphenolic proteins), and other proteins, is spewed into this chamber in a liquid form (similar to injection moulding in polymer processing) which then bubbles into a sticky foam. By curling its foot into a tube and pumping the foam, the mussel produces sticky threads each about the size of a human hair. The mussel then varnishes the threads with another protein, resulting in an adhesive.

== Historical uses ==
"Byssus" often refers to the long, fine, silky threads secreted by the large Mediterranean pen shell, Pinna nobilis. The byssus threads from this Pinna species can be up to 6 cm (2.4 in) in length and have historically been made into cloth. Byssus cloth is a rare fabric, also known as sea silk, that is made using the byssus of pen shells as the fiber source. The byssus of Atrina pectinata, a shell of the same family, has been used in Sardinia as a substitute for critically endangered Pinna nobilis, to weave sea silk.

Byssus was used by Carl Linnaeus as a genus of plants (some later known to be cyanobacteria). It has little relevance in current taxonomy, as most specimens are either lost or not identified. The ones that are identified have been either synonymized (B. jolithus, B. aurea) or turned into nomen rejiciendum (B. cryptarum).

== Engineering uses ==
The attachment dynamics of the plaque have been studied by engineers. Applications of biomimetic byssus adhesive include biomedical adhesives, therapeutic applications, and anti-fouling coatings.

Byssus is a remarkable adhesive, one that is neither degraded nor deformed by water as many synthetic adhesives are. The remarkable properties of this adhesive, specifically the mussel foot proteins (Mfps), has spurred many attempts to imitate the excellent adhesive capacity that mussels show, either by producing Mfps via other organisms or by creating synthetic polymers with similar properties. For instance, genetic engineers have inserted mussel DNA into yeast cells to translate the genes into the appropriate proteins. Synthetic approaches generally utilize catechol as a cross-linking agent to produce wear-resistant polymer networks. Imitation of Mfp-3 to induce coacervation is another key property, as this protects the material from partial dissolution in saltwater.The protein structure of byssus is reminiscent of that of silk produced by insects. Other examples of biomimetic approaches for creating mussel-inspired adhesives use these polymers as a backbone.

Foul release strategies such as fluoropolymer paints and lubricant-infused coatings are also an active research area. The aim is to prevent the fouling of marine structures by invasive mussel species such as the zebra and quagga mussel.
