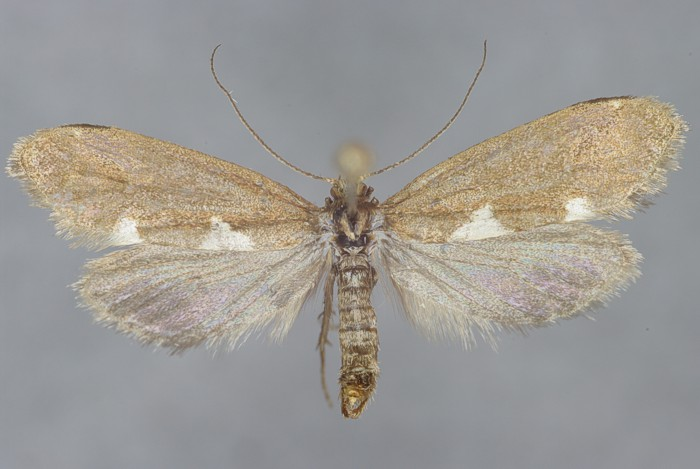

Scientific classification
- Domain: Eukaryota
- Kingdom: Animalia
- Phylum: Arthropoda
- Class: Insecta
- Order: Lepidoptera
- Family: Incurvariidae
- Genus: Incurvaria
- Species: I. vetulella

Binomial name
- Incurvaria vetulella (Zetterstedt, 1839)

Synonyms
- Adela vetulella Zetterstedt, 1839; Incurvaria kivatshella Kutenkova, 1987

= Incurvaria vetulella =

Species of moth

Incurvaria vetulella is a moth of the family Incurvariidae. It is found in Fennoscandia, Russia, Germany, Poland, the Czech Republic, Slovakia, Austria, Switzerland, Slovenia, Romania and Bulgaria. In the east, the range extends to Japan.

The wingspan is 16–21 mm. Adults are on wing from June to July.

The larvae feed on Vaccinium species, including Vaccinium myrtillus and Vaccinium vitis-idaea.
