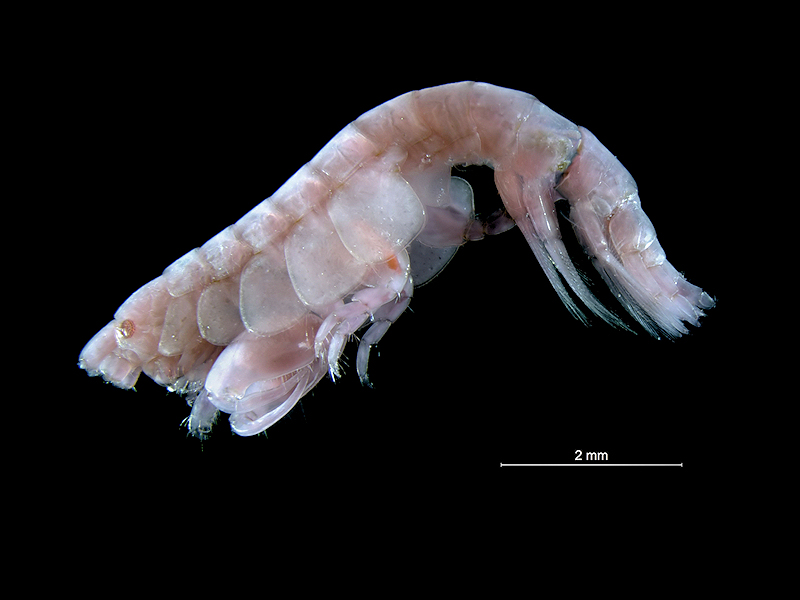
- Sunamphitoe pelagica (Milne-Edwards, 1830) - A benthic amphipod from the Belgian part of the North Sea. Length : 8 mm

Scientific classification
- Kingdom: Animalia
- Phylum: Arthropoda
- Clade: Pancrustacea
- Class: Malacostraca
- Order: Amphipoda
- Superfamily: Corophioidea
- Family: Ampithoidae; Boeck, 1871

Synonyms
- AmpithoinaeBoeck, 1871; Biancolinidae J.L. Barnard, 1972; Exampithoinae Myers & Lowry, 2003

= Ampithoidae =

Family of crustaceans

Ampithoidae is a family of amphipod crustaceans. The family has a worldwide distribution as algal dwellers. They commonly create tube-shaped nests on their host plants or algae which serve as both shelter and food. Young ampithoids develop from eggs to a larval stage within their mother's brood-pouch, formed by the appendages of her abdomen.

== Genera ==
The World Register of Marine Species includes the following genera in this family:-

- Amphithoides Kossmann, 1880
- Amphitholina Ruffo, 1953
- Ampithoe Leach, 1814
- Austrothoe Peart, 2014
- Biancolina Della Valle, 1893
- Cymadusa Savigny, 1816
- Exampithoe K.H. Barnard, 1926
- Macropisthopus K.H. Barnard, 1916
- Paradusa Ruffo, 1969
- Paragrubia Chevreux, 1901
- Paranexes Peart, 2014
- Pleonexes Spence Bate, 1857
- Plumithoe Barnard & Karaman, 1991
- Pseudamphithoides Ortiz, 1976 (e.g. Pseudamphithoides incurvaria)
- Pseudopleonexes Conlan, 1982
- Sunamphitoe Spence Bate, 1857 (e.g. Sunamphitoe femorata)
