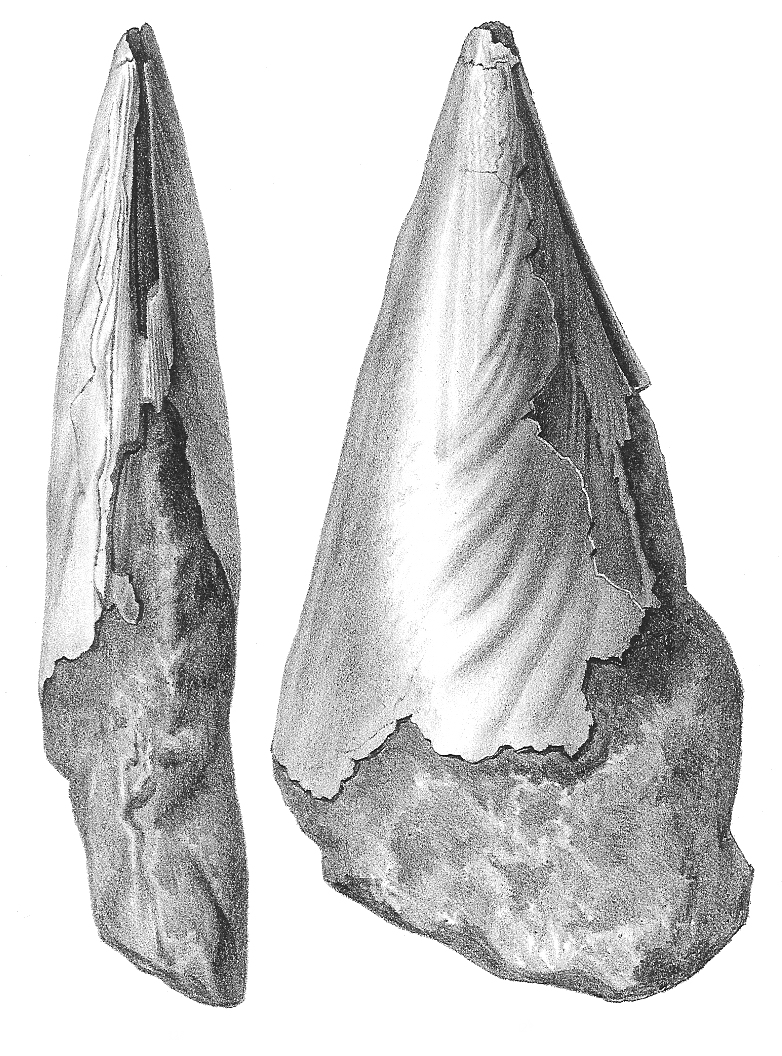

Scientific classification
- Kingdom: Animalia
- Phylum: Mollusca
- Class: Bivalvia
- Order: Pteriida
- Family: Pinnidae
- Genus: Atrina
- Species: A. pectinata

Binomial name
- Atrina pectinata (Linnaeus, 1767)

= Atrina pectinata =

Species of bivalve

Atrina pectinata is a species of bivalves belonging to the family Pinnidae, and has the common names comb pen shell and fan mussel in English.

The species is found in the Old World. They are important in commercial fishing in Asia, where its meat is prized as seafood. A. pectinata is a sedentary long-lived species that lives up to 7 years. The byssus has been used in Sardinia to weave sea silk, as a replacement for the byssus of critically endangered Pinna nobilis.

== Appearance ==
A. pectinata are patchy with small clusters. Their common name in Korean is 키조개 kijogae, literally "winnowing basket clam", due to their resemblance to the traditional Korean tool.

There are two physical morphs of A. pectinata: scaly and smooth, as a result of how the shells develop. Recent research suggests that the two morphs are different enough for them to be taxonomically distinguishable.

== Distribution ==
A. pectinata is widely located in the Indo-West Pacific. The shellfish is an inhabitant of muddy or sandy surfaces. In the Bohai Sea and Yellow Sea off the coast of northern China, it is found at habitats ranging from the subtidal zone to depths of 100m. It is also found along the coasts of Guangdong, Guangxi and Hainan in the South China Sea, and these are believed to be a similar lineage to the northern Chinese populations. However, some genetic differentiation can be seen between the South China Sea population and that off the coast of Guangxi in the Gulf of Tonkin.

In Korea, the shellfish is located in ocean depths of 20 to 50 m in muddy areas. It can be found in the south seashore of Yeoja Bay in Yeosu and the western coasts of Boryeong and Taean.

In Japan, large numbers of A. pectinata were traditionally found off the southwestern coast, with commercial activity centered around Kyushu Island, especially around the Ariake Sea. Other sources of commercial distribution include Mikawa Bay and the Seto Inland Sea, especially the regions of Okayama, Kagawa and Saga.

The species name has long been misapplied to the European species Atrina fragilis, following a synonymization in the 1812 edition of British Zoology by Thomas Pennant. However, this has been deemed erroneous.

== Development ==
A suspension study of A. pectinata showed that in artificial habitats, gonad development occurred at the same time for both male and female pen shells and corresponded to warming water temperatures and increased food availability. A. pectinata is a broadcast spawner with external fertilization. Spawning occurs after gonad development during the period from May to September and expended gonads are ejected in the fall. Spawning is often triggered by environmental cues such as temperature. 1.6% of spawning individuals are hermaphroditic. A. pectinata has a pelagic larval phase that lasts about 30 days and mean fecundities of 29 million eggs per year, which suggests high dispersal potential.

== Conservation ==
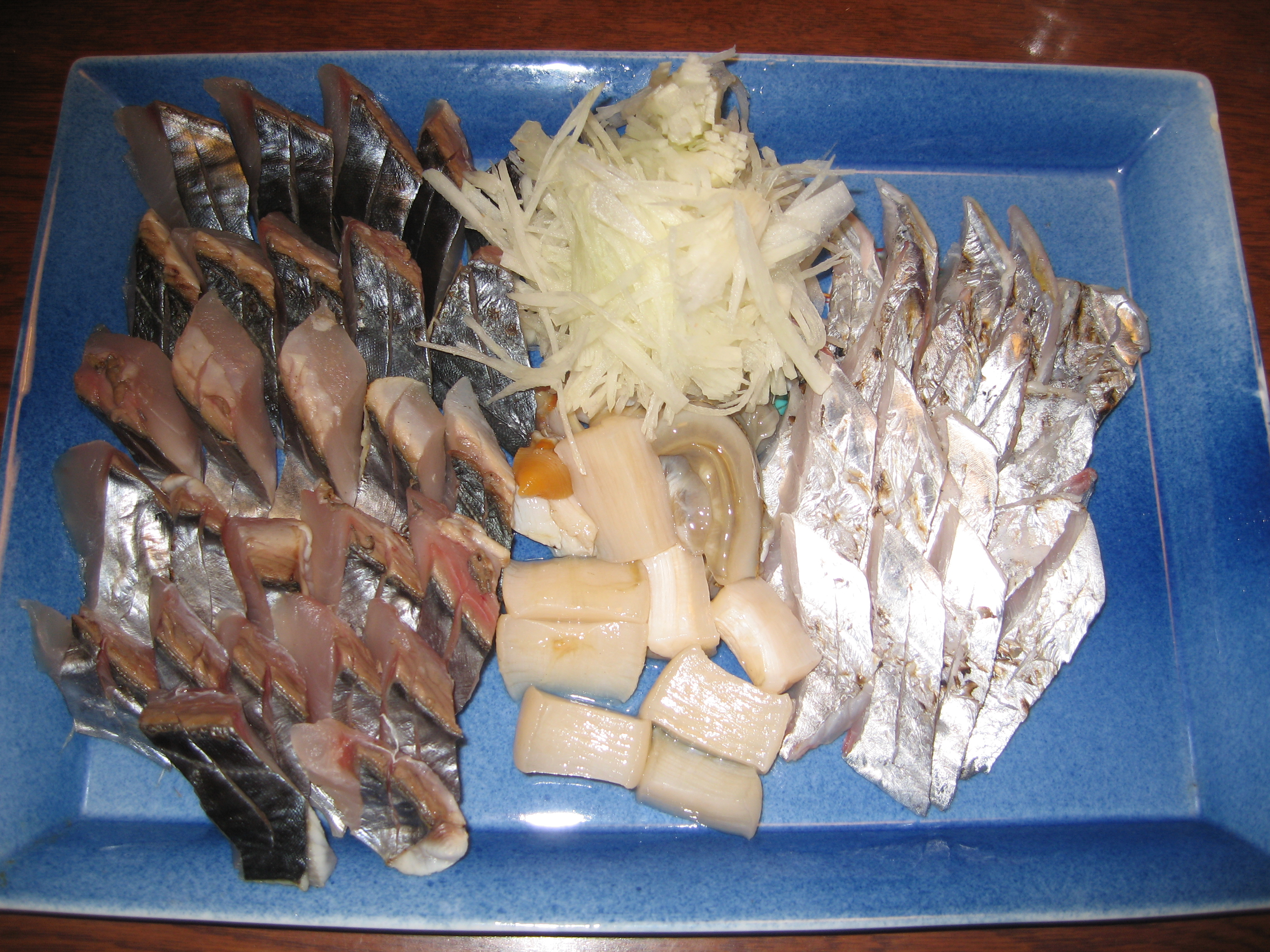
A. pectinata, Japanese: tairagi (玉珧), prepared for consumption as part of a tray of sashimi (bottom middle)

A. pectinata population has decreased rapidly since 1990 as a result of overfishing, habitat loss from coastal development, pollution, etc. It is a popular food source and is commercially important to a number of countries which makes it a great interest to fisheries. However, an effort to preserve this species has been made by aquaculture development. This species serves as a commercial value, especially in the country of Korea. It serves great purpose in Korean fisheries. The shellfish was also desired for its taste for several years before its decline in the 1990s.

A. pectinata mortality events in 2003 and 2004 reveal that the southwestern Japan population suffered from necrosis in their gills and kidneys not caused by known pathogenic agents. The presence of particles resembling viral matter in the necrotic tissue may hint at an unknown viral agent that can trigger mass mortality events. These mass mortality events are a part of a long decline in the population off the southern coast of Japan.

In an effort to conserve the shellfish species, microsatellite markers have been used to access the genetic variability and differentiation of A. pectinata. Only one finding has shown that microsatellite markers were able to find genetic differentiation among the wild and hatchery population in Korea. However, more sources need to confirm the genetic information and diversity of the pen shell in order to conserve the species.
