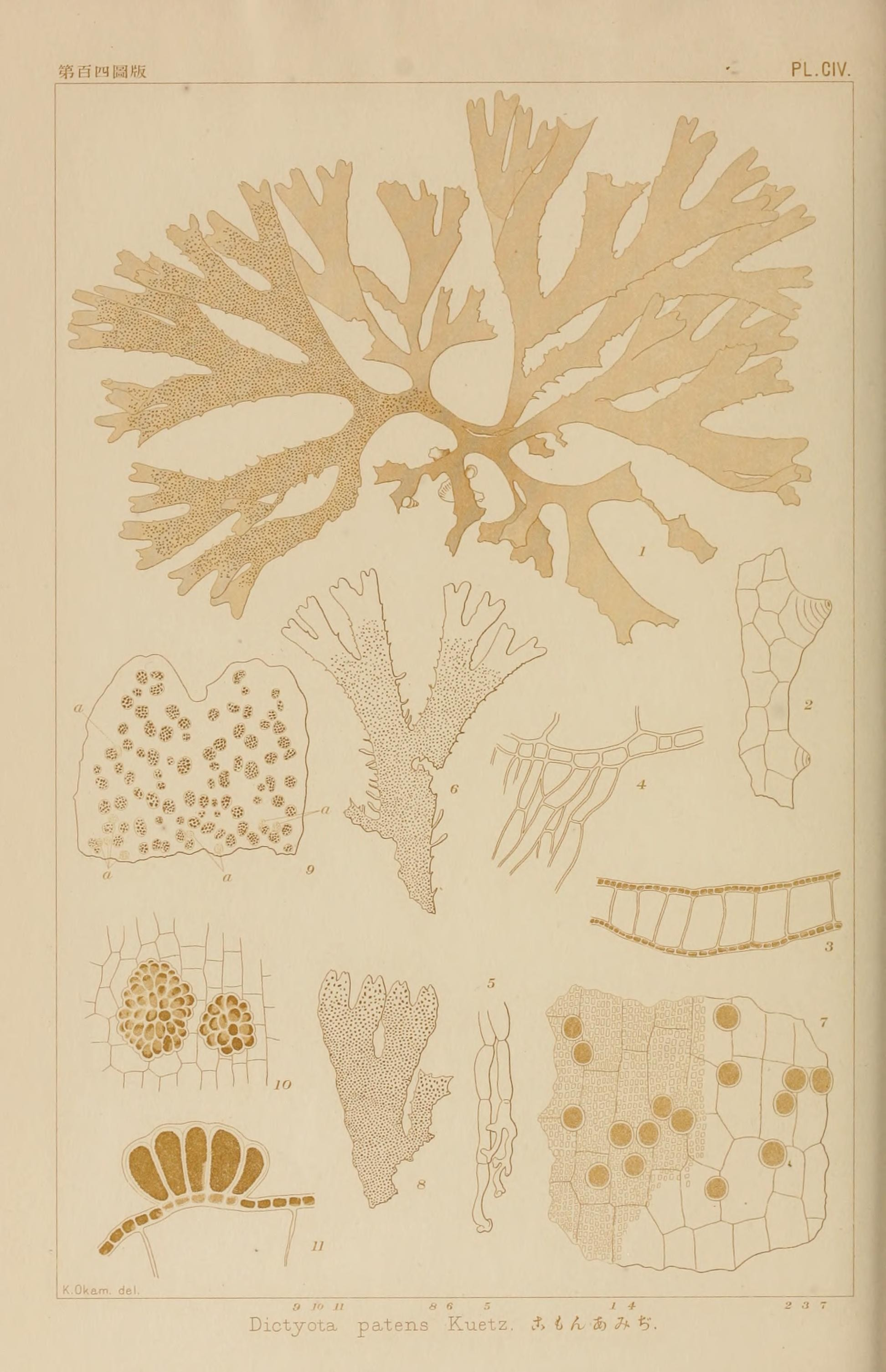
- Illustration of Dictyota bartayresiana

Scientific classification
- Domain: Eukaryota
- Clade: Diaphoretickes
- Clade: SAR
- Clade: Stramenopiles
- Phylum: Gyrista
- Subphylum: Ochrophytina
- Class: Phaeophyceae
- Order: Dictyotales
- Family: Dictyotaceae
- Genus: Dictyota
- Species: D. bartayresiana

Binomial name
- Dictyota bartayresiana J.V.Lamouroux

Synonyms
- Dictyota bartayresii J.V.Lamouroux; Dictyota neglecta Hörnig & Schnetter; Dictyota patens J.Agardh; Ulva bartayresiana (Lamouroux) Mart.; Zonaria bartayresiana (Lamouroux) C.Agardh

= Dictyota bartayresiana =

Species of brown algae

Dictyota bartayresiana, commonly known as a forded sea tumbleweed, is a species of brown alga found in the tropical western Indo-Pacific region and the Gulf of Mexico. It contains chemicals that are being researched for possible use as antimicrobials, as larvicides and as cytotoxins.

== Description ==
Dictyota bartayresiana grows to a height of 9 to 14 cm (3.5 to 5.5 in), being anchored to the seabed by a variably-shaped holdfast surrounded by rhizoids. The blades are flat and branch dichotomously. The thallus is 6 to 10 mm (0.2 to 0.4 in) wide below each junction and 2 to 4 mm (0.1 to 0.2 in) wide just above; the sections are 10 to 15 mm (0.4 to 0.6 in) long and have no midrib. The margins of the blade are entire and the tips rounded in young fronds and pointed in older ones. The sporangia are 125 to 140 μm in diameter.

== Distribution and habitat ==
This seaweed is found in the tropical western central Pacific Ocean and the tropical western Atlantic Ocean, including the Gulf of Mexico. It occurs at depths down to about 108 m (350 ft).

== Research ==
Several diterpenes and other secondary metabolites are present in D. bartayresiana. The methanolic and chloroform extracts of the seaweed exhibit antibacterial activity against Escherichia coli, Shigella flexneri and Pseudomonas aeruginosa, and the petroleum extract exhibits a similar effect against Morganella morganii. The methanolic extract is also effective as a larvicide against the mosquito Culex quinquefasciatus, and shows toxicity to the nauplii larvae of brine shrimps, a proxy for antitumour activity. This means that the seaweed shows promise as a broad spectrum antibacterial, a larvicide and a cytotoxic substance. Further research is needed to identify the active ingredients responsible for these effects.

== Ecology ==
The diterpenes contained in this alga are distasteful to fish, which avoid eating the seaweed. Pseudamphithoides incurvaria, a species of amphipod, feeds on the seaweed and builds a "domicile" from fragments of the fronds, and lives inside this. This casing deters potential fish predators from eating the amphipod.
