= Ascidonia quasipusilla =

Scientific classification
- Kingdom: Animalia
- Phylum: Arthropoda
- Clade: Pancrustacea
- Class: Malacostraca
- Order: Decapoda
- Suborder: Pleocyemata
- Infraorder: Caridea
- Family: Palaemonidae
- Genus: Ascidonia
- Species: A. quasipusilla

Binomial name
- Ascidonia quasipusilla (Chace, 1972)

Species of shrimp

Ascidonia quasipusilla is a species of caridean shrimp (true shrimps) that belongs to the family Palaemonidae. This species can be found in the Western Atlantic Ocean in the Caribbean Sea.
