= Incurvaria evocata =

Scientific classification
- Kingdom: Animalia
- Phylum: Arthropoda
- Class: Insecta
- Order: Lepidoptera
- Family: Incurvariidae
- Genus: Incurvaria
- Species: I. evocata

Binomial name
- Incurvaria evocata (Meyrick, 1924)

Synonyms
- Chalceopla evocata Meyrick, 1924

Species of moth

Incurvaria evocata is a moth of the family Incurvariidae. It is known from India.

The wingspan is about 8 mm.
