= Incurvaria ploessli =

Scientific classification
- Kingdom: Animalia
- Phylum: Arthropoda
- Clade: Pancrustacea
- Class: Insecta
- Order: Lepidoptera
- Family: Incurvariidae
- Genus: Incurvaria
- Species: I. ploessli

Binomial name
- Incurvaria ploessli Huemer, 1993

Species of moth

Incurvaria ploessli is a moth of the family Incurvariidae. It is found in France, Italy and possibly Switzerland.
