= Incurvaria takeuchii =

Scientific classification
- Kingdom: Animalia
- Phylum: Arthropoda
- Class: Insecta
- Order: Lepidoptera
- Family: Incurvariidae
- Genus: Incurvaria
- Species: I. takeuchii

Binomial name
- Incurvaria takeuchii Issiki, 1957

Species of moth

Incurvaria takeuchii is a moth of the family Incurvariidae. It is found on the main island (Honshu) of Japan.

The wingspan is 15.5–19 mm for males and 10.5–18 mm for females. The forewings are glossy blackish-brown.

The larvae feed on Clethra barbinervis. They create and oval ellipsoidal case consisting of three pieces. The larva overwinters on the ground. Pupation takes place in spring.
