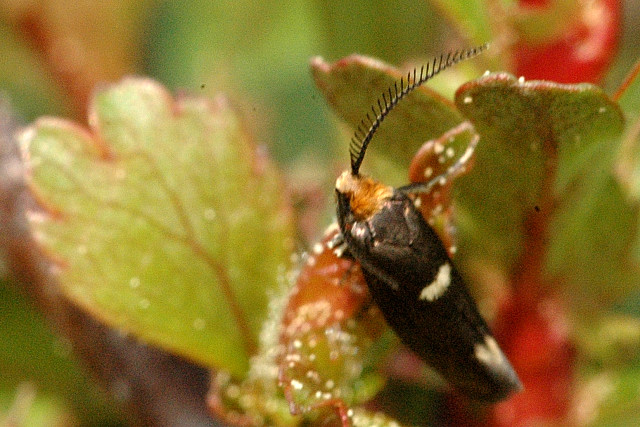

Scientific classification
- Domain: Eukaryota
- Kingdom: Animalia
- Phylum: Arthropoda
- Class: Insecta
- Order: Lepidoptera
- Family: Incurvariidae
- Genus: Incurvaria; Riley, 1892

Synonyms
- Excurvaria Kuprijanov, 1994; Brosis Billberg, 1820

= Incurvaria =

Genus of moths

Incurvaria is a genus of moths of the family Incurvariidae.

== Selected species ==
- Incurvaria alniella (Issiki, 1957)
- Incurvaria circulella (Zetterstedt, 1839)
- Incurvaria evocata (Meyrick, 1924)
- Incurvaria koerneriella (Zeller, 1839)
- Incurvaria masculella (Denis & Schiffermuller, 1775)
- Incurvaria oehlmanniella (Hubner, 1796)
- Incurvaria pectinea Haworth, 1828
- Incurvaria pirinella (Junnilainen, Kaitila & Mutanen, 2020)
- Incurvaria ploessli Huemer, 1993
- Incurvaria praelatella (Denis & Schiffermuller, 1775)
- Incurvaria takeuchii Issiki, 1957
- Incurvaria triglavensis Hauder, 1912
- Incurvaria vetulella (Zetterstedt, 1839)
