= Sea silk =

Type of rare fabric

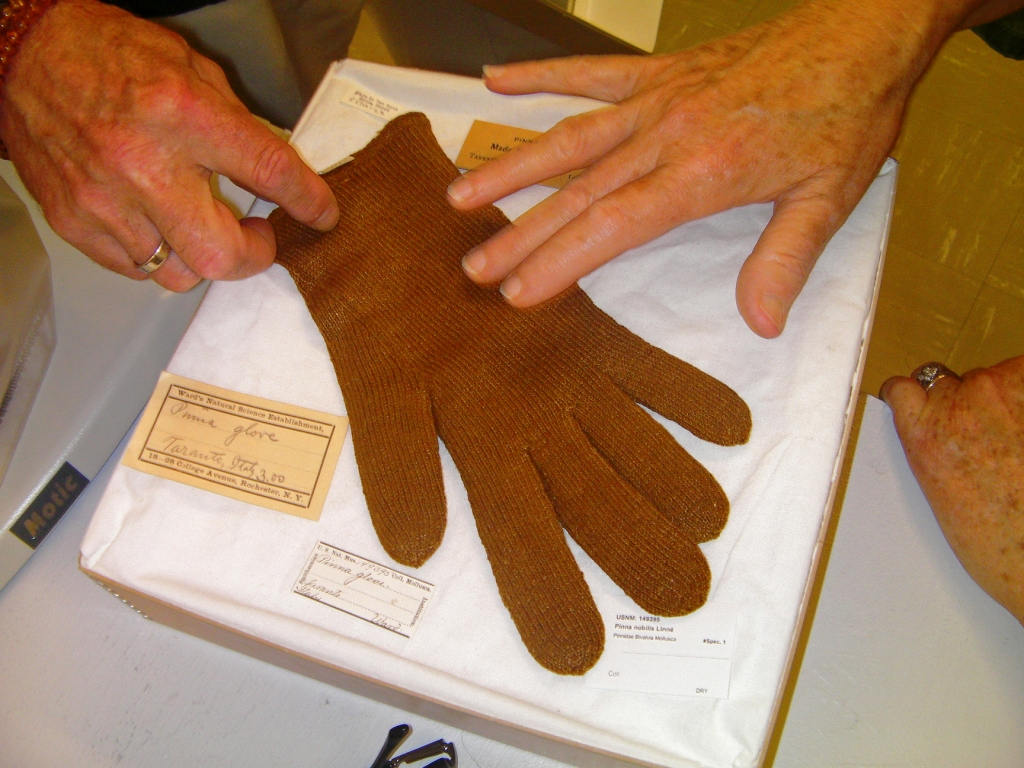
Knitted glove made of sea silk, from Taranto, Italy, probably from the late 19th century

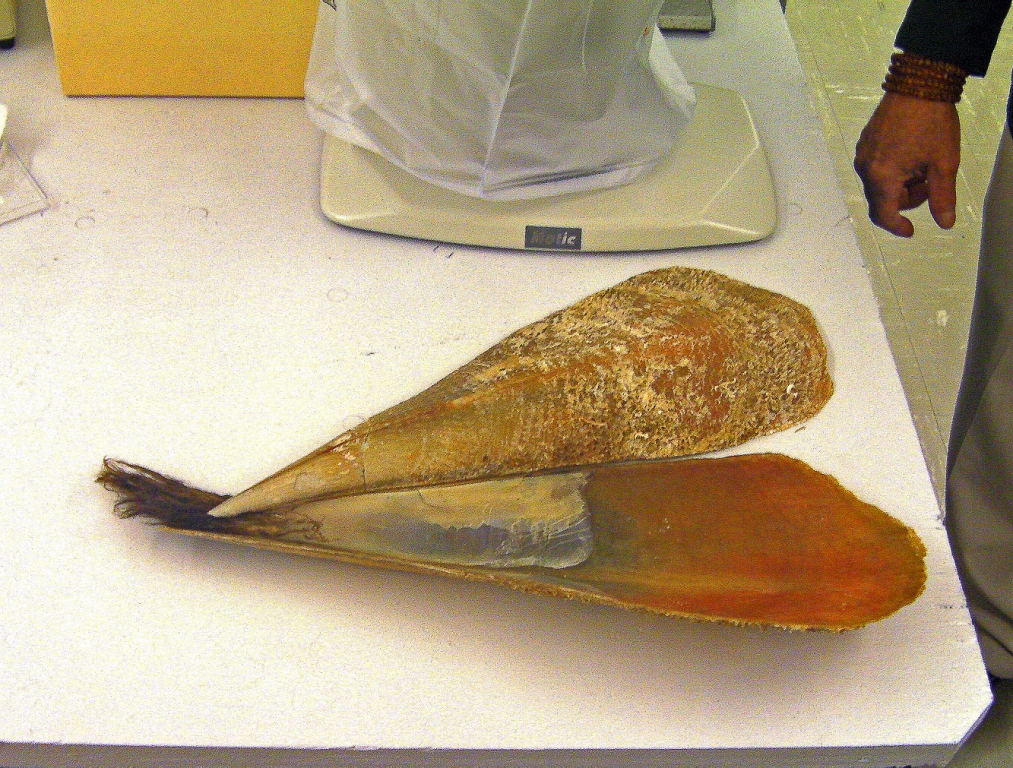
Pinna nobilis shell and byssus

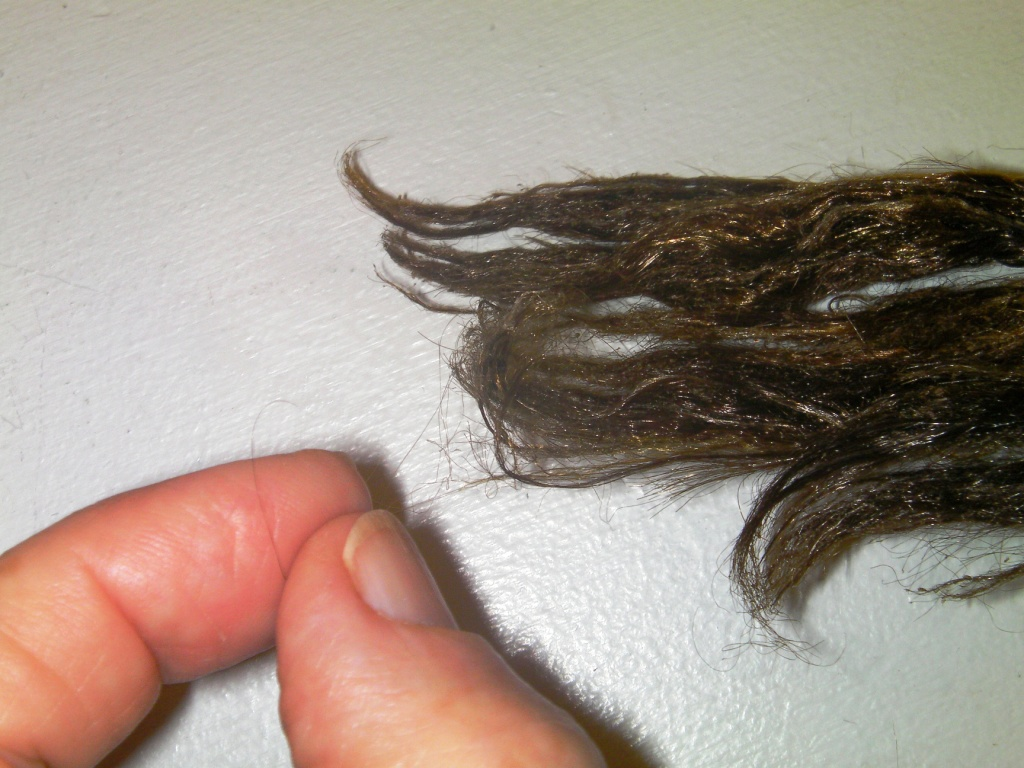
The extreme fineness of the byssus thread

Sea silk is an extremely rare fabric that is made from the long silky filaments, or byssus, secreted by a gland in the foot of pen shells (in particular Pinna nobilis). The byssus is used by the mussel to attach itself to the sea bed. It was previously produced in Sardinia and Taranto until the early 20th century and is still made at small scale by a few people in Sardinia.

The cloth produced from byssus is extremely light and warm. It is also often described as being very thin, although it is similar in thickness to other fibers such as silk. Byssus was said to be so fine that a pair of women's gloves made from the fabric could fit into half a walnut shell and a pair of stockings in a snuffbox. However, Helen Scales has put forward the idea that this actually refers to Limerick gloves made from fine kid leather sold inside walnut shells as a marketing stunt, and that over time the walnut packaging and beliefs about byssus cloth were conflated.

== Production ==
Pinna nobilis produces a beard of about 1,000 fibers to attach itself to the sea floor, which are all attached to a central stem. They can be up to 20 centimetres (7.9 in) long.

The removed beard is processed in several steps. First, it is rinsed in the sea to remove debris. It is then washed in fresh water and manually cleaned. This may be followed by a third bath, again in fresh water. After drying, it is carded and then spun by hand. Beginning in the early 19th century, the beards were sometimes left intact after being cleaned and combed and then sewn together in a close, overlapping manner to produce an effect resembling fur.

The fibers vary in color and have a unique egg-shaped profile when viewed under a microscope. They are 10–50 microns in diameter, which is comparable to other natural fibers such as silk (11–15 microns), merino wool (18–25 microns) or mohair (20–40 microns). It is not very strong, especially when wet, compared to other fibers.

Bysus can be soaked in lemon juice for a few hours to produce a golden color. There are no known historical examples of dyed sea silk, probably because the natural color was highly valued. Modern experiments with dyeing sea silk have not shown dramatic color changes.

While a few extant woven objects are known, most were knit, and many are gloves. A knitted pair of gloves probably took the byssus from around 150 shells to produce. There are historical reports of sea silk being mixed with silk, probably for economic reasons, and also with wool, though very few objects with mixed fibers are now known to exist. Sea silk fibers may also be used for embroidery.

== History ==
Tracing the history of sea silk is difficult in part because the word byssus originally referred to fine fabric made of linen or perhaps cotton, and in the Middle Ages, also to that made of silk. The first written mentions of sea silk date to the 2nd century AD, and the oldest piece of sea silk that has been found dated to the 4th century AD; a fragment was discovered in a grave in Budapest in the remains of Aquincum. However, the fragment was lost during World War II. The oldest surviving sea silk object is a knit hat from the 14th century, which was found in a waste pit near Paris.

=== Egypt ===
The Greek text of the (196 BC) Rosetta Stone records that Ptolemy V reduced taxes on priests, including one paid in byssus cloth. This is thought to be fine linen cloth, not sea silk. In Ancient Egyptian burial customs, byssus was used to wrap mummies; this was also linen and not sea silk.

=== Greece ===
The sophist author Alciphron first records "sea wool" in his (c. 2nd century AD) "Galenus to Cryton" letter.

Sea silk has been suggested as an interpretation of the nature of the Golden Fleece that was sought by Jason and the Argonauts but scholars reject this hypothesis.

=== Roman Empire ===
The early Christian Tertullian (c. 160–220 AD) mentions it when justifying his wearing a pallium instead of a toga:

Nor was it enough to comb and to sew the materials for a tunic. It was necessary also to fish for one's dress; for fleeces are obtained from the sea where shells of extraordinary size are furnished with tufts of mossy hair.

Several sources mention lana pinna ("pinna wool"). Emperor Diocletian's (301 AD) Edict on Maximum Prices lists it as a valuable textile.

The Byzantine historian Procopius's c. 550 AD Persian War, "stated that the five hereditary satraps (governors) of Armenia who received their insignia from the Roman Emperor were given chlamys (or cloaks) made from lana pinna. Apparently only the ruling classes were allowed to wear these chlamys."

=== Middle East ===
The Arabic name for "sea silk" is ṣūf al-baḥr ("sea wool"). The 9th-century Persian geographer Estakhri notes that a sea-wool robe cost more than 1000 gold pieces and records its mythic source:

At a certain period of the year an animal is seen running out of the sea and rubbing itself against certain stones of the littoral, whereupon it deposes a kind of wool of silken hue and golden colour. This wool is very rare and highly esteemed, and nothing of it is allowed to waste.

Two 13th-century authors, Ibn al-Baitar and Zakariya al-Qazwini, repeat this inaccurate "sea wool" story.

The city of Tinnis on the Nile Delta was known for its garments made of sea silk, called buqalamun from hypokalamon, the Greek name of the byssus mollusc.

=== China ===
Beginning in the Eastern Han dynasty (25–220 AD), Chinese histories document importing sea silk. Chinese language names include "cloth from the west of the sea" and "silk knitted by mermaids".

The 3rd century AD Weilüe or "Brief Account of the Wei", which was an unofficial history of the Cao Wei empire (220–265 AD), records haixi ("West of the Sea") cloth made from shuiyang ("water sheep"):

They have fine brocaded cloth that is said to be made from the down of "water-sheep". It is called Haixi ("Egyptian") cloth. This country produces the six domestic animals [traditionally: horses, cattle, sheep, chickens, dogs and pigs], which are all said to come from the water. It is said that they not only use sheep's wool, but also bark from trees, or the silk from wild silkworms, to make brocade, mats, pile rugs, woven cloth and curtains, all of them of good quality, and with brighter colours than those made in the countries of Haidong (East of the Sea).

The c. 5th century AD Hou Hanshu ("Book of the Eastern Han") expresses doubt about "water sheep" in the "Products of Daqin" section. "They also have a fine cloth which some people say is made from the down of 'water sheep,' but which is made, in fact, from the cocoons of wild silkworms". The historian Fan Ye (398–445 AD), author of the Hou Hanshu, notes this section's information comes from the report that General Ban Yong (son of General Ban Chao, 32–102 AD) presented to the Emperor in 125. Both Bans administered the Western Regions on the Silk Road. Hill considered it likely that the original reports correctly referred to sea silk, and later cloth that was examined in China was made of the similar-looking wild silk, leading to earlier reports being dismissed.

The (945 AD) Tang shu "Book of Tang" mentioned Haixi cloth from Folin (Byzantine Syria), which Emil Bretschneider first identified as sea silk from Greece. "There is also a stuff woven from the hair of sea-sheep, and called hai si pu (stuff from the western sea)". He notes, "This is, perhaps, the Byssus, a clothstuff woven up to the present time by the Mediterranean coast, especially in Southern Italy, from the thread-like excrescences of several sea-shells, (especially Pinna nobilis)."

The early 6th century AD Shuyiji ("Records of Strange Things") mentions silk woven by Jiaoren, "jiao-dragon people", which Edward H. Schafer identifies as sea silk:

In the midst of the South Sea are the houses of the kău people who dwell in the water like fish, but have not given up weaving at the loom. Their eyes have the power to weep, but what they bring forth is pearls.

This aquatic type of raw silk was called jiaoxiao, with the first character meaning "shark" and the second a form of raw silk, although it was also described in some sources as a high-quality muslin or chiffon.

=== Modern Europe ===
Archbishop Giuseppe Capecelatro gave dignitaries gifts made of sea silk in the 1780s, hoping to encourage demand to help provide for sea silk producers in need of work. Sea silk objects began to be put on display internationally in the 19th century; it was shown at the Louvre in 1801 and at the Centennial Exposition in 1876.

Sea silk was also mentioned in 19th century fiction. Alexander Serov's 1863 opera Judith includes an aria "I shall don my robe of byssus" (Russian: Я оденусь в виссон). In Jules Verne's 1870 novel Twenty Thousand Leagues Under the Seas, the crew of the Nautilus wear clothes made of byssus (alternately translated as "seashell tissue" or "fan-mussel fabric").

The sea silk industry in Taranto grew somewhat, beginning in the 1920s, with the advent of a private school run by Rita del Bene; however, it disappeared there with the onset of World War II, and it did not return after the war. Also in the 1920s, Italo Diana began a school on the island of Sant'Antioco near Sardinia.

Pinna nobilis has become threatened with extinction, due to overfishing, the decline in seagrass fields, and pollution. Since 2016, populations have also been attacked by a parasite called Haplosporidium pinnae, which has caused mass die-offs. As it has declined so dramatically, the sea silk industry has almost disappeared, and byssus is difficult to come by; since 1992, it is illegal to harm or harvest living Pinna nobilis. The art is now preserved only by a few women in Sant'Antioco.

"Project Sea-Silk" from the Natural History Museum of Basel, run by Felicitas Maeder, has been collecting extensive data and studies on the subject since 1997.

Chiara Vigo has claimed in various media to be the sole person living today to master the art of working with byssus, and she runs the Sea Silk Museum in Sant'Antioco. Maeder has accused Vigo of creating a false historical narrative about sea silk. Vigo says she has a method to harvest bysus without harming the shells by trimming 10 centimetres (3.9 in) from the beard, although Scales expressed skepticism that this would produce the amount of byssus Vigo says she takes (600 grams (21 oz) per year; the intact beards of fifty shells produce 30 grams).

A few other women also still produce and work with byssus in Sant'Antioco, such as the sisters Assuntina and Giuseppina Pes, who were taught the art by Efisia Murroni. Murroni, who was a pupil of Diana, died in 2013 aged 100. The sisters use vintage byssus that has been donated to them, and the byssus of Atrina pectinata, a shell in the same family, has been used by Arianna Pintus in her workshop in Tratalias as a substitute for Pinna nobilis.

== See also ==
- Coa vestis, a textile made in ancient Greece from wild silk.
