= Sunamphitoe femorata =

Peramphithoe femorata

Scientific classification
- Kingdom: Animalia
- Phylum: Arthropoda
- Class: Malacostraca
- Order: Amphipoda
- Family: Ampithoidae
- Genus: Sunamphitoe
- Species: S. femorata

Binomial name
- Sunamphitoe femorata (Krøyer, 1845)

Synonyms
- Ampithoe femorata Krøyer, 1845; Peramphithoe brevipes (Dana, 1852); Peramphithoe falklandi (Bate, 1862); Peramphithoe femorata Krøyer, 1845; Peramphithoe gaudichaudii (Milne-Edwards, 1840); Peramphithoe peregrina (Dana, 1852)

Species of crustacean

Sunamphitoe femorata is a species of amphipod crustacean in the family Ampithoidae. It is a herbivore and constructs a tubular nest-like home on a blade of the sporophyte of the giant kelp Macrocystis pyrifera. This home is made by rolling the sides of the blade together and securing them with silk. As the kelp blade grows, the nest is advanced down the blade towards the base, approximately keeping pace with the algal growth.

== Taxonomy ==
The species was originally described in 1845 as Ampithoe femorata by Henrik Nikolai Krøyer and moved to Peramphithoe femorata' in 1982. Following a phylogenetic analysis that found neither Peramphithoe nor Sunamphitoe monophyletic, with the species intermingled within a clade, the two genera were synonymised and Peramphithoe femorata renamed Sunamphitoe femorata.

== Distribution ==
Sunamphitoe femorata has been reported from the Caribbean Sea, Venezuela and the Southern Ocean.

== Behaviour ==
Sunamphitoe femorata is a tubicolous (tube-forming) amphipod that feeds and makes its home on the giant kelp Macrocystis pyrifera. This brown alga is found in shallow water and can grow to a length of 45 m (148 ft) in a single season. It is attached to the substrate by a holdfast from which grow several long slender stems. These are clad in numerous small leaf-like blades growing from pneumatocysts (gas-filled bladders) and it is on these blades that the amphipod lives. The blades grow continuously from near their bases and the amphipod chooses a position some way along a blade, rolling the edges together to form a tube. It first deposits a mass of silk on the blade and grips this with its 5th, 6th and 7th pereopods. It then secures the edges of the blade to each other with a silken thread, produced from glands on the third and fourth pairs of pereopods, manipulating the thread with the first and second pairs. The weaving process continues rhythmically at the rate of about 24 silk attachments per minute, alternately on the left and right sides of the blade, and a tube is formed.

The meristem from which the blade grows is just above the junction with the pneumatocyst. The rate of elongation of the blade decreases over time and for about six days the nest is extended towards the base of the blade at about the same rate as the blade is growing. After that the rate of growth of the blade slows down further and the rate of nest advancement becomes more variable. At the entrance of the nest (the end nearest the base of the blade) the surface layer of the blade is grazed by the amphipod while at the other end of the nest the central tissue of the blade is also consumed. The oldest part of the blade becomes senescent and sloughs off. The amphipod does not occupy the nest continuously but sometimes moves elsewhere on the host kelp, leaving a small grazing scar to show where it has foraged. Sometimes the nest is abandoned and a new nest may be built in a different location. Researchers studying this amphipod (Cerda, Hinojosa & Thiel, 2012) hypothesised that the position chosen for the nest might be a location where the maximum nutritional value of the tissue coincided with a decrease in production of defensive chemicals by the alga.
