= Pontonia =

Scientific classification
- Kingdom: Animalia
- Phylum: Arthropoda
- Class: Malacostraca
- Order: Decapoda
- Suborder: Pleocyemata
- Infraorder: Caridea
- Family: Palaemonidae
- Genus: Pontonia; Latreille, 1829

Genus of crustaceans

Pontonia is a genus of shrimps belonging to the family Palaemonidae.

The genus has almost cosmopolitan distribution.

Species:

- Pontonia chimaera Holthuis, 1951
- Pontonia domestica Gibbes, 1850
- Pontonia longispina Holthuis, 1951
- Pontonia maculata Stimpson, 1860
- Pontonia manningi Fransen, 2000
- Pontonia margarita Smith, 1869
- Pontonia mexicana Guérin-Méneville, 1855
- Pontonia panamica Marin & Anker, 2008
- Pontonia pilosa Fransen, 2002
- Pontonia pinnae Lockington, 1878
- Pontonia pinnophylax (Otto, 1821)
- Pontonia simplex Holthuis, 1951
- Pontonia unidens Kingsley, 1880
