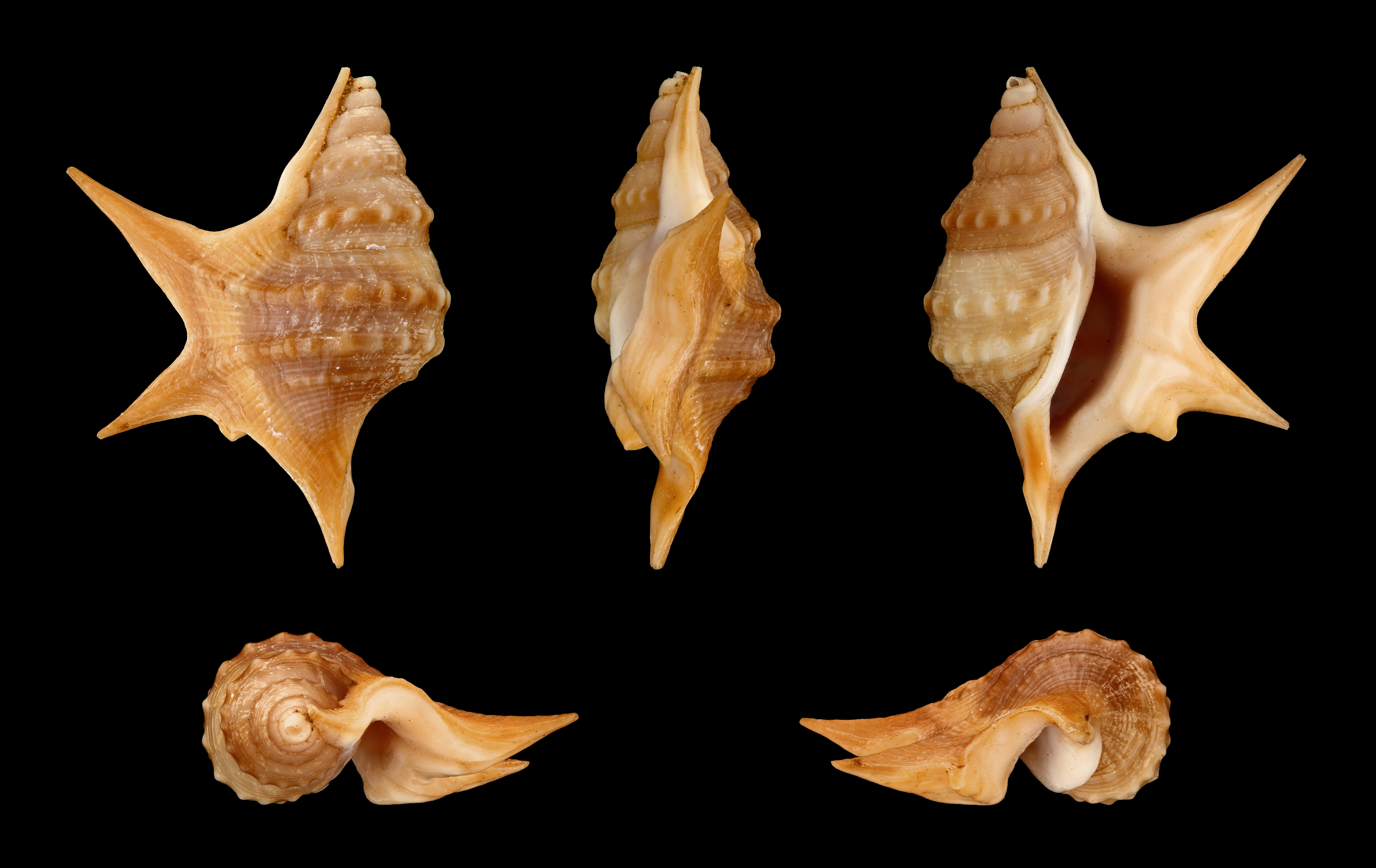

Scientific classification
- Kingdom: Animalia
- Phylum: Mollusca
- Class: Gastropoda
- Subclass: Caenogastropoda
- Order: Littorinimorpha
- Family: Aporrhaidae
- Genus: Aporrhais
- Species: A. senegalensis

Binomial name
- Aporrhais senegalensis Gray, 1838

Synonyms
- Aporrhais francheti Rochebrune, 1883

= Aporrhais senegalensis =

Species of sea snail

Aporrhais senegalensis is a species of medium-sized sea snail, a marine gastropod mollusc in the family Aporrhaidae, the pelican's foot snails or pelican's foot shells.

== Description ==
(Original description) The shell is regular and features spiral striations. The upper whorls exhibit a single central series of small nodules, while the body whorl possesses two subcentral nodule series. A third series of much smaller tubercles is present anterior to (in front of) the main nodules. The outer lip is characterized by two sharp, expanded lobes.

== Distribution ==
This marine species occurs off West Africa.
