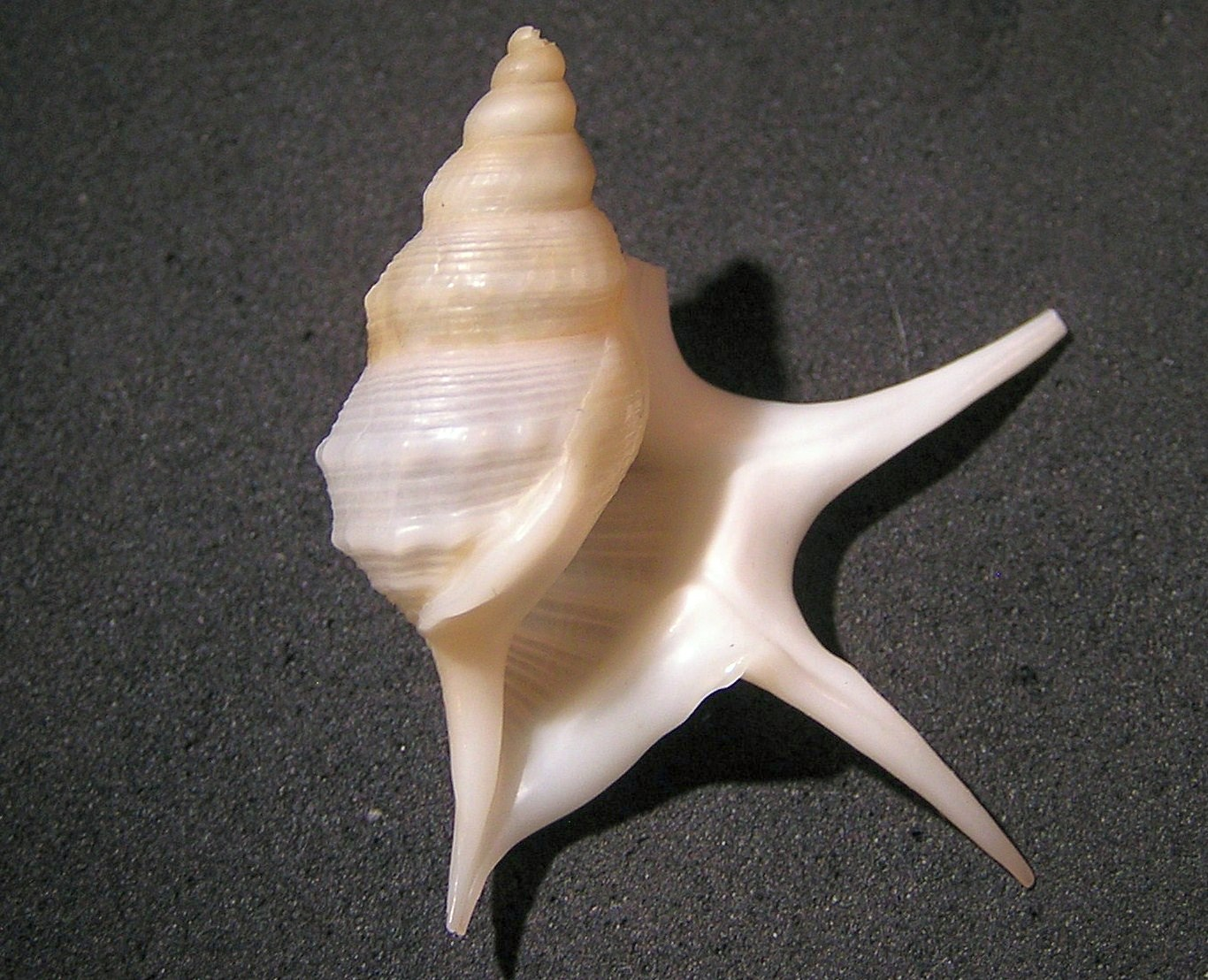
- Shell of Aporrhais elegantissima

Scientific classification
- Kingdom: Animalia
- Phylum: Mollusca
- Class: Gastropoda
- Subclass: Caenogastropoda
- Order: Littorinimorpha
- Family: Aporrhaidae
- Genus: Aporrhais
- Species: A. elegantissima

Binomial name
- Aporrhais elegantissima Parenzan, 1970

= Aporrhais elegantissima =

Species of gastropod

Aporrhais elegantissima is a species of medium-sized sea snail, a marine gastropod mollusc in the family Aporrhaidae, the pelican's foot snails or pelican's foot shells.

== Distribution ==
Found along the coast of West Africa (Senegal, Mauritania, Guinea-Bissau) and in the South Atlantic Ocean (off Angola).
