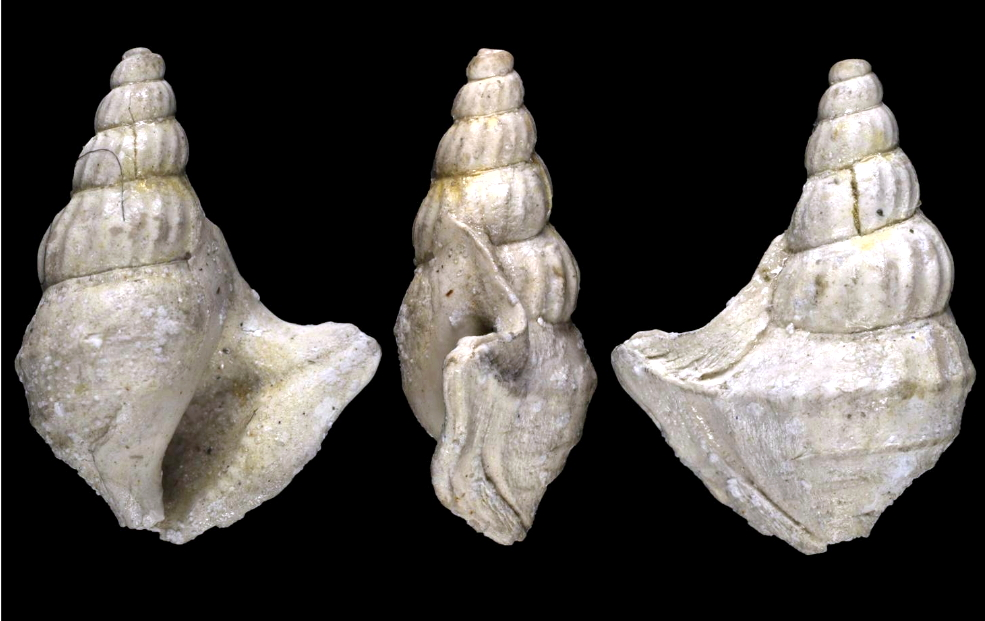
- Shell of Arrhoges occidentalis (fossil specimen at MNHN, Paris)

Scientific classification
- Kingdom: Animalia
- Phylum: Mollusca
- Class: Gastropoda
- Subclass: Caenogastropoda
- Order: Littorinimorpha
- Family: Aporrhaidae
- Genus: Arrhoges; Gabb, 1868

Type species
- Rostellaria occidentalis H. Beck, 1836

Synonyms
- † Aporrhais (Arrhoges) Gabb, 1868 superseded rank

= Arrhoges =

Genus of gastropods

Arrhoges is a genus of medium-sized sea snails, marine gastropod mollusks in the family Aporrhaidae and the superfamily Stromboidea.

== Description ==
(Original description) The shell is fusiform. The anterior canal is nearly obsolete, and there is no posterior canal. The outer lip is expanded and simple.

== Species ==
This genus contains the following species:

- † Arrhoges granocarinatus Traub, 1938
- † Arrhoges montensis É. Vincent, 1930
- Arrhoges occidentalis (Beck, 1836)
- † Arrhoges paleocaenica Rosenkrantz, 1970
- † Arrhoges pauperatus (A. d'Orbigny, 1843)

Synonyms

- † Arrhoges haastianus Wilckens, 1922: synonym of † Struthioptera haastiana (Wilckens, 1922)
