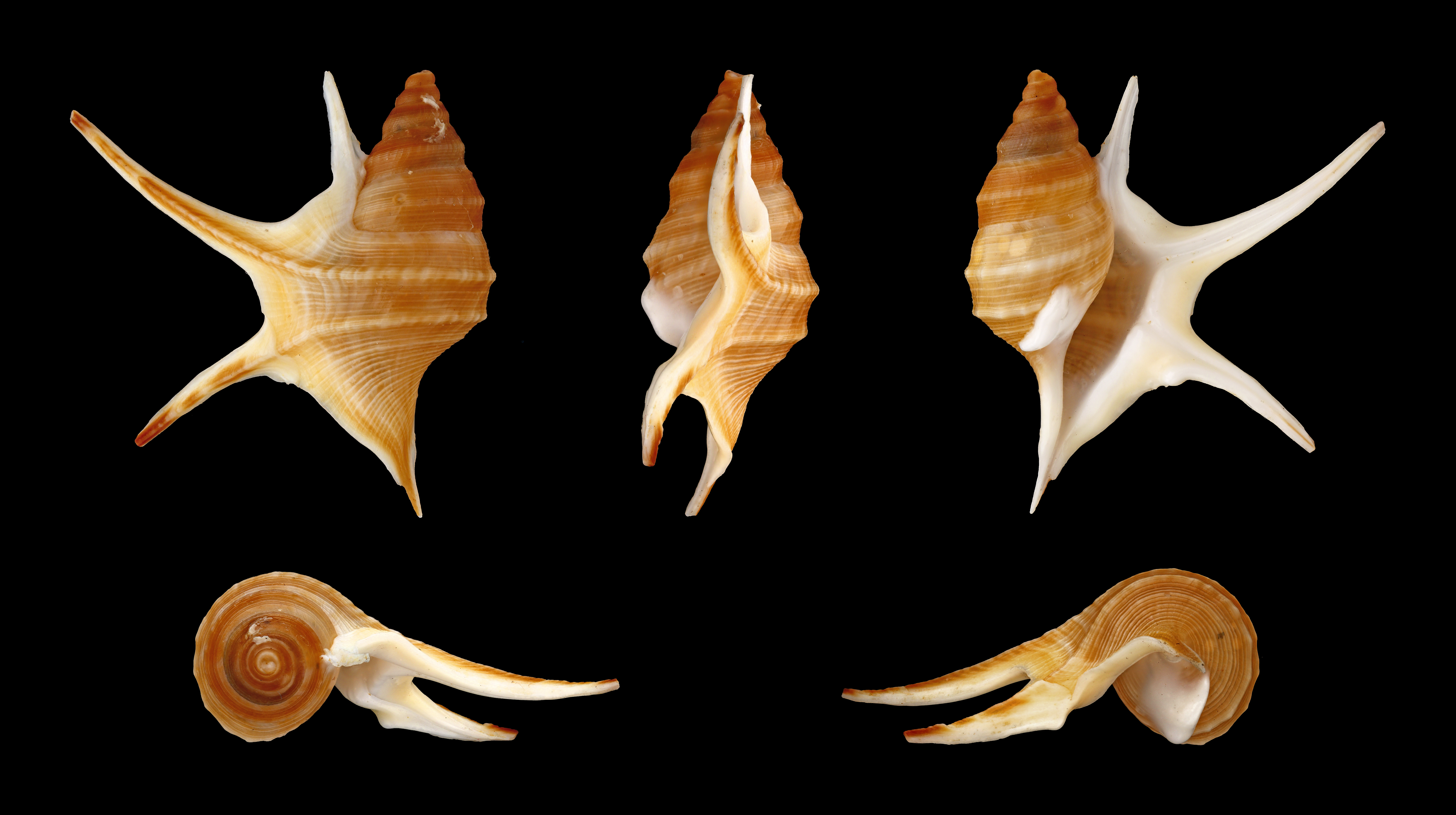

Scientific classification
- Kingdom: Animalia
- Phylum: Mollusca
- Class: Gastropoda
- Subclass: Caenogastropoda
- Order: Littorinimorpha
- Family: Aporrhaidae
- Genus: Aporrhais
- Species: A. pesgallinae

Binomial name
- Aporrhais pesgallinae Barnard, 1963

Synonyms
- Aporrhais pes-gallinae Barnard, 1963 (hyphen not acceptable in specific epithet)

= Aporrhais pesgallinae =

Species of gastropod

Aporrhais pesgallinae is a species of medium-sized sea snail, a marine gastropod mollusc in the family Aporrhaidae, the pelican's foot snails or pelican's foot shells.

== Distribution ==
Found along the coast of West Africa (Senegal, Ivory Coast, Guinea) and in the South Atlantic Ocean (off Angola, Namibia).
