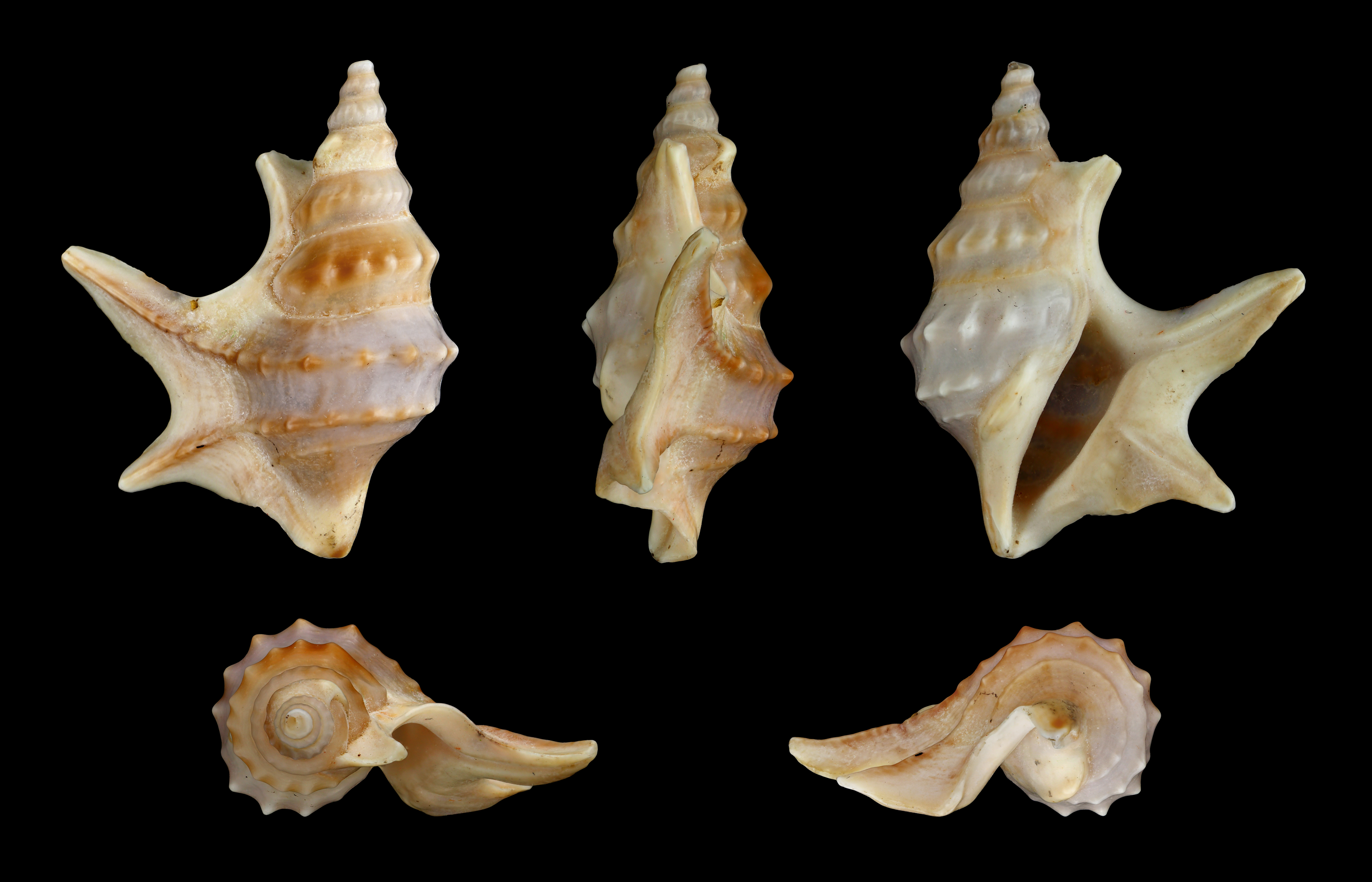
- Five views of a shell of Aporrhais pespelicani
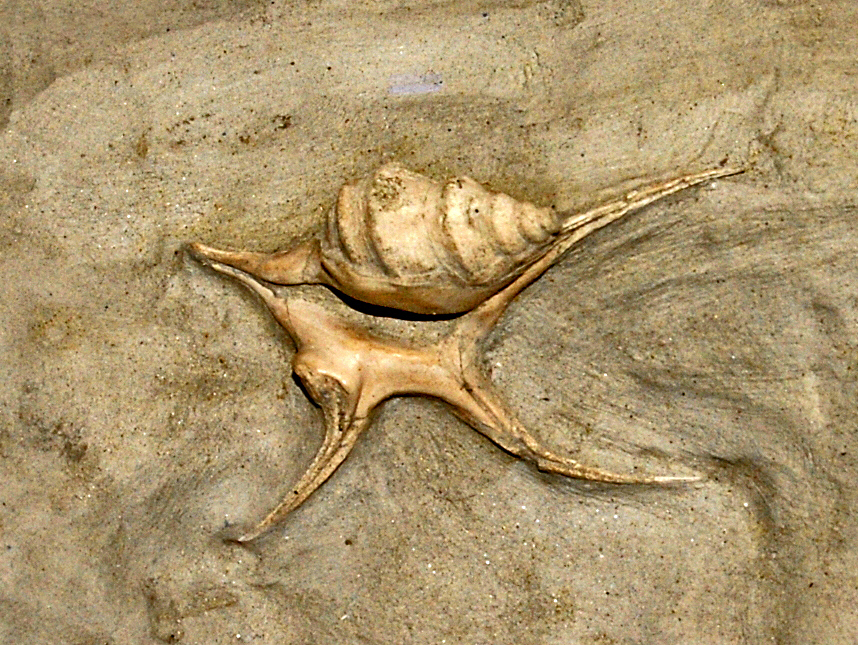
- Fossil shell of Aporrhais uttingeriana from Pliocene of Italy

Scientific classification
- Kingdom: Animalia
- Phylum: Mollusca
- Class: Gastropoda
- Subclass: Caenogastropoda
- Order: Littorinimorpha
- Superfamily: Stromboidea
- Family: Aporrhaidae
- Genus: Aporrhais da Costa, 1778

Type species
- Aporrhais quadrifidus da Costa, 1778

Synonyms
- Aporhais [sic] misspelling - incorrect subsequent spelling; Chenopus Philippi, 1836; Chenopus (Aporrhais) da Costa, 1778 superseded rank

= Aporrhais =

Aporrhais Temporal range: 205.6–0 Ma Latest Triassic (Rhaetian) - Present

Genus of gastropods

Aporrhais is a genus of medium-sized sea snails, marine gastropod mollusks in the family Aporrhaidae and the superfamily Stromboidea.

The genus is known from the Triassic to the Recent periods (age range: 205.6 to 0.0 million years ago). Fossils of species within this genus have been found all over the world.

== Species ==
This genus contains the following species: Aporrhais alata (Eichwald, 1830)

- † Aporrhais analoga (Deshayes, 1865)
- † Aporrhais arabica Abbass, 1977
- † Aporrhais biangulata (Meek & Hayden, 1856)
- † Aporrhais callosa (Telegdi-Roth, 1914) †
- † Aporrhais clarendonensis Wrigley, 1938
- † Aporrhais cornuta Korobkov, 1949
- † Aporrhais cornutus (Alekseev, 1963)
- † Aporrhais dactylifera (O. Boettger, 1902)
- †Aporrhais dingdenensis Marquet 2002
- † Aporrhais dispar (Deshayes, 1865)
- † Aporrhais drachuki Saul, 1998
- Aporrhais elegantissima Parenzan, 1970
- † Aporrhais etrusca Brunetti & Forli, 2013
- † Aporrhais gracilis Koenen, 1885
- † Aporrhais haeringensis (Gümbel, 1861)
- † Aporrhais heberti (Deshayes, 1865)
- † Aporrhais hupei (Mayer, 1857)
- † Aporrhais meridionalis (Basterot, 1825)
- † Aporrhais monodactylus K. Martin, 1884
- † Aporrhais peralata (Sacco, 1893)
- Aporrhais pesgallinae Barnard, 1963
- Aporrhais pespelecani (Linnaeus, 1758), common pelican's foot
- † Aporrhais pliorara (Sacco, 1893)
- † Aporrhais proalata (Sacco, 1893)
- † Aporrhais pugens Wollemann 1908
- Aporrhais senegalensis Gray, 1838
- Aporrhais serresiana (Michaud, 1828)
- † Aporrhais siberica Wieneke & Trubin, 2024
- † Aporrhais sowerbii (J. Fleming, 1828)
- † Aporrhais speciosa Schlotheim 1820
- † Aporrhais uttingeriana (Risso, 1826)
- † Aporrhais volkovi Zhizhchenko, 1959

== Synonyms ==
- † Aporrhais alatus (Eichwald, 1830) : synonym of † Aporrhais alata (Eichwald, 1830) (incorrect grammatical agreement of specific epithet)
- Aporrhais aldrovandi Capellini, 1860: synonym of Aporrhais pespelecani (Linnaeus, 1758)
- † Aporrhais angulata Gabb, 1864: synonym of † Anchura angulata (Gabb, 1864)
- † Aporrhais castexi Magne, 1952: synonym of † Aporrhais meridionalis (Basterot, 1825) (junior subjective synonym)
- † Aporrhais conemenosi Monterosato, 1890: synonym of Aporrhais pespelecani (Linnaeus, 1758)
- † Aporrhais cornutus Korobkov, 1949: synonym of † Aporrhais cornuta Korobkov, 1949 (incorrect grammatical agreement of specific epithet)
- † Aporrhais decemlirata Conrad, 1858: synonym of † Graciliala decemlirata (Conrad, 1858) (superseded combination)
- † Aporrhais decoratus Locard, 1889: synonym of † Drepanochilus decoratus (Locard, 1889) (superseded combination)
- † Aporrhais ebrayi de Loriol, 1882: synonym of † Ceratosiphon ebrayi (de Loriol, 1882) (superseded combination)
- † Aporrhais falciformis Gabb, 1864: synonym of † Anchura falciformis (Gabb, 1864)
- Aporrhais francheti Rochebrune, 1883: synonym of Aporrhais senegalensis Gray, 1838
- †Aporrhais gregaria Wilckens, 1905: synonym of † Austroaporrhais gregaria (Wilckens, 1905) (superseded combination)
- † Aporrhais koeneni Grönwall & Harder, 1907: synonym of † Drepanochilus koeneni (Grönwall & Harder, 1907) (superseded combination)
- † Aporrhais longispina Andert, 1934: synonym of † Anchura longispina (Andert, 1934)
- Aporrhais macandreae Jeffreys, 1867: synonym of Aporrhais serresianus (Michaud, 1828)
- Aporrhais michaudi Locard, 1890: synonym of Aporrhais pespelecani (Linnaeus, 1758)
- † Aporrhais obtusa F.-J. Pictet & Campiche, 1864: synonym of † Drepanochilus obtusus (F.-J. Pictet & Campiche, 1864) (superseded combination)
- Aporrhais occidentalis Beck, 1836 : synonym of Arrhoges occidentalis (Beck, 1836)
- Aporrhais pelecanipes Locard, 1892: synonym of Aporrhais pespelecani (Linnaeus, 1758)
- † Aporrhais pescarbonis (Brongniart, 1823) sensu Forbes & Hanley, 1853: synonym of Aporrhais serresiana (Michaud, 1828) (misapplication, misapplication)
- Aporrhais pes-gallinae Barnard: synonym of Aporrhais pesgallinae Barnard, 1963
- Aporrhais pespelicani (Linnaeus, 1758): synonym of Aporrhais pespelecani (Linnaeus, 1758)
- Aporrhais quadrifidus da Costa, 1778: synonym of Aporrhais pespelecani (Linnaeus, 1758)
- Aporrhais sarsii Kobelt, 1908: synonym of Aporrhais serresianus (Michaud, 1828)
- Aporrhais serreseanus [sic]: synonym of Aporrhais serresianus (Michaud, 1828)
- † Aporrhais sublevis Meek & Hayden, 1860: synonym of † Drepanochilus sublevis (Meek & Hayden, 1860) (superseded combination)
- † Aporrhais tannenbergica Frič, 1897: synonym of † Latiala tannenbergica (Frič, 1897) (superseded combination)
- † Aporrhais vetus Packard, 1922: synonym of † Alarimella veta (Packard, 1922)
