= Édouard Piette =

French archaeologist

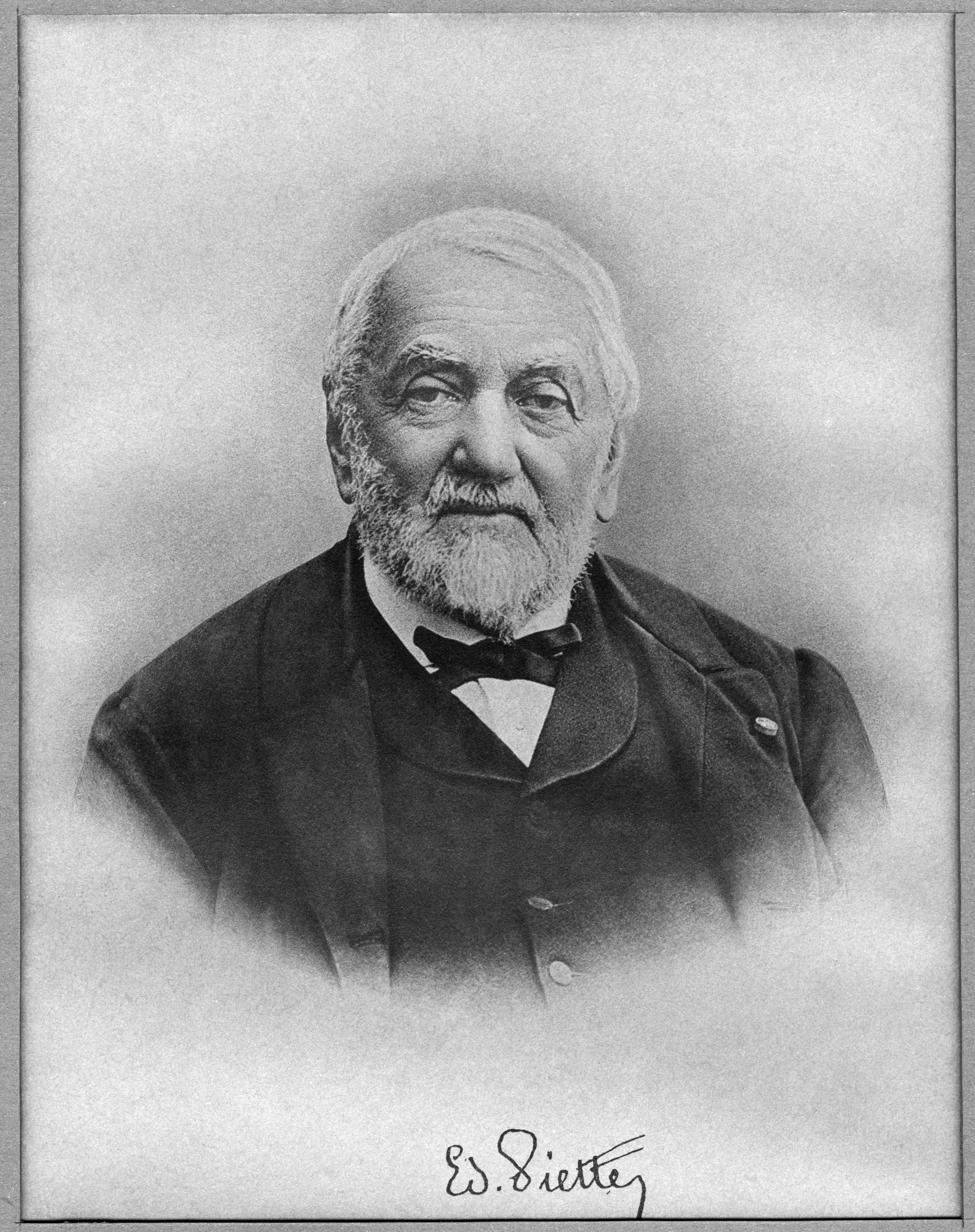
Édouard Piette

Édouard Louis Stanislas Piette (11 March 1827, Aubigny-les-Pothées – 5 June 1906, Rumigny) was a French archaeologist and prehistorian.

== Biography ==
A magistrate by vocation, at around the age of 28 he developed an interest in geology. He studied the limestone formations of northeastern France and its fossils, and through this research he subsequently made the acquaintance of paleontologist Édouard Lartet and other scientists. During a stay at the Bagnères-de-Luchon spa in the central Pyrenees, he became interested in the glacial geology of the area and the contents of its numerous caves.

During the 1880s and 1890s he performed archaeological work at various Paleolithic and Mesolithic sites in southwestern France. From his excavatory findings at Mas-d'Azil in 1887, he introduced the "Azilian culture" to bridge the space between the local Paleolithic and Mesolithic phases. Also, he proposed a subdivision of the French Paleolithic into the Amygdalithic, Niphetic and Glyptic phases, but the idea was not widely accepted by other archaeologists.

From his excavations in southwestern France, he found numerous objects of prehistoric art. Among his discoveries at the cavern of Mas-d'Azil was a statuette of a female carved from the tooth of an equine. At Grotte du Pape near Brassempouy, fragments of seven statuettes were uncovered, including the so-called Dame de Brassempouy. Piette was among the first to support the authenticity and antiquity of the Altamira cave art.

He served as president of the Société historique de haute-Picardie and was a member of the Société d'Anthropologie de Paris and the Société géologique de France.

In the field of paleontology he circumscribed Cuphosolenus (1876), a genus of extinct sea snails.

== Selected works ==
- Le lias inférieur de l'est de la France comprenant la Meurthe, la Moselle, le grand-duché de Luxembourg, la Belgique et la Meuse (with Olry Terquem), 1868 – The Lower Lias of eastern France, including Meurthe, Moselle, Luxembourg, Belgium and Meuse.
- Nomenclature des temps anthropiques primitifs, 1879 – Classification of primitive human epochs.
- Les subdivisions de l'époque magdalénienne et de l'époque néolithique, 1889 – Subdivisions of the Magdalenian and Neolithic epochs.
- L'époque éburnéenne et les races humaines de la période glyptique, 1894 – The Eburnean era and the human race of the Glyptic period.
- Une station sulistrienne à Gourdan, 1894.
- Les fouilles de Brassempouy en 1894 – Excavations at Brassempouy in 1894.
- Hiatus et lacune. Vestiges de la période de transition dans la grotte du Mas d'Azil, 1894 – Hiatus and gap. Remains from the transition period associated with the Mas-d'Azil cave
- La station de Brassempouy et les statuettes humaines de la période glyptique, 1895 – The Brassempouy site and human statuettes from the Glyptic period.
- Les galets coloriés du Mas d'Azil, 1896 – The colored pebbles of Mas-d'Azil.
- Gravure du Mas d'Azil et statuettes de Menton, 1902 – Engravings from Mas-d'Azil and the statuettes of Menton.
- Notions complémentaires sur l'Azilien, 1904 – Additional ideas regarding the Azilian culture.
- L'art pendant l'age du Renne. Album de cent planches, 1907 – Art from the Reindeer Age.

With epigraphist Julien Sacaze, he was co-author of La Montagne d'Espiaup (1877) and Les monuments de la montagne d'Espiaup (Pyrénées) (1878).
