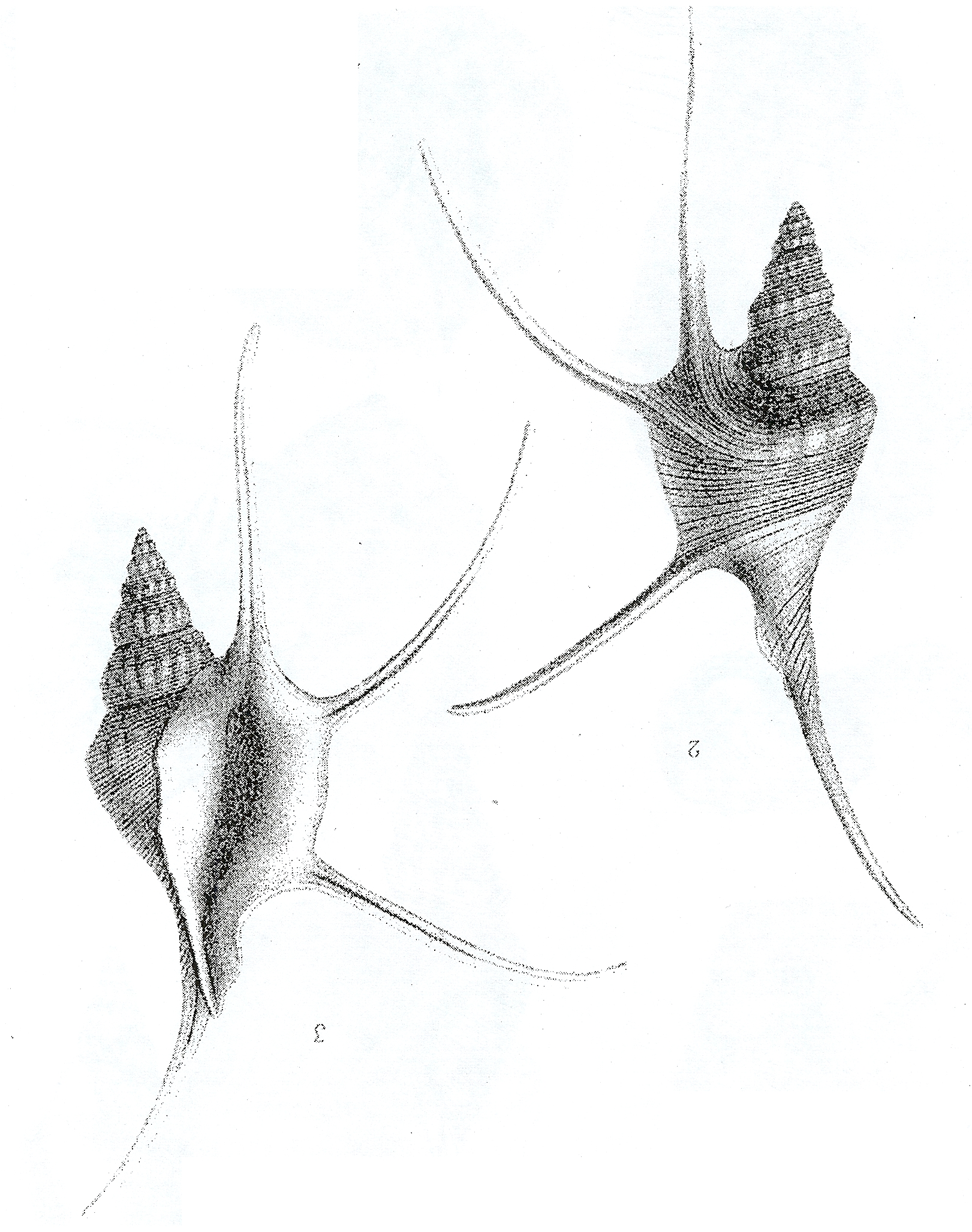
- Cuphosolenus tetracer (D'Orbigny) from France.

Scientific classification
- Kingdom: Animalia
- Phylum: Mollusca
- Class: Gastropoda
- Subclass: Caenogastropoda
- Order: Littorinimorpha
- Family: Aporrhaidae
- Genus: †Cuphosolenus; Piette, 1876

Species
- see text

= Cuphosolenus =

Cuphosolenus Temporal range: Jurassic–Cretaceous

Extinct genus of gastropods

Cuphosolenus is a genus of extinct small to medium-sized sea snails, marine gastropod mollusks in the family Aporrhaidae and the superfamily Stromboidea, known from the Jurassic and lower Cretaceous periods. Cuphosolenus was named by Edouard Piette in 1876.

== Etymology ==
Cuphosolenus is from the Greek Κυφός σωλήν, or "bent canal," referring to the curved anterior siphonal canal.

== Spelling ==
In 1887, Paul Fischer “emended” the spelling of the name to Cyphosolenus. In 1891, Piette accepted Fischer’s use of Cyphosolenus in the text of Paléontologie Française ou Description des Fossiles de la France, etc., Vol. III (text), p. 376 ff. This change in spelling has been described as an unjustified emendation under the rules of the International Code of Zoological Nomenclature and scientists today generally call the genus Cuphosolenus, following the original spelling.

== Description ==
The genus includes Aporrhaidae shells with three long, thin finger-like extensions from the aperture and an extended, curved siphonal canal. The original description described the shell as having (translation from the French), "a semi-palmate lip, three digits, the posterior one of which is weakly attached to the spire, inner lip of columella thick, and siphonal canal bent or curved at the end". The type species for the genus is Cuphosolenus tetracer (D'Orbigny).

== Distribution ==
Cuphosolenus has been reported from the Jurassic of France, the Sinai, and questionably from Saudi Arabia, as well as the lower Cretaceous of Texas and Mexico. In his 1891 work, Piette included descriptions of 16 species of Cuphosolenus from the Jurassic of France.

== Species ==
The following species have been described as belonging (or possibly belonging = "?") to Cuphosolenus:

=== Jurassic species ===
- Cuphosolenus anguilcostatus Buvignier 1852
- Cuphosolenus barrensis Buvignier 1891
- Cuphosolenus (?) beaumonti (Guirand & Ogérien 1869)
- Cuphosolenus (?) calvus (Contejean 1858)
- Cuphosolenus deshayeseus (Buvignier 1852)
- Cuphosolenus deslongchampsianus Buvingier 1891
- Cuphosolenus dyoniseus (Buvignier 1852) photo
- Cuphosolenus fusoides (Dolfus 1863)
- Cuphosolenus galateae (D'Orbigny 1847)
- Cuphosolenus gaulardeus (Buvignier 1852)
- Cuphosolenus johannae Buvignier 1891
- Cuphosolenus matronensis (DeLoriol 1871)
- Cuphosolenus (?) sphinx Piette, 1882
- Cuphosolenus tenuistriatus (Buvignier 1852) photo
- Cuphosolenus tetracer (D'Orbigny 1825) - type species. images
- Cuphosolenus theodoriensis Buvignier 1891

=== Cretaceous species ===
- Cuphosolenus mexicanus (Kellum & Appelt, 1964) text include original description
- Cuphosolenus nuecensis (Stanton, 1947)
- Cuphosolenus tarrantensis (Stanton, 1947) 3D photo
