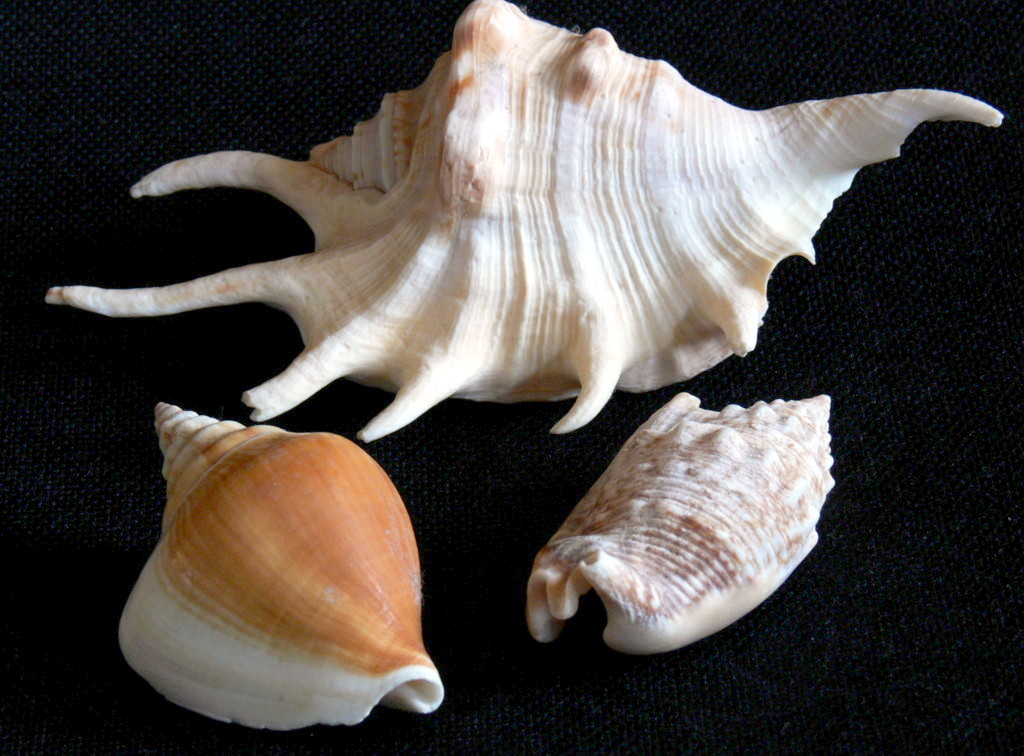
- Three shells of species in the Stromboidea

Scientific classification
- Kingdom: Animalia
- Phylum: Mollusca
- Class: Gastropoda
- Subclass: Caenogastropoda
- Order: Littorinimorpha
- Superfamily: Stromboidea; Rafinesque, 1815

Families
- See text

= Stromboidea =

Superfamily of gastropods

The Stromboidea, originally named the Strombacea by Rafinesque in 1815, is a superfamily of medium-sized to very large sea snails in the order Littorinimorpha.

== Morphology ==
=== Shell ===
Stromboideans have medium to large shells, attaining a wide variety of lengths depending on the species (20–400 mm from the smallest aporrhaids to the largest strombids). A stromboidean shell has a medium (e.g. spider conchs, Lambis spp.) to high spire (e.g. tibias, Tibia spp.), and a thickened and frequently expanded outer lip (e.g. the queen conch, Lobatus gigas, or the goliath conch, Lobatus goliath) that may be ornamented by long spines (e.g. the spider conch, Lambis chiragra, common pelican foot, Aporrhais spp.) or digitations (e.g. the millipede spider conch, Lambis millepeda). The anterior portion of the outer lip may present a stromboid notch, an indentation through which one of the animal's long eyestalks may protrude.

The shell morphology of some stromboideans (e.g. Lobatus gigas) is not solely determined by the animal's genes; environmental conditions such as location, diet, temperature and depth, and biological interactions such as predation, can greatly affect it. Juvenile individuals of some species develop heavier shells when exposed to predators. They also develop wider and thicker shells with fewer but longer spines in deeper water.

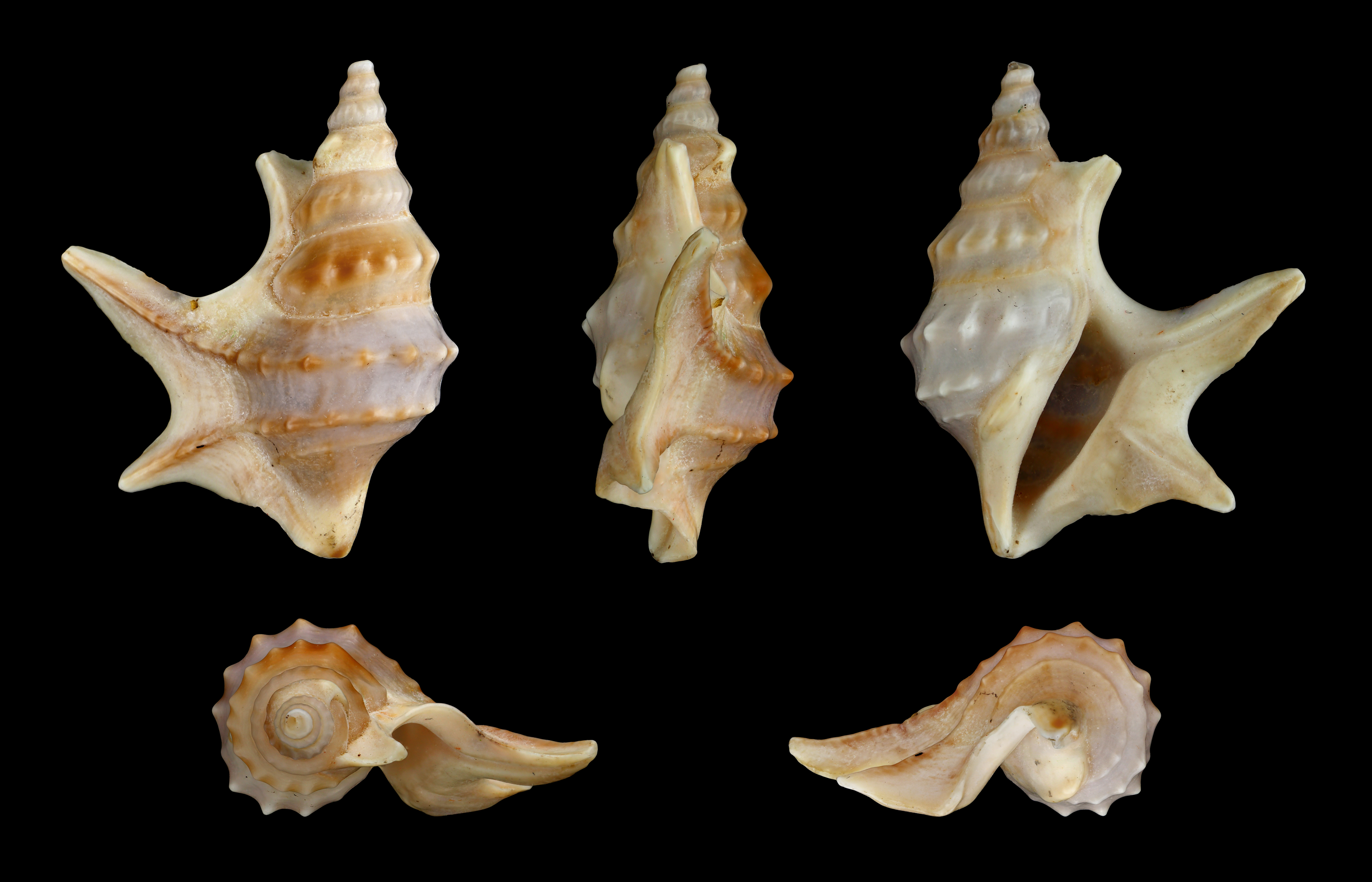
Five views of a shell of Aporrhais pespelecani, a species in the family Aporrhaidae

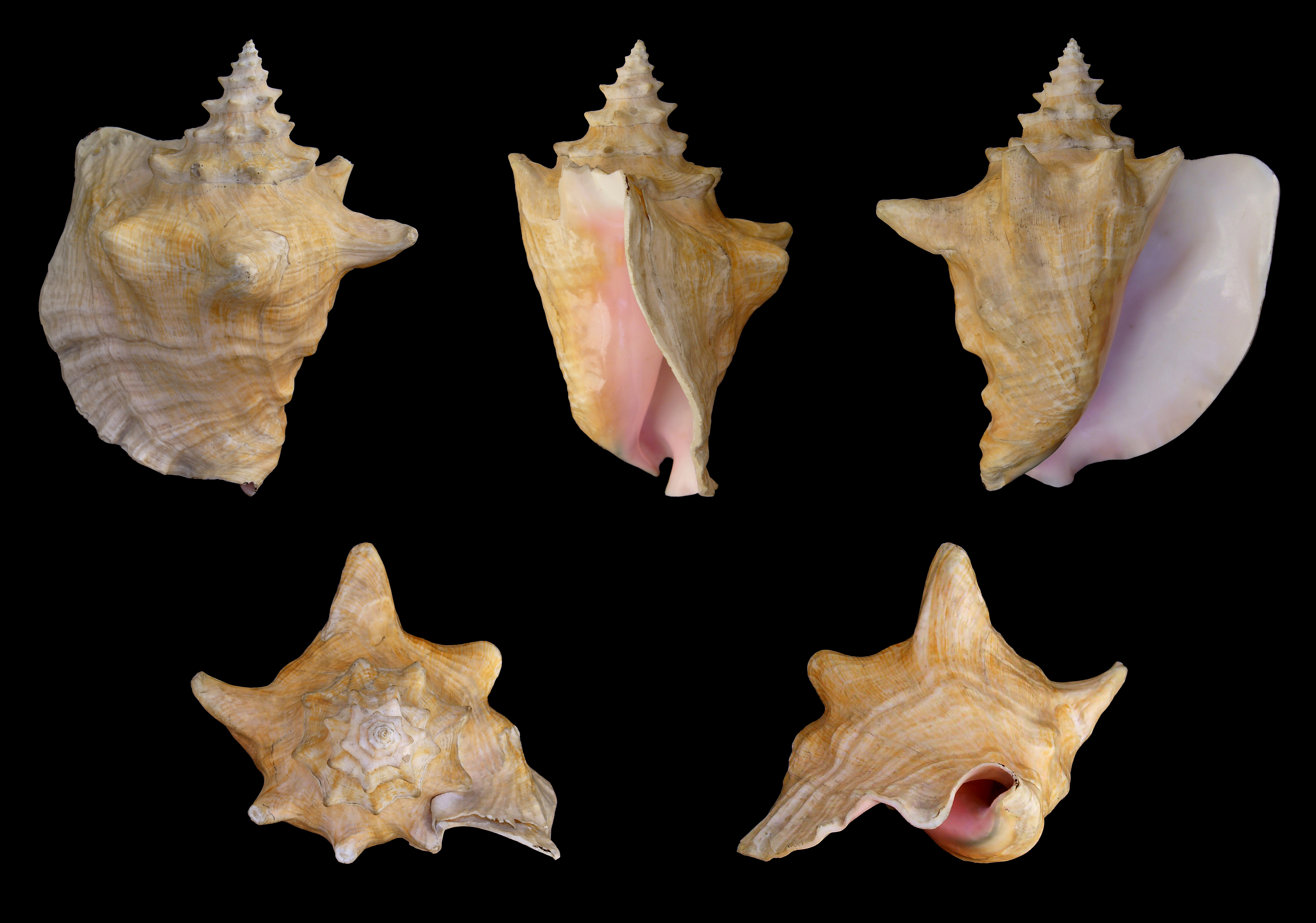
Five views of a shell of Lobatus gigas, a species in the family Strombidae

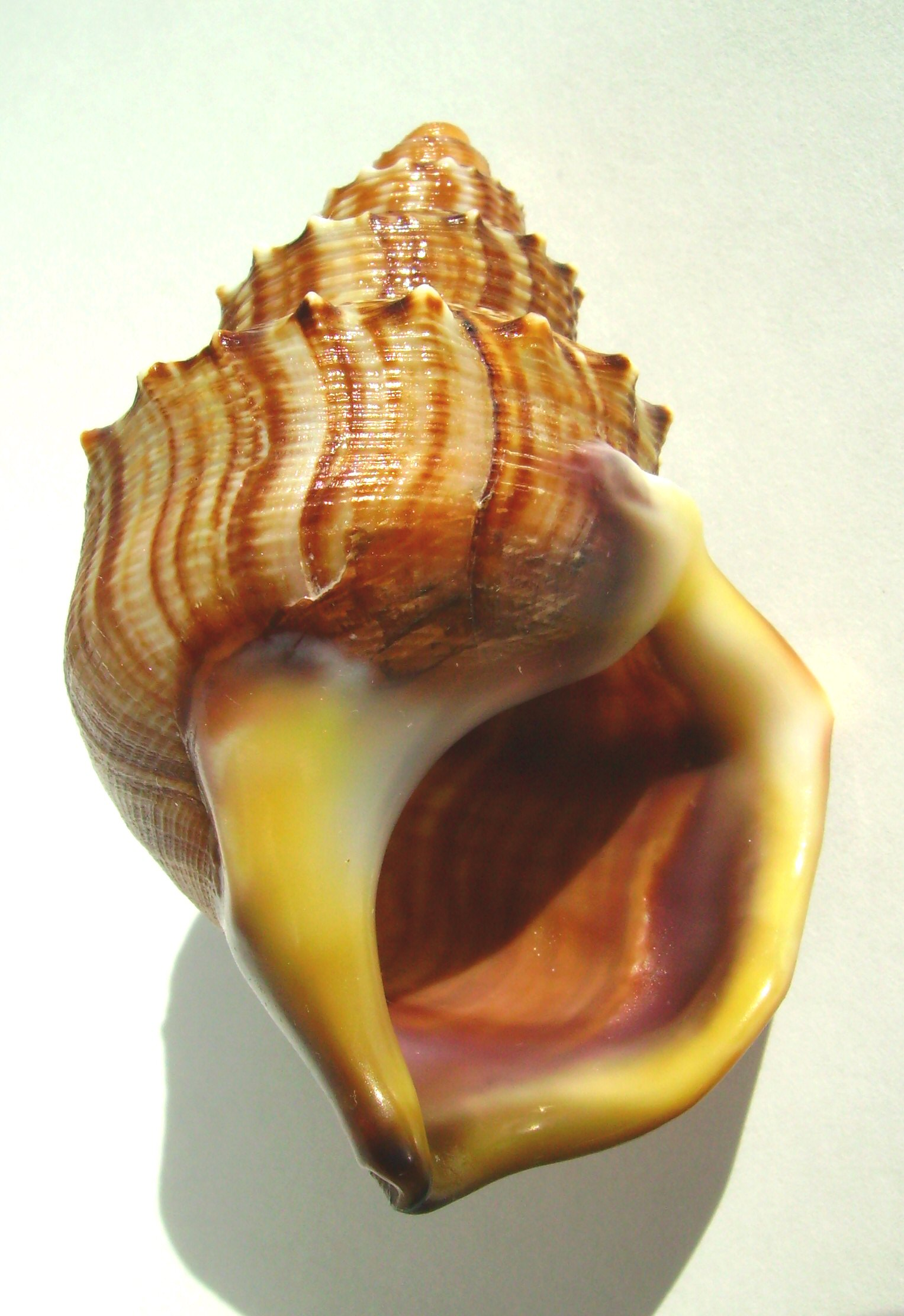
Struthiolaria papulosa, a species in the family Struthiolariidae

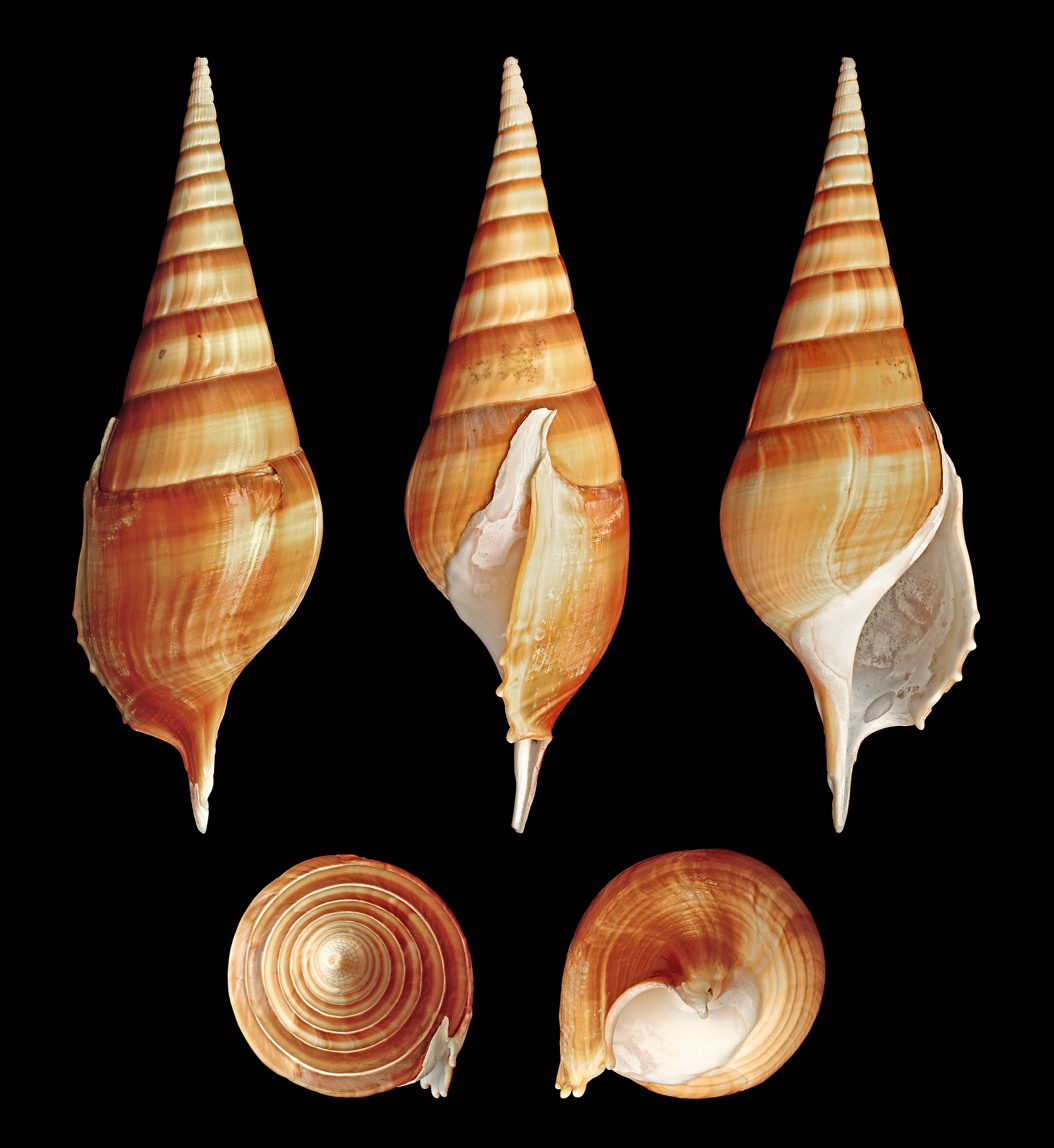
Five views of a shell of Tibia insulaechorab, a species in the family Rostellariidae

== Taxonomy ==
This superfamily was previously known as Strombacea. Prior to the recent ruling by the ICZN, multiple invertebrate superfamily names ended in the suffix -acea, or -aceae, not -oidea as now required according to ICZN article 29.2. The suffix -oidea used to be used for some subclasses and superorders, where it is still found. In much of the older literature including Keen 1958, Moore and colleagues 1952, and the Treatise on Invertebrate Paleontology, gastropod superfamilies are written with the suffix -acea.

=== 2005 taxonomy ===
According to the classification proposed by Bouchet & Rocroi (2005), the families and subfamilies in the superfamily Stromboidea are as follows. Fossil families are marked with a dagger †.

- Aporrhaidae Gray, 1850 - the pelican's foot shells, synonyms: Aporrhaididae, Aporrhaiidae,
  - Subfamily Aporrhainae Gray, 1850
  - Subfamily Arrhoginae Popenoe, 1983
  - † Subfamily Harpagodinae Pchelintsev, 1963
  - † Subfamily Perissopterinae Korotkov, 1992
  - † Subfamily Spinigerinae Korotkov, 1992 (inv.)
- † Colombellinidae P. Fischer, 1884
- † Pugnellidae Kiel & Bandel, 1999
- Seraphsidae Gray, 1853 - synonym: Terebellidae
- Strombidae Rafinesque, 1815 - the "true conchs"
- Struthiolariidae Gabb, 1868
- † Thersiteidae Savornin, 1915
- † Tylostomatidae Stoliczka, 1868

=== 2008 taxonomy ===
Some authors consider two following families as separate families:

- Rimellidae
- Rostellariidae - synonym: Tibiidae

== Phylogeny ==
- Struthiolariidae
  - Struthiolaria papulosa
  - Tylospira scutulata
- - Cuphosolenus serresianus
  - - - Aporrhais occidentalis
      - Aporrhais pespelecani
    - - Xenophoridae
        - Xenophora conchyliophora
        - - Onustus caribaeus
          - Onustus indicus
      - Strombidae ►

Phylogeny and relationships of Stromboidea according to Simone (2005)

The phylogenetic relationships among the Stromboidea have been addressed in 2005, by Simone. The author proposed a cladogram (a tree of descent) based on an extensive morpho-anatomical analysis of representatives of Aporrhaidae, Strombidae, Xenophoridae and Struthiolariidae.

In his analysis, Simone recognized Strombidae as a monophyletic taxon supported by 13 synapomorphies (traits that are shared by two or more taxa and their most recent common ancestor), with at least eight distinct genera. He considered the genus Terebellum as the most basal taxon, distinguished from the remaining strombids by 13 synapomorphies, including a rounded foot. Though the genus Tibia was left out of the analysis, Simone regarded it as probably closely related to Terebellum, apparently due to some well known morphological similarities between them.

== Ecology and behavior ==
Stromboideans are exclusively marine, and most species inhabit shallow waters. Adult individuals may be epifaunal, remaining partially buried in the sand or never burying at all (e.g. Strombidae), but may also be infaunal, remaining buried for most of their lifetime (Struthiolariidae).

=== Feeding habits ===
Herbivory is the most common feeding habit among stromboideans. Snails in the family Strombidae were widely accepted as carnivores by several authors in the 19th century, a concept that persisted until the first half of the 20th century. This erroneous idea evidently originated in the writings of Jean-Baptiste Lamarck, who classified strombids with other supposedly carnivorous snails. This idea was subsequently repeated by other authors, but were not supported by observation. Nowadays, strombids are known to be specialized herbivores and occasional detritivores. They are usually associated with shallow water reefs and seagrass meadows.

Struthiolariids are ciliary mucous feeders, obtaining their nutrition from particles and organic matter suspended in the water. While remaining completely buried in the sand, struthiolariids are connected to the surface by two artificially produced holes. These holes are made by the animal's proboscis, held in place with mucus, and are used for inhalating and exhalating water. Feeding particles are captured as the inhaled water flows over the animal's gills, become embedded in mucus, and are moved along a ciliary tract that leads to the animal's mouth, where they are finally ingested.
