= Digitolabrum =

Digitolabrum Temporal range: 40.4–37.2 Ma

Scientific classification
- Kingdom: Animalia
- Phylum: Mollusca
- Class: Gastropoda
- Subclass: Caenogastropoda
- Order: Littorinimorpha
- Family: Aporrhaidae
- Genus: †Digitolabrum; Cossmann, 1904

Species
- †Digitolabrum abedi; †Digitolabrum blaviensis; †Digitolabrum elegans (Cuvillier, 1930) (syn. Chenopus elegans Cuvillier, 1930); †Digitolabrum gracilidigitatis; †Digitolabrum princeps (Vasseur); †Digitolabrum zigni (de Gregorio, 1880)

Extinct genus of gastropods

Digitolabrum is an extinct genus of sea snails in the family Aporrhaidae. Most species are from the Eocene of France. D. abedi and D. elegans are from the Eocene of Egypt.

== See also ==
- List of marine gastropod genera in the fossil record
