= Julien Sacaze =

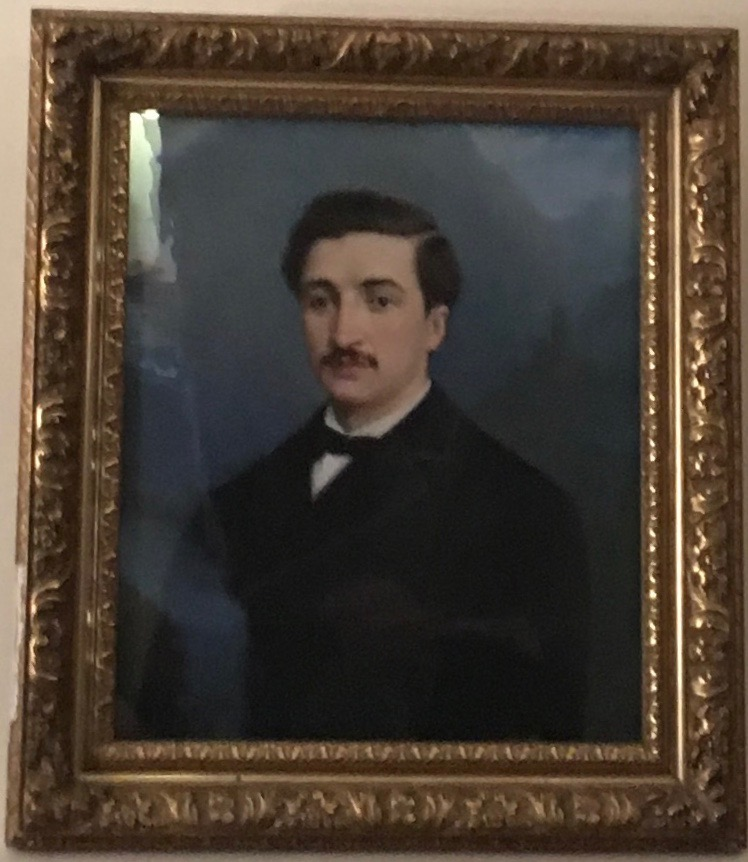
Portrait of Julien Sacaze at the Musée du Pays de Luchon

Julien-Etienne-Léopold Sacaze (24 September 1847, Saint-Gaudens – 20 November 1889) was a French lawyer, historian and archaeologist known for his epigraphic investigations of the Pyrenees region.

He studied philosophy and theology at the seminar of Issy and studied law in Toulouse. In 1872 he became a practicing lawyer in his hometown of Saint-Gaudens, later earning distinctions as secretary of the conseil de l'Ordre (1877) and as bâtonnier (1888).

With prehistorian Édouard Piette, he conducted several archaeological excavations in the Pyrenees. In 1875, the two men uncovered cromlechs (megalithic structures) at Mount Espiau, and later discovered tumuli at the plateau of Lannemezan (1877–78) as well as an early Iron Age sépultures à incinération, found at the plain of Rivière, located southwest of Saint-Gaudens. In 1879 the two men excavated a Gallo-Roman cemetery at Garin.

In 1885 he was a founding member of the Société des études du Comminges (1885). An academic association in Bagnères-de-Luchon known as the Académie Julien Sacaze is named after him.

== Published works ==
His work on ancient inscriptions of the Pyrenees was published posthumously in 1892 with the title, Les inscriptions antiques des Pyrénées. His other historical and epigraphical works associated with Pyrenees include:

- L'épigraphie de Luchon (1880) – The epigraphy of Luchon.
- Les anciens dieux des Pyrénées (1885) – The ancient gods of the Pyrenees.
- Inscriptions antiques du Couserans (1892) – Ancient inscriptions of Couserans.
