= Colombellinidae =

Scientific classification
- Kingdom: Animalia
- Phylum: Mollusca
- Class: Gastropoda
- Subclass: Caenogastropoda
- Order: Littorinimorpha
- Superfamily: Stromboidea
- Family: †Colombellinidae; P. Fischer, 1884

Extinct family of gastropods

Colombellinidae is an extinct family of fossil sea snails, marine gastropod molluscs in the clade Littorinimorpha.
