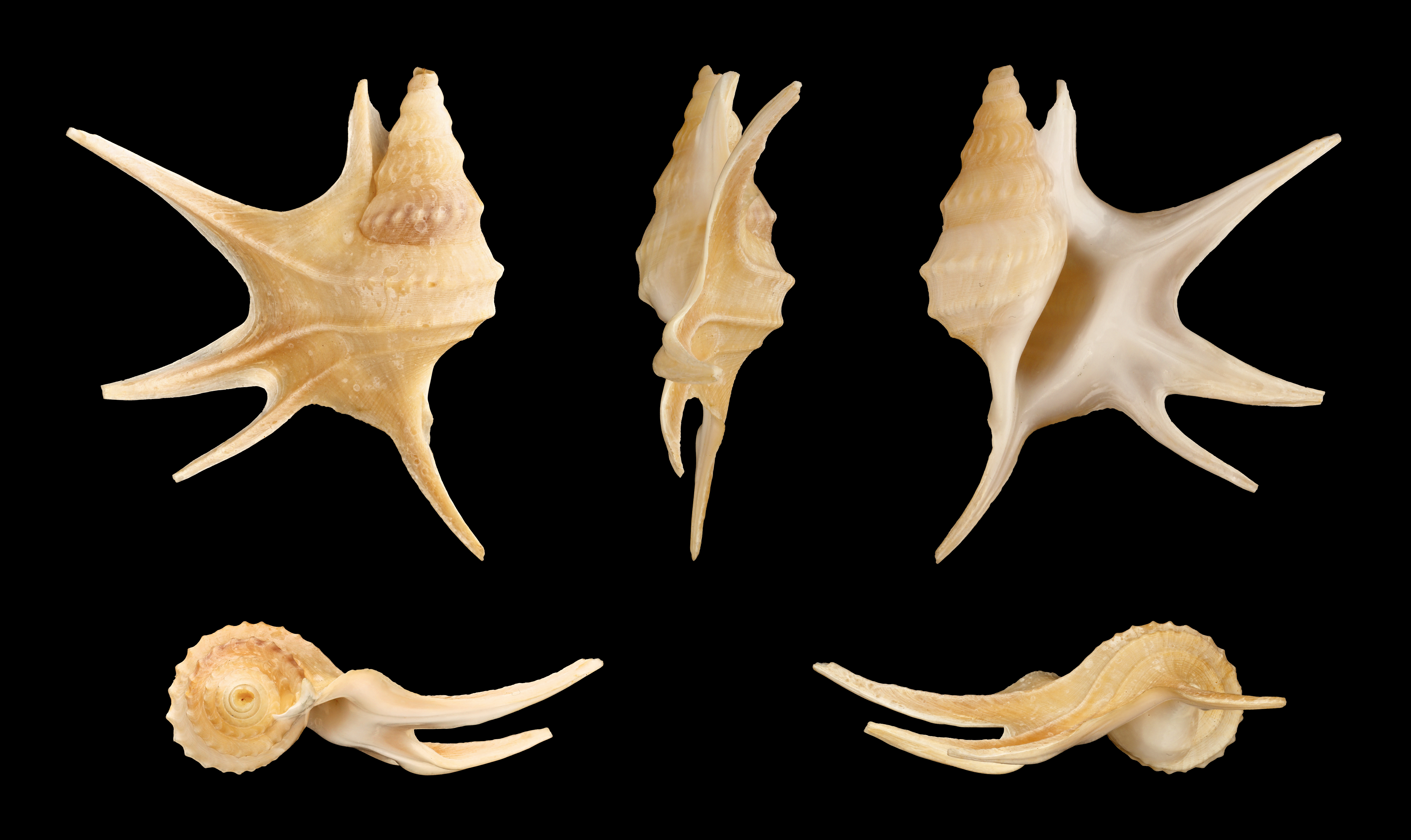
- Five views of a shell of A. serresiana

Scientific classification
- Kingdom: Animalia
- Phylum: Mollusca
- Class: Gastropoda
- Subclass: Caenogastropoda
- Order: Littorinimorpha
- Family: Aporrhaidae
- Genus: Aporrhais
- Species: A. serresiana

Binomial name
- Aporrhais serresiana (Michaud, 1828)

Synonyms
- Aporrhais macandreae Jeffreys, 1867; Aporrhais michaudi Locard, 1891; Aporrhais sarsii Kobelt, 1908; Aporrhais serreseanus [sic]; Aporrhais serreseanus hexapodus Nordsieck, 1968; Aporrhais serresianus var. crassa Locard, 1891; Aporrhais serresianus var. minor Locard, 1891; Aporrhais serresianus var. ventricosa Locard, 1891; Chenopus serresianus; Rostellaria serresiana Michaud, 1828

= Aporrhais serresiana =

Species of gastropod

Aporrhais serresiana is a species of medium-sized sea snail, a marine gastropod mollusk in the family Aporrhaidae, the pelican's foot snails or pelican's foot shells.

== Description ==
Shell size 40-50 mm.

(original description in Latin) The shell is small, turreted, and imperforate, with a yellowish-white coloration. The surface is covered with spiral striations. The upper whorls feature a single, central keel, while the body whorl is strongly defined by three keels. These keels are nodulose and extend to form the digitate (finger-like) processes on the outer lip. The outer lip is expanded and boasts four distinct, channeled lobes (or "fingers"). The siphonal canal (rostrum) is very long, straight, thin, and sharp. The aperture is constricted.

== Distribution ==
Mediterranean Sea, Morocco.
