= Olry Terquem (paleontologist) =

French geologist, pharmacist and paleontologist

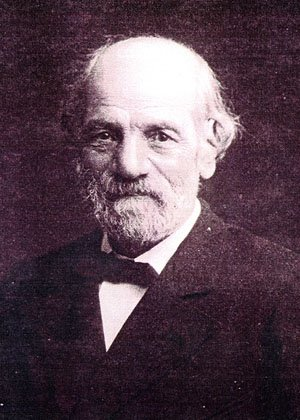
Olry Terquem

Olry Terquem (26 September 1797 in Metz – 19 June 1887 in Paris) was a French pharmacist and paleontologist. He was a nephew of mathematician Olry Terquem (1782–1862).

Up until 1822 he studied pharmacy in Paris, and afterwards returned as a pharmacist to his hometown of Metz. From 1833 he taught classes in industrial chemistry at the École Centrale in Metz. In 1852 he sold his pharmacy and devoted all his time to geology and paleontology. Due to consequences of the Franco-Prussian War, he moved to Paris, where he established a paleontology laboratory. In Paris, he worked on the classification of Alcide d'Orbigny's foraminifera collections.

From 1845 to 1865 he conducted extensive stratigraphic and paleontological investigations of the Lorraine region, Luxembourg and the Ardennes. In the mid-1850s, during the construction of railway lines in Moselle, he discovered well preserved foraminifera fossils. He is also remembered for characterizing what would subsequently be known as the Hettangian strata, the earliest stage of the Jurassic period. In 1864 Eugène Renevier proposed the term "Hettangian", named after the community of Hettange-Grande in Moselle (its stratotype being a nearby quarry).

He was a member of numerous learned societies, including the Société géologique de France (from 1850). He also worked as a curator in the geology section of the Metz museum. Species with the epithet of terquemi commemorate his name, an example being the foraminiferan Neoconorbina terquemi (Rzehak, 1888).

== Selected works ==
- Paléontologie de l'étage inférieur de la formation Liasique de la province de Luxembourg (Grand duché) et de Hettange, département de la Moselle, (1855) – Paleontology of the lower stage of the Liassic formation in Luxembourg and in Hettange, Moselle.
- Recherches sur les Foraminiferes, 1860.
- Mémoire sur les Foraminifères du Lias du département de la Moselle ... Nos. 1-6, (1858–66) – On the Lias foraminifera of Moselle.
- Mémoire sur les foraminifères du système oolithique : ètude du fullers-earthe de la Moselle ... Nos. 1-3, (1867–70) – On the foraminifera of the Oolitic system.
- Le lias inférieur de l'est de la France comprenant la Meurthe, la Moselle, le grand-duché de Luxembourg, la Belgique et la Meuse (with Édouard Piette; 1868) – The Lower Lias of eastern France, including Meurthe, Moselle, Luxembourg, Belgium and Meuse.
- Les foraminifères de l'éocène des environs de Paris, (1882) – The foraminifera of the Eocene near Paris.
