= Thersiteidae =

Scientific classification
- Kingdom: Animalia
- Phylum: Mollusca
- Class: Gastropoda
- Subclass: Caenogastropoda
- Order: Littorinimorpha
- Superfamily: Stromboidea
- Family: †Thersiteidae; Savornin, 1915

Extinct family of gastropods

Thersiteidae is an extinct family of fossil sea snails, marine gastropod molluscs in the superfamily Stromboidea, the true conchs and their allies.

== Genera ==
- † Hemithersitea Savornin, 1914
- † Oostrombus Sacco, 1893
- † Orthaulax Gabb, 1873
- † Pseudothersitea Savornin, 1914
- † Thersitea Coquand, 1862
