= Aubigny-les-Pothées =

- Commune
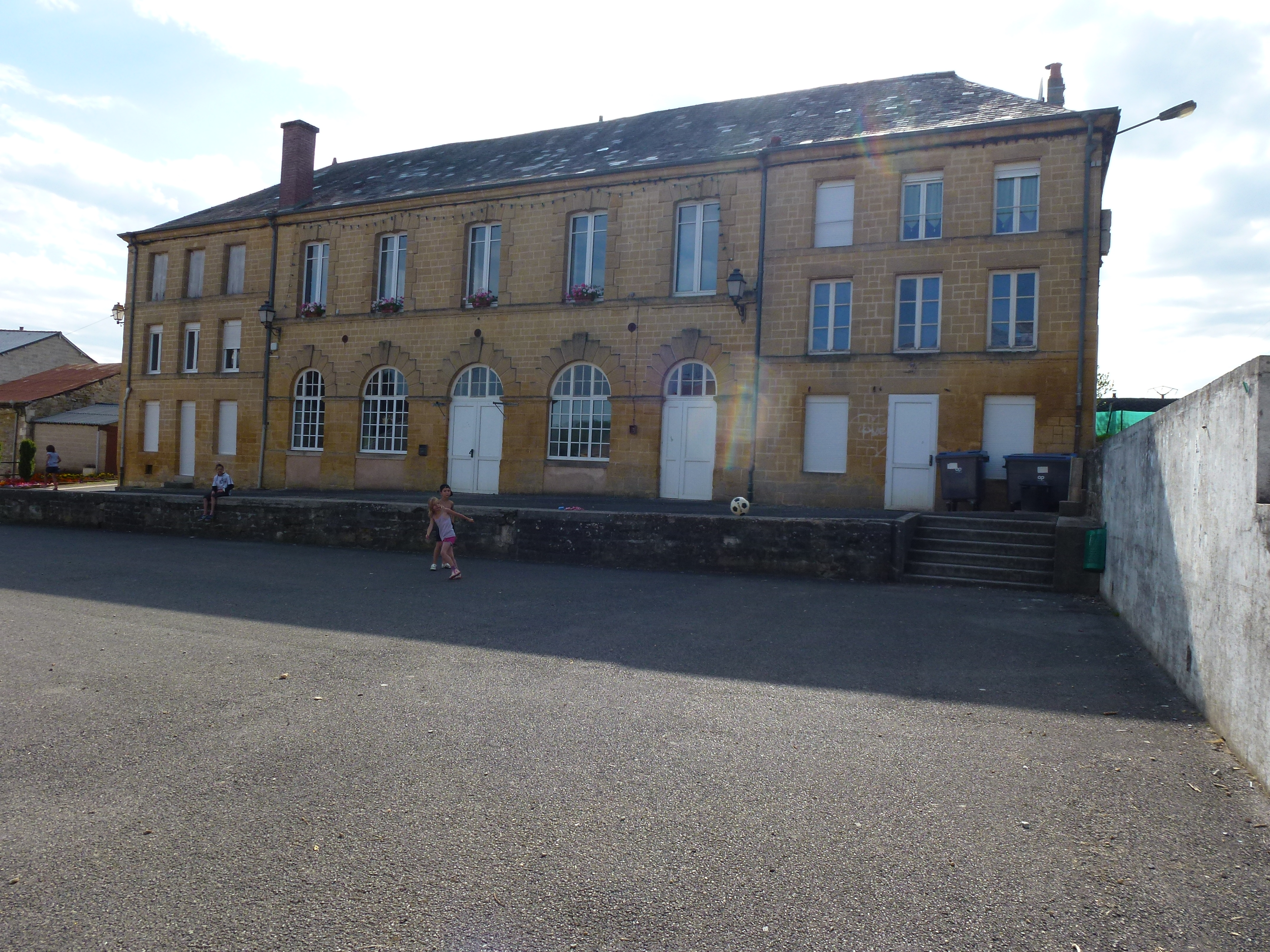
- The School

- Coat of arms
- Location of Aubigny-les-Pothées
- Location within France Location within Grand Est
- Coordinates: 49°46′37″N 4°26′12″E
- Country: France
- Region: Grand Est
- Department: Ardennes
- Arrondissement: Charleville-Mézières
- Canton: Signy-l'Abbaye
- Intercommunality: CC Ardennes Thiérache

Government
  - Mayor (2020–2026): Alain Malherbe
- Area^{1}: 10.42 km^{2} (4.02 sq mi)
- Highest elevation: 294 m (965 ft)
- Lowest elevation: 177 m (581 ft)
- Population (2023): 306
  - Density: 29.4/km^{2} (76.1/sq mi)
- Time zone: UTC+01:00 (CET)
  - Summer (DST): UTC+02:00 (CEST)
- INSEE/Postal code: 08026 /08150
- ^{1} French Land Register data, which excludes lakes, ponds, glaciers > 1 km^{2} (0.386 sq mi or 247 acres) and river estuaries.

Aubigny-les-Pothées (French pronunciation: [obiɲi le pɔte], before 1962: Aubigny) is a commune in the Ardennes department in the Grand Est region of northern France.

== Geography ==
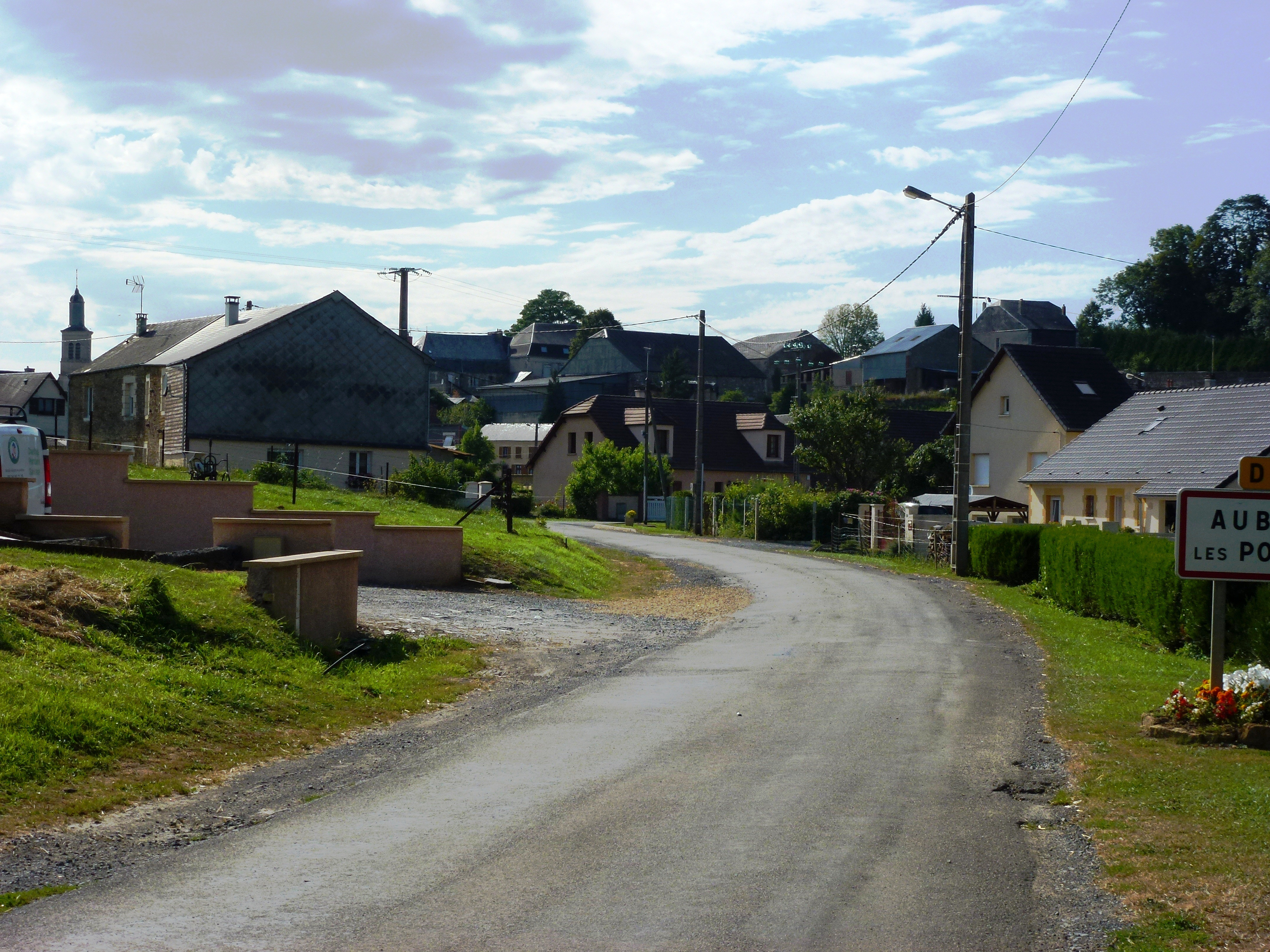
Entrance to the village

Aubigny-les-Pothées is located some 25 km west of Charleville-Mézières and 13 km north of Signy-l'Abbaye. Access to the commune is by road D978 from Logny-Bogny in the west which passes through the commune and the village and continues east to Rouvroy-sur-Audry. The D985 branches off the D978 at the eastern border of the commune and goes south to Signy-l'Abbaye. The minor D20 road goes north from the village to Auvillers-les-Forges. A railway line passes through the commune from east to west but there is no station in the commune. The nearest station is at Liart to the west. The commune is mixed forest and farmland.

The Audry river flows through the commune and the village from west to east and continues east to join the Sormonne south of Sormonne.

== History ==
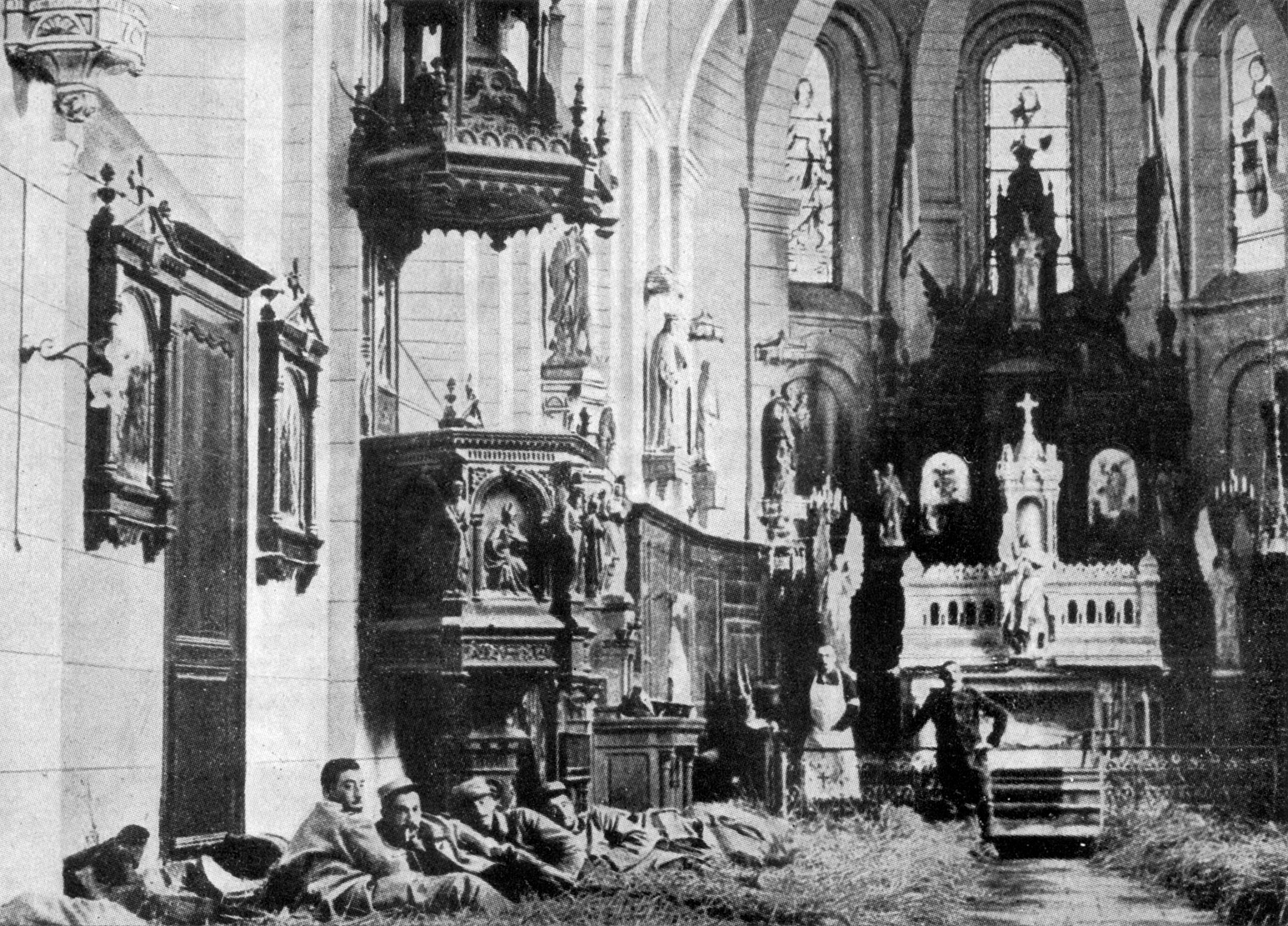
The Church used as a hospital in the First World War

Two Merovingian cemeteries have been identified in the commune: one at a place called Bocmont, the other at a place called Croix-Ancelet. The bodies showed the characteristic positioning of arms along the body and legs separated which predominated in the region in the 6th and 7th centuries.

In the 13th century the village was the main town in les Potées ecclesiastical domain which was a possession of the chapter of Reims. The letter h in Pothées was introduced later. Aubigny was the main town of this possession.

In 1436 people from Liège burned the Chateau of Aubigny.

In the early days of the First World War in 1914, the village church was a very basic hospital. Straw scattered on the ground served as a bed for the wounded.

=== Heraldry ===
Arms of Aubigny-les-Pothées	Blazon: Azure, a cross of Argent cantoned with four fleurs-de-lis of Or.

== Administration ==
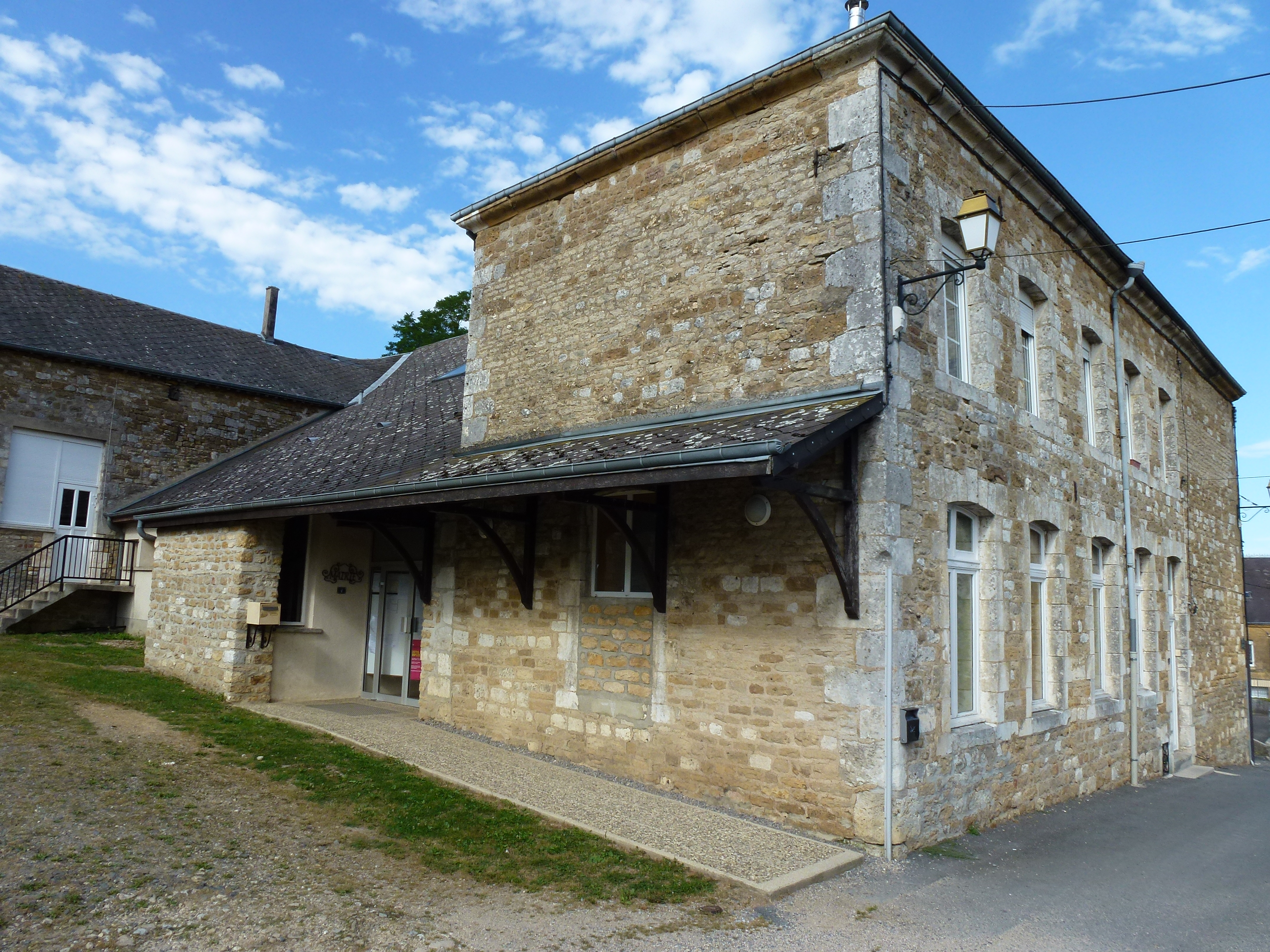
The Town Hall

List of Successive Mayors

From	To	Name
	1883	Nicolas Armand Lecerre
1953		Claude Béroard
2001	current	Alain Malherbe

Aubigny-les-Pothées has adhered to the charter of the Regional Natural Park of the Ardennes since its creation in December 2011.

== Demography ==
The inhabitants of the commune are known as Aubignois or Aubignoises in French.

Historical population

Year	Pop.	±% p.a.
1793	345	—
1821	364	+0.19%
1846	379	+0.16%
1872	419	+0.39%
1901	382	−0.32%
1926	380	−0.02%
1946	304	−1.11%
1962	375	+1.32%
1968	410	+1.50%

Year	Pop.	±% p.a.
1975	392	−0.64%
1982	360	−1.21%
1990	319	−1.50%
1999	319	+0.00%
2007	341	+0.84%
2012	350	+0.52%
2017	315	−2.09%
2023	306	−0.48%

Source: EHESS and INSEE

== Sites and monuments ==
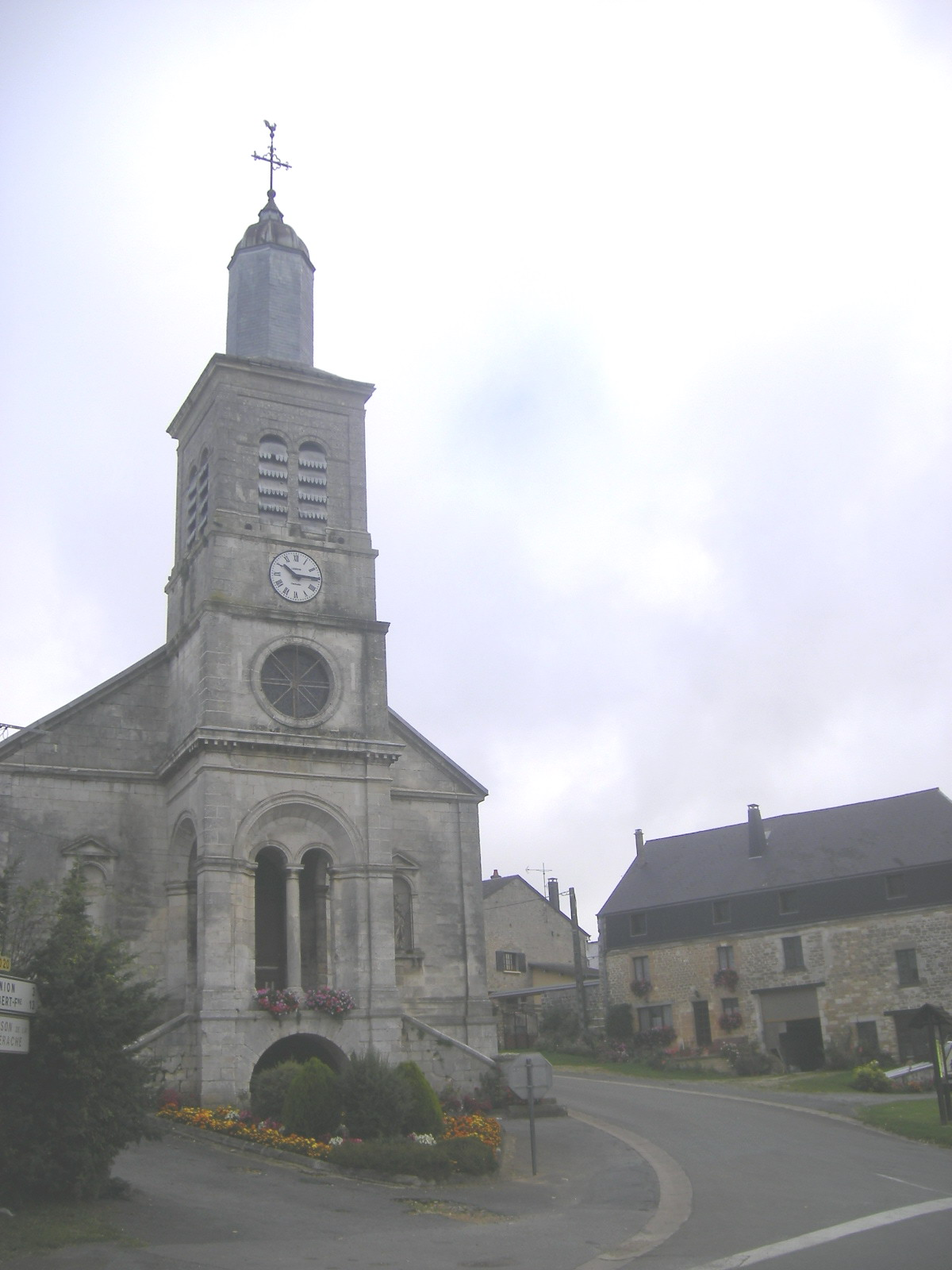
The church Square

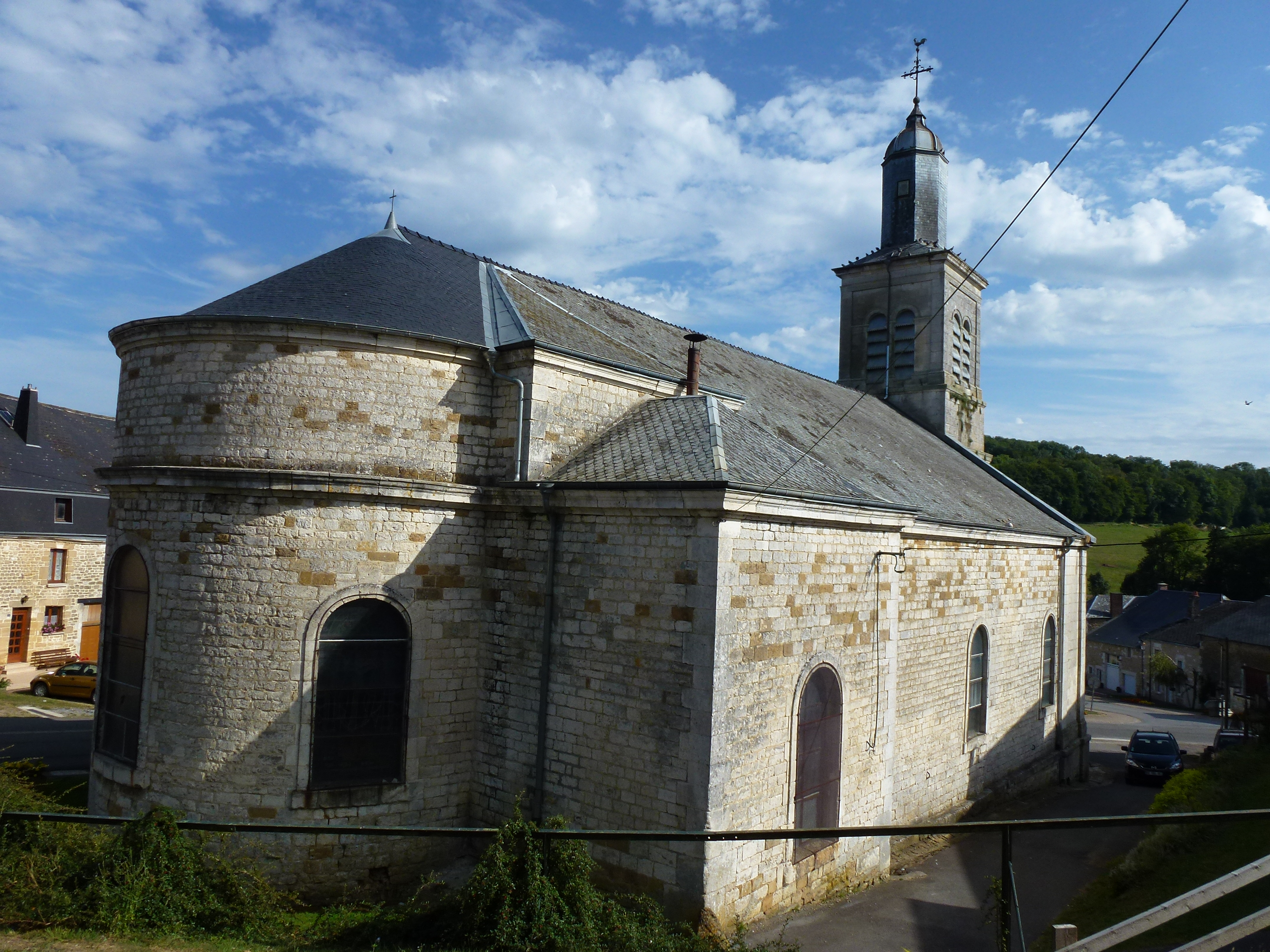
The chevet of the Church

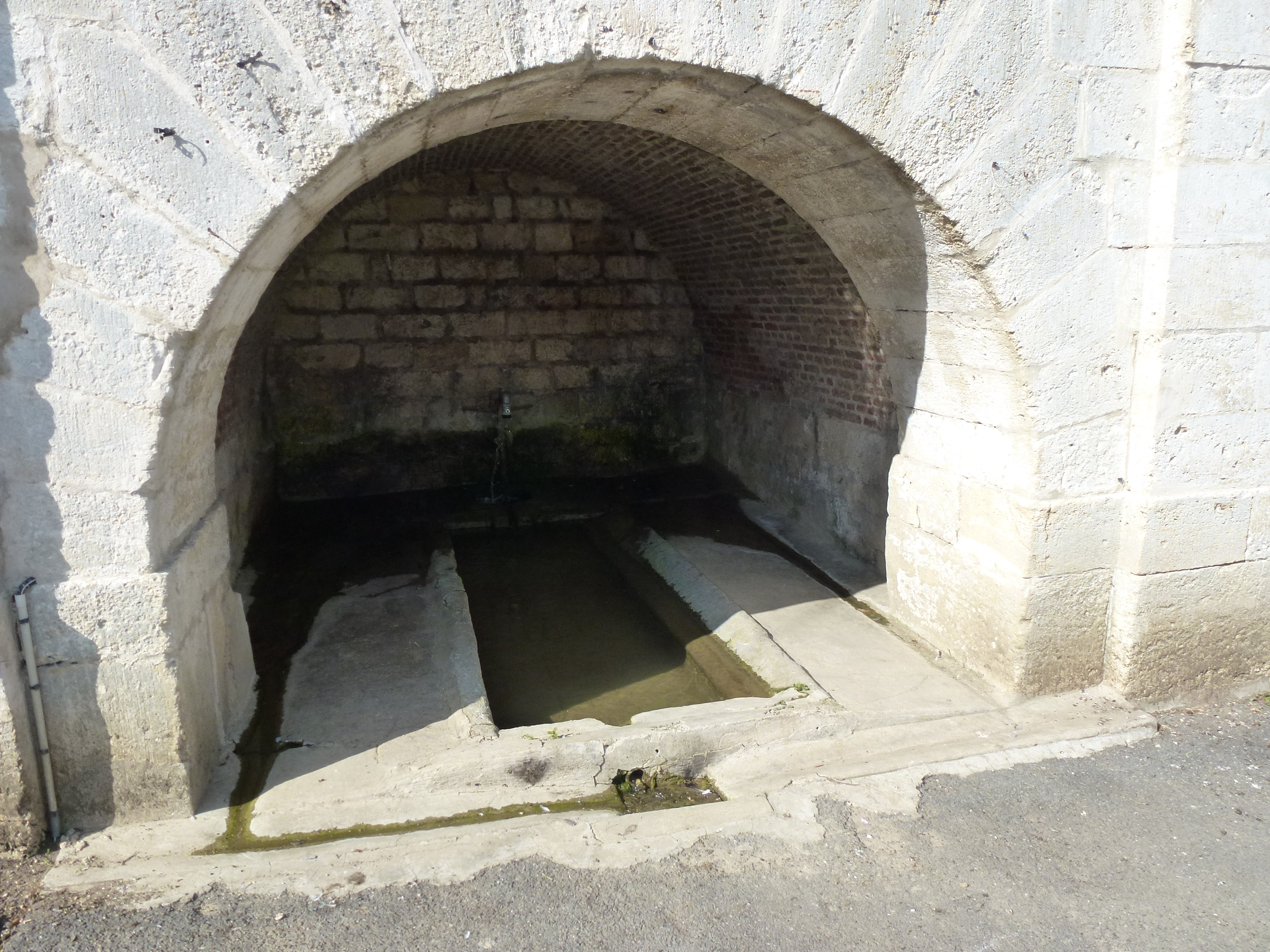
The fountain under the entrance of the Church

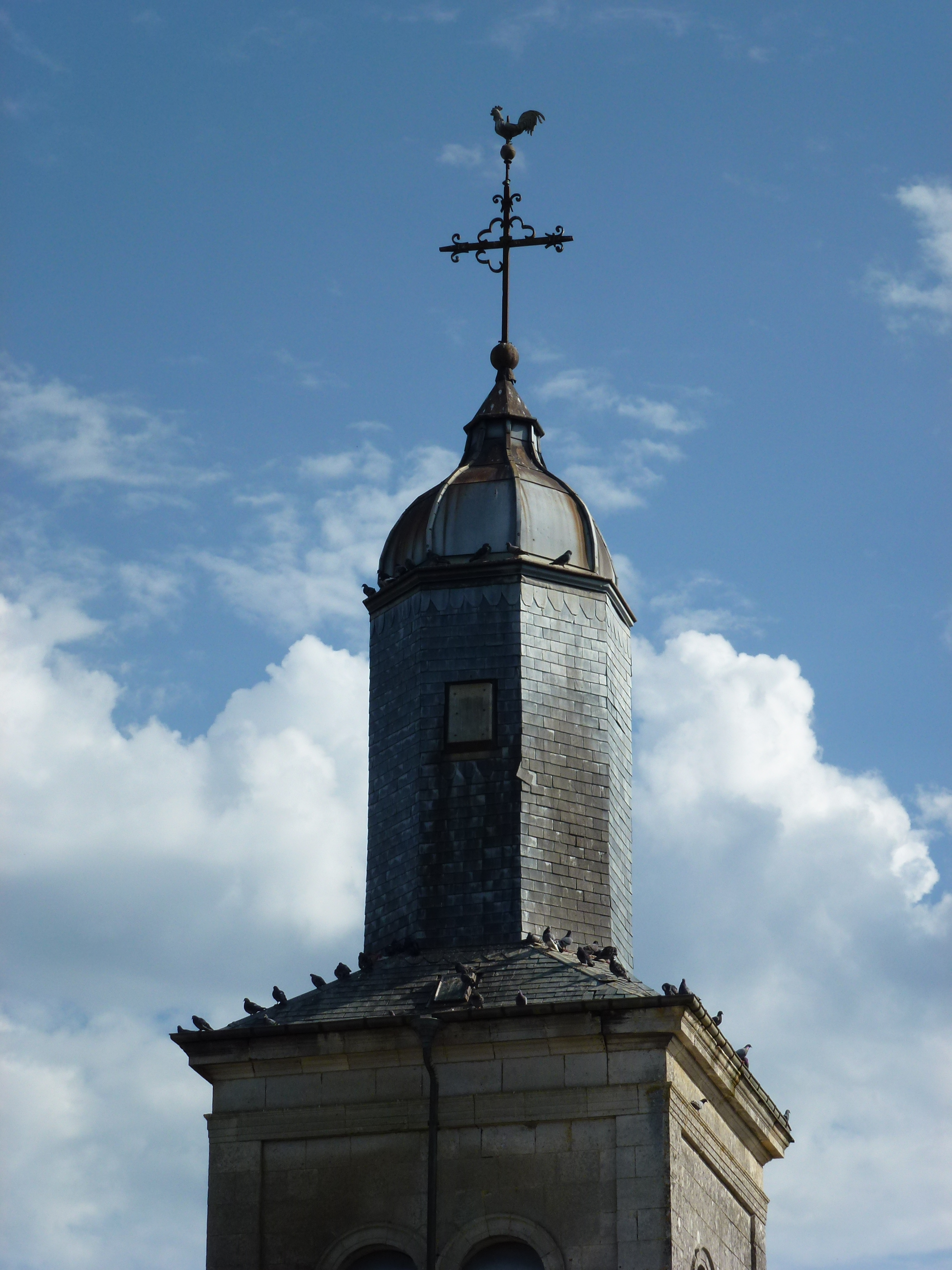
The top of the steeple

== Notable people linked to the commune ==
- Edouard Piette (1827-1906) Archaeologist and pre-historian, born in Aubigny-les-Pothées

== See also ==
- Communes of the Ardennes department
