= Tessarolax =

Tessarolax Temporal range: 145–58.7 Ma Cretaceous to Paleocene

Scientific classification
- Kingdom: Animalia
- Phylum: Mollusca
- Class: Gastropoda
- Subclass: Caenogastropoda
- Order: Littorinimorpha
- Family: Aporrhaidae
- Genus: †Tessarolax; Gabb, 1868

Extinct genus of gastropods

Tessarolax is an extinct genus of fossil sea snails, marine gastropod mollusks in the family Aporrhaidae. The fossil shells of these snails are found in Cretaceous to Paleocene deposits in Europe, North America, and Madagascar.
