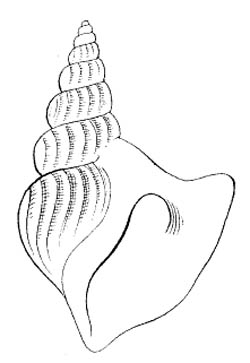
- Arrhoges occidentalis

Scientific classification
- Kingdom: Animalia
- Phylum: Mollusca
- Class: Gastropoda
- Subclass: Caenogastropoda
- Order: Littorinimorpha
- Family: Aporrhaidae
- Genus: Arrhoges
- Species: A. occidentalis

Binomial name
- Arrhoges occidentalis (Beck, 1836)

Synonyms
- Aporrhais occidentalis (Beck, 1836); Rostellaria occidentalis Beck, 1836; Aporrhais mainensis C. W. Johnson, 1926; Aporrhais occidentalis var. mainensis Johnson, 1926; Aporrhais labradorensis C. W. Johnson, 1930; Aporrhais occidentalis var. labradorensis Johnson, 1930

= Arrhoges occidentalis =

Species of gastropod

Arrhoges occidentalis, common name the American pelicanfoot, is a species of medium-sized sea snail, a marine gastropod mollusk in the family Aporrhaidae, the pelican's foot snails or pelican's foot shells.

Morton (1956) considers Arrhoges occidentalis as the most primitive member of the family Aporrhaidae.

== Distribution ==
This species is distributed infralittoral, circalittoral and bathyal in the North West Atlantic Ocean and along the North American coast from Labrador and Massachusetts to off North Carolina. It lives on sand or mud at depths between 10 and 550 m. Off North Carolina it is usually found in deep water.

== Description ==
The gray to yellowish-white shell is strong and has a high, pointed spire. Its length is between 4.1 and 6.4 cm (1 5/8I -2 1/2 inches). The shell has 8–10 well-rounded whorls, each of which shows many strong, curved axial ribs crossed by crowded, fine spiral threads (that may be worn away) on the outer layer. The body whorl contains 20–25 folds. The aperture is long and narrow. It has a thick, shiny white outer lip that suggests a triangular, winglike expansion. The parietal wall and the outer lip are thickened internally. The small operculum is horny and claw-shaped. It is narrow and has smooth edges.

The maximum recorded shell length is 70 mm.

== Habitat ==
The minimum recorded depth for this species is 3.5 m.; maximum recorded depth is 1829 m.

== Feeding patterns ==
The animal uses its proboscis to probe in muddy gravel or in sand, searching for food. It feeds on macro algae particles, benthic diatoms Pleurosignia sp., on detritus and also remains of animal matter, such as sponge spicules.

== Life cycle ==
Sexes are separate or simultaneous hermaphrodites (but self-ferilization is usually prevented due to various mechanisms). Copulation occurs at night from March to April. The small eggs are deposited in the sand or on debris singly or in small groups by the female. The larvae hatch as free-swimming plankton-feeding individuals.

== Predators ==
The American pelicanfoot has as potential predators the gastropod Colus stimpsoni Dall, 1902, the crab Cancer irrotatus Say, 1817 and the Atlantic wolffish Anarhichas lupus Linnaeus, 1758. The well-developed outer shell lips of the adults give them an adequate protection against the claws of Cancer irrotatus.
