= Rouvroy-sur-Audry =

- Commune
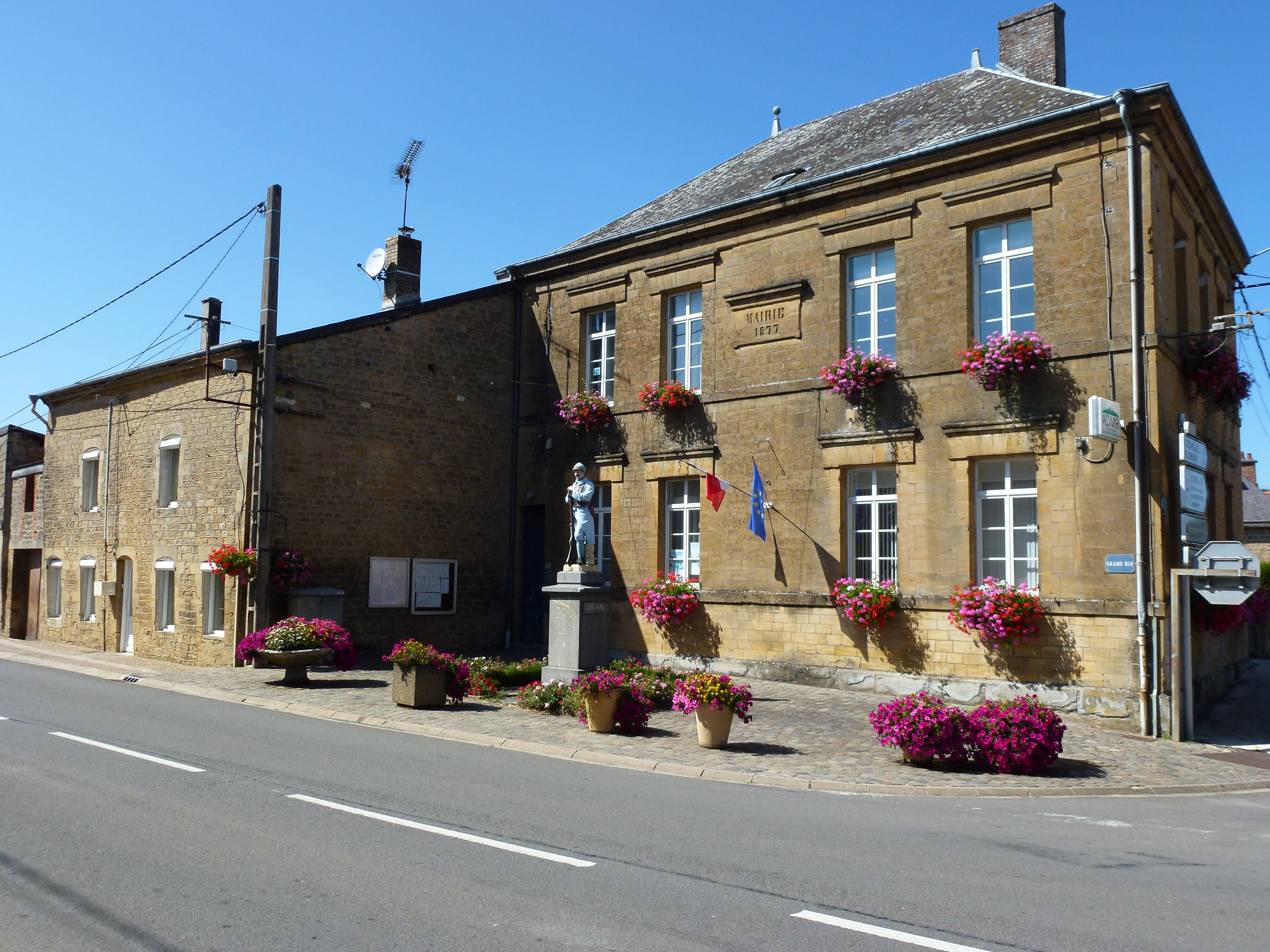
- The town hall in Rouvroy-sur-Audry

- Coat of arms
- Location of Rouvroy-sur-Audry
- Location within France Location within Grand Est
- Coordinates: 49°47′19″N 4°29′41″E
- Country: France
- Region: Grand Est
- Department: Ardennes
- Arrondissement: Charleville-Mézières
- Canton: Signy-l'Abbaye

Government
  - Mayor (2020–2026): Florence Midoux
- Area^{1}: 9.15 km^{2} (3.53 sq mi)
- Elevation: 185 m (607 ft)
- Highest elevation: 294 m (965 ft)
- Lowest elevation: 162 m (531 ft)
- Population (2023): 503
  - Density: 55.0/km^{2} (142/sq mi)
- Time zone: UTC+01:00 (CET)
  - Summer (DST): UTC+02:00 (CEST)
- INSEE/Postal code: 08370 /08150
- ^{1} French Land Register data, which excludes lakes, ponds, glaciers > 1 km^{2} (0.386 sq mi or 247 acres) and river estuaries.

Rouvroy-sur-Audry (French pronunciation: [ʁuvʁwa syʁ odʁi]) is a commune in the Ardennes department in northern France.

== Population ==
Historical population
Year	Pop.	±% p.a.
1968	475	—
1975	503	+0.82%
1982	602	+2.60%
1990	537	−1.42%
1999	539	+0.04%
2007	561	+0.50%
2012	579	+0.63%
2017	583	+0.14%
2023	503	−2.43%
Source: INSEE

== See also ==
- Communes of the Ardennes department
