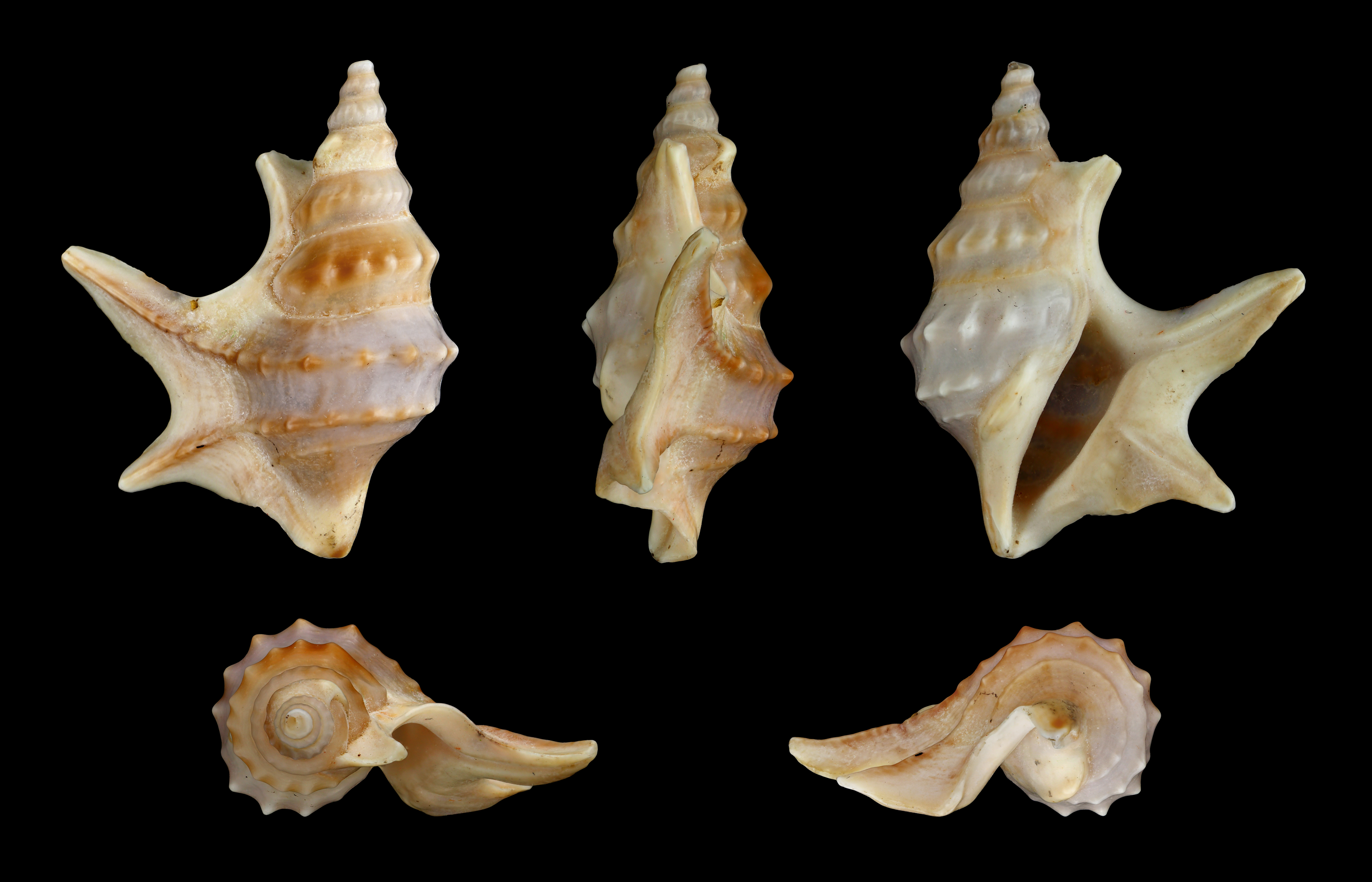
- Five views of a shell of Aporrhais pespelecani

Scientific classification
- Kingdom: Animalia
- Phylum: Mollusca
- Class: Gastropoda
- Subclass: Caenogastropoda
- Order: Littorinimorpha
- Family: Aporrhaidae
- Genus: Aporrhais
- Species: A. pespelecani

Binomial name
- Aporrhais pespelecani Linnaeus, 1758

= Aporrhais pespelecani =

Species of gastropod

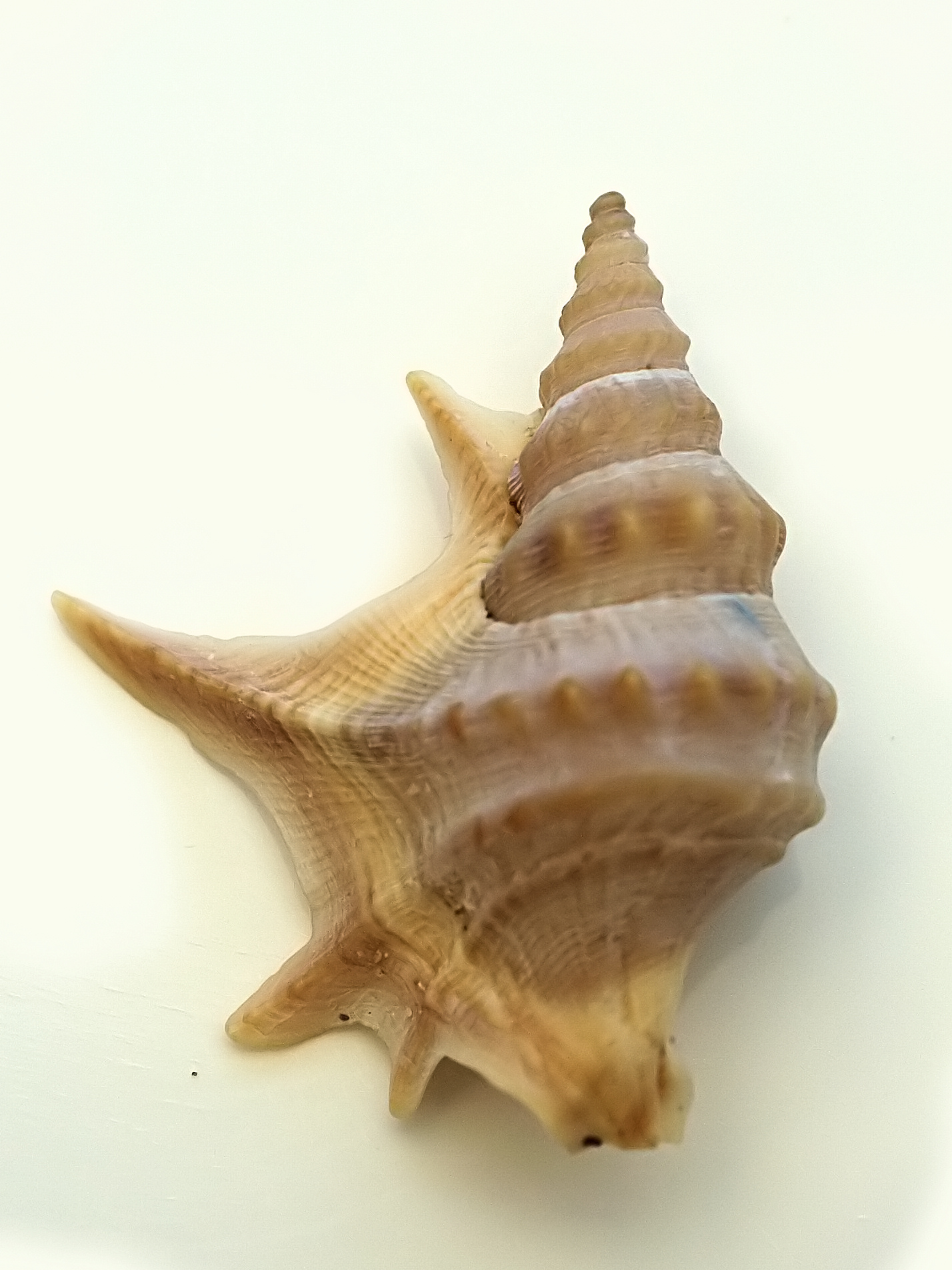
A shell of Aporrhais pespelecani, from Catalonia, Spain

Aporrhais pespelecani, common name the "pelican's foot" (or more precisely "common pelican's foot" to distinguish it from congeners), is a species of sea snail, a marine gastropod mollusk in the family Aporrhaidae.

Until the early 20th century the scientific name was usually written with a hyphen and spelled "pes-pelicani".

== Etymology and nomenclature ==
The specific name pespelecani is Latin, and means the same thing as the common name: "pelican's foot". This name is based on the shape of the three-pointed (or four-pointed) expanded outer lip of the adult shell, which resembles the webbed foot of a sea bird such as a pelican.

The specific name is often spelled pespelicani by analogy with the modern spelling of the word "pelican", however this is incorrect. It was not the original spelling as used by Linnaeus, the original authority of the species, which he called Strombus Pes pelecani. The rules of the ICZN state that the original spelling of a species name is the correct one, even in cases where the word was originally misspelled, or is not in line with current spelling. However, in this case, the specific name must now be written as one word, not two, and cannot be hyphenated.

== Distribution ==
This snail lives in the Eastern Atlantic Ocean, from Norway to the Mediterranean Sea and also in the Black Sea.

== Habitat ==
This species of sea snail lives below the low tide level, in the sublittoral zone, from 10 to 130 m depth, on mud or muddy sand. The empty shells do sometimes wash up on beaches however.

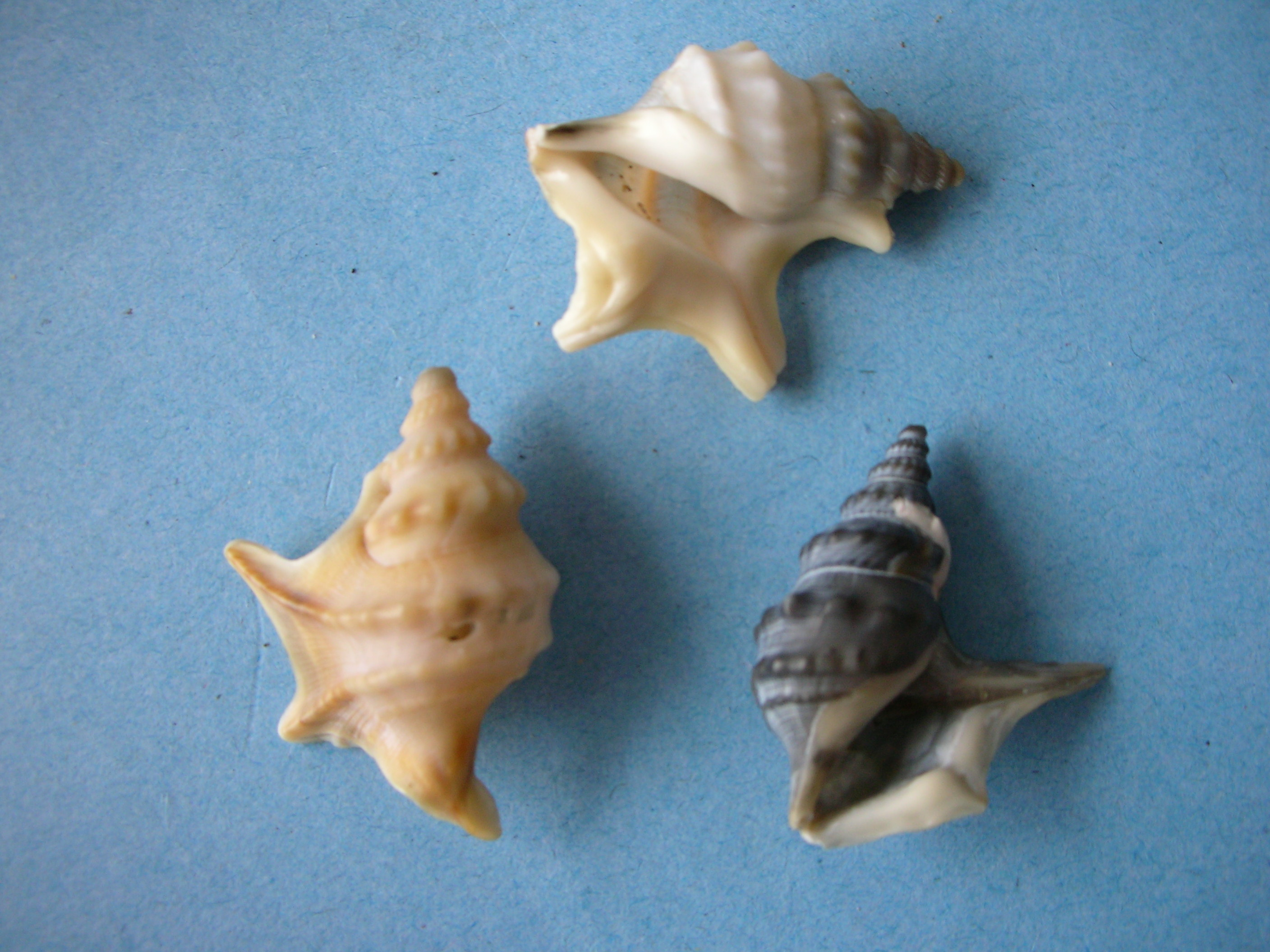
Three beachworn shells of Aporrhais pespelecani from Italy

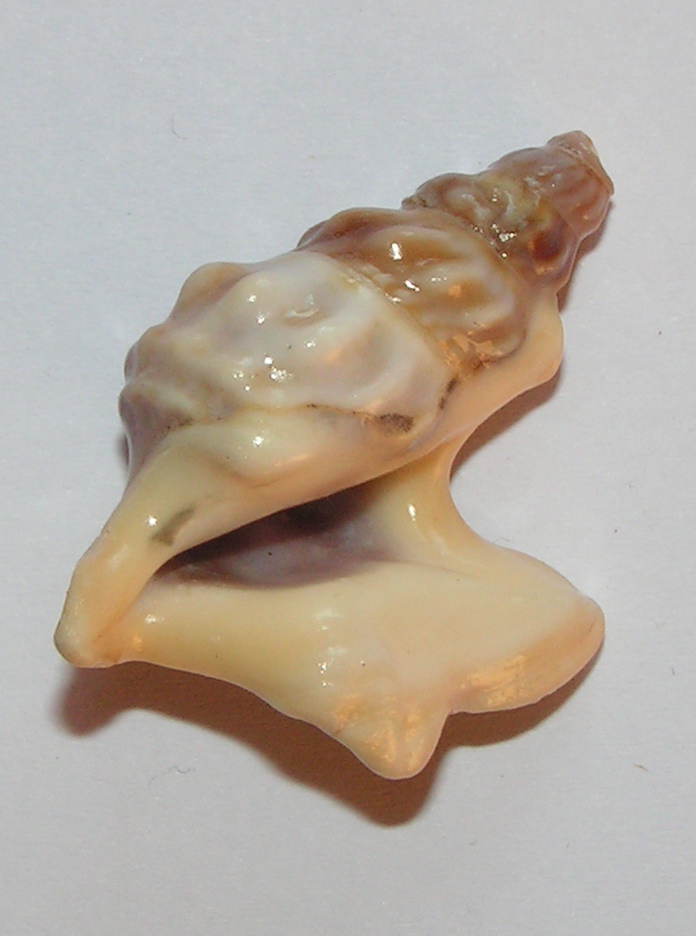
A thick, very mature, pelican's foot shell
