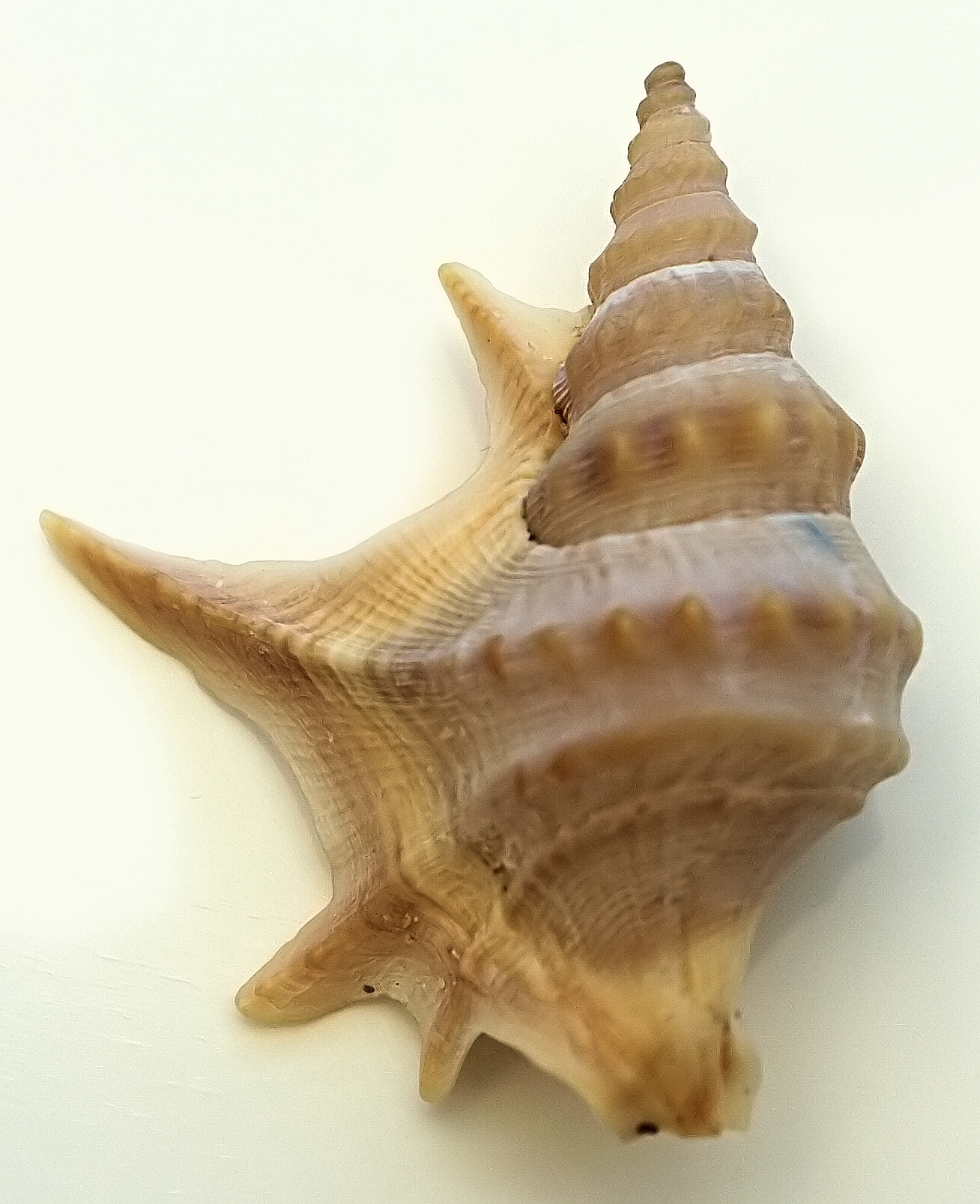
- A shell of Aporrhais pespelecani, from Catalonia, Spain

Scientific classification
- Kingdom: Animalia
- Phylum: Mollusca
- Class: Gastropoda
- Subclass: Caenogastropoda
- Order: Littorinimorpha
- Superfamily: Stromboidea
- Family: Aporrhaidae; Gray, 1850

Genera
- See text

Synonyms
- † Anchurinae Kollmann, 2009 · accepted, alternate representation; Aporrhaididae (misspelling); Aporrhaiidae (Spelling variation); Aporrhainae Gray, 1850 · accepted, alternate representation; † Arrhoginae Popenoe, 1983; Chenopidae Deshayes, 1865; † Dicrolomatidae Korotkov, 1992; † Dimorphosominae Kollmann, 2009 · accepted, alternate representation; † Harpagodinae Pchelintsev, 1963 · accepted, alternate representation; † Perissopterinae Korotkov, 1992; † Pterocerellinae Bandel, 2007 · accepted, alternate representation; † Pugnellidae Kiel & Bandel, 1999 (original rank); † Pugnellinae Kiel & Bandel, 1999 · accepted, alternate representation; Spinilomatinae Gründel, Nützel & Schulbert, 2009 · accepted, alternate representation; † Struthiopterinae Zinsmeister & Griffin, 1995 · accepted, alternate representation; † Tundorinae Bandel, 2007 †

= Aporrhaidae =

Family of gastropods

Aporrhaidae is a family of sea snails commonly called the "pelican's foot snails." The taxonomy of the Gastropoda by Bouchet & Rocroi, 2005 categorizes Aporrhaidae as marine gastropod mollusks in the clade Littorinimorpha.

Aporrhaids are commercially important, especially in traditional fisheries.

== Description ==
Aporrhaids have a large lip with finger-like extensions, and a small operculum. They do not have movable eyes. Instead, their eyes are fixed at the base of each tentacle.

The mollusk has one narrow foot, which renders its motion interrupted as the foot must raise the shell a tiny bit in each single movement, simultaneously pushing it forward. The motion must be repeated again and again for the mollusk to travel.

== Habitat ==
Aporrhaidae live on muddy and sandy bottoms, sometimes in very large populations.

== Subfamilies ==
Subfamilies in the family Aporrhaidae include:

- Aporrhainae Gray, 1850 - synonym: Chenopidae Deshayes, 1865
- Arrhoginae Popenoe, 1983 - synonyms: Alariidae Koken, 1889 (inv.); Dicrolomatidae Korotkov, 1992
- † Harpagonidae Pchelintsev, 1963
- † Perissopterinae Korotkov, 1992 - synonym: Struthiopterinae Zinsmeister & Griffin, 1995
- † Spinigerinae Korotkov, 1992 (inv.)

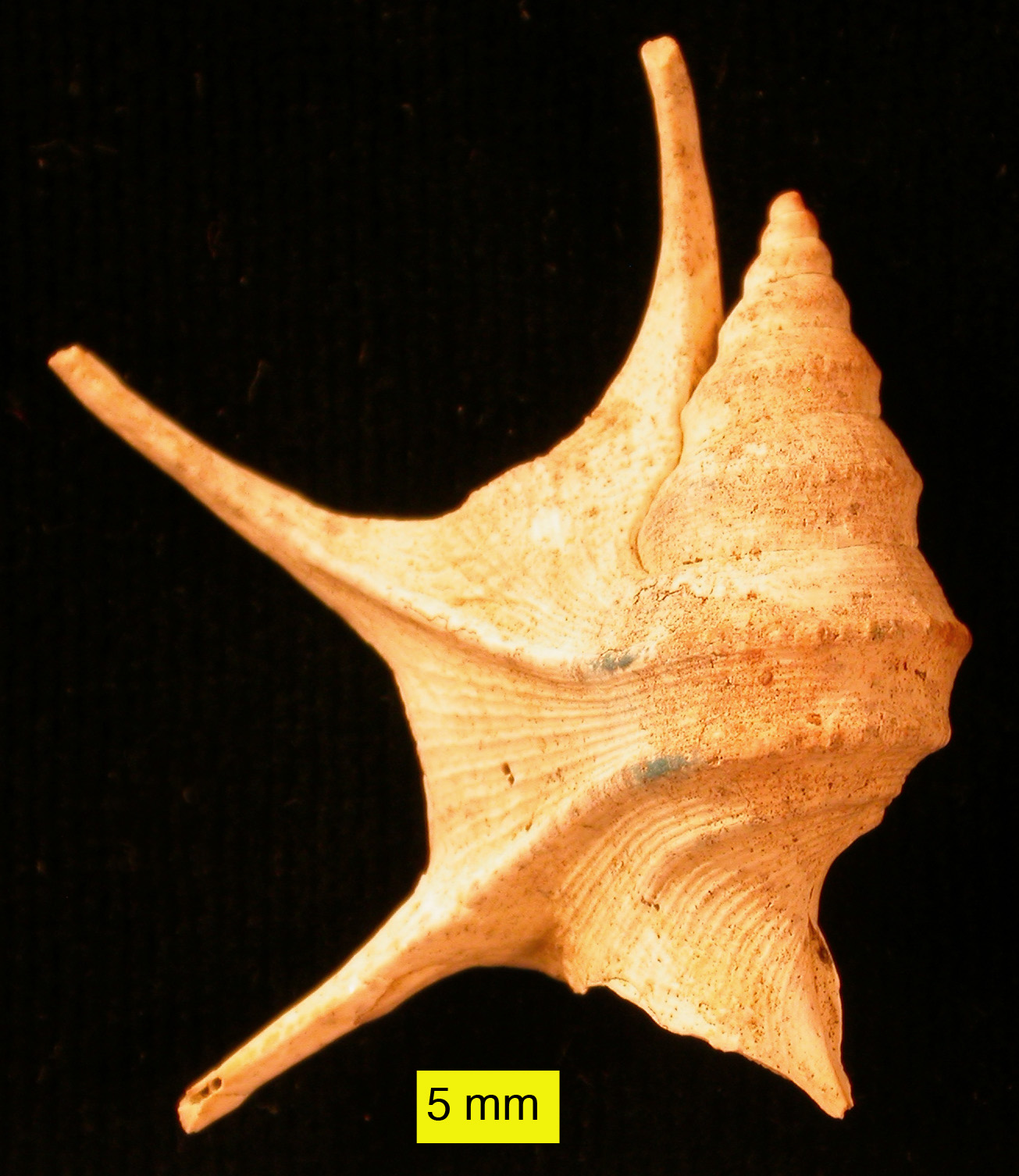
Aporrhais from the Pliocene of Cyprus.

== Genera ==
There are only two Recent genera:

- Aporrhais da Costa, 1778
- Arrhoges Gabb, 1868
- † Dicroloma Gabb, 1868
- † Drepanocheilus Meek, 1864
- † Hemichenopus Steinmann & Wilckens, 1908
- † Struthioptera Finlay & Marwick, 1937

Fossil genera within the family Aporrhaidae include:

- Alarimella Saul, 1998
- Anchura Conrad, 1860
- Antarctohoges Stilwell & Zinsmeister, 1992
- Araeodactylus Harris & Burrows, 1891
- Auriala Hacobjan, 1976
- Austroaporrhais Zinsmeister & Griffin, 1995
- Bicorempterus Gründel, 2001
- Ceratosiphon Gill, 1870
- Cultrigera Böhm, 1885
- Cuphosolenus Piette, 1876
- Cuphotifer Piette, 1876
- Cyclomolops Gabb, 1868
- Diarthema Piette, 1864
- Digitolabrum Cossmann, 1904
- Dimorphosoma Gardner, 1875
- Graciliala Sohl, 1960
- Goniocheila Gabb, 1868
- Helicaulax Gabb, 1868
- Kangilioptera Rosenkrantz, 1970
- Kaunhowenia Abdel Gawad, 1986
- Latiala Sohl, 1960
- Lispodesthes White, 1875
- Maussenetia Cossmann, 1904
- Mexopus Kiel & Perrilliat, 2001
- Monocuphus Piette, 1876
- Perissopter Tate, 1865
- Peruchilus Olsson, 1931
- Pietteia Cossmann, 1904
- Platyoptera Conrad, 1855
- Pseudanchura Kollmann, 2005
- Pterocerella Meek, 1864
- Pugioptera Pchelincev, 1953
- Strombopugnellus Koch, 1911
- Struthiochenopus Zinsmeister & Griffin, 1995
- Teneposita Loch, 1989
- Tessarolax Gabb, 1864
- Tibiaporrhais Elder, 1990
- Toarctocera Gründel, Nützel & Schulbert, 2009 - type species: Rostellaria subpunctata - Toarctocera subpunctata (von Munster in Goldfuss, 1826–1844)
- Trilemma Blagovetshenskiy & Shumilkin, 2006
- Tulochilus Finlay & Marwick, 1937
- Tundora Stephenson, 1941
- Ueckeritzella Gründel, 1998
- Wateletia Cossmann, 1889
