= Herzl paints Herzl =

Herzl paints Herzl is a series of exhibitions that ran from 1 October 2016 to 2018 in six locations across Europe and Israel. It was created by digital painter Israel Herzl, a fourth cousin of Theodor Herzl. He was joined by fellow Israeli artists Shai Yehezkeli, Yael Bar Tana, and Boaz Arad.

The exhibition commemorated the 120th anniversary of the First Zionist Congress in Basel, in 1897. Within eight years, Herzl had positioned Zionism as a world movement with institutions that led to the establishment of the State of Israel.

The first exhibition opened in the Herzl Museum on Mount Herzl in Jerusalem on 1 October 2016. Foreign Ministry Director General Yuval Rotem heard about the exhibition at the Herzl Museum. He was deeply impressed and asked to present it in four other exhibitions under the sponsorship of the Foreign Ministry – in Jerusalem, Vienna, Geneva and Basel.

The exhibition was shown in the:

- Foreign Ministry Museum in Jerusalem in February 2017
- Atelierhaus der Akademie der Bildenden Künste in Vienna in May 2017
- Swiss Jewish Museum in Basel in August 2017, as part of Group exhibition "Neuland". "Neuland" was part of the jubilee celebrations in Basel of the Zionist Congress that took place there in 1897

The last exhibition in Europe was at the University of Geneva in November 2017; in Israel, at Kfar Saba in January 2018.

Rotem said at the opening of the exhibition in the Foreign Ministry gallery: "The exhibition is unique in that it is dedicated to one personality, and the exhibition came to the Foreign Ministry after it was presented for the last three months at the Herzl Museum on Mount Herzl, after an extension due to its success. The exhibition was made available to the Ministry of Foreign Affairs by Israel Herzl, who combined his special skills in digital painting with his familiarity with the image of the state's dreamer".

Because the words of Berl Katznelson, the founder of Labor Zionism - "I have a fear that the next generation will know Herzl as a name, a slogan, a flag, or at most a fine legend" and the words of Amos Ayalon, Herzl's modern biographer - "In today's Israel, Herzl is at most the name of a street", the purpose of this exhibition was that no Jew will forget what the Israeli nation owes to Herzl and his dream.

The duration of the exhibitions was seven months. Over 5,000 visitors visited these exhibitions.

Mr. David Matlow the biggest collector of Theodor Herzl wrote in his book "Collecting the Dream"

""Ïsrael Herzl is a visual artist....Israel Herzl's artwork was featured in "Herzl paints Herzl", a series of exhibitions that ran from 2016 to 2018 at six locations across Europe and Israel"", Ref 1
