= Operation Boatswain =

WWII military operation

Operation Boatswain was the first of the operational missions carried out by the Palmach as part of the cooperation between the Jewish Yishuv in Mandatory Palestine and the British during World War II. The mission to sabotage oil refineries in Tripoli was unsuccessful, ending with the disappearance of 23 Palmach commandos and British SOE officer Major Sir Anthony Palmer, 4th Baronet after their boat was lost at sea on 18 May 1941.

== Palmach ==
The Palmach was established by the Haganah High Command on 14 May 1941. Its two primary aims were to protect the Yishuv against attacks by Arabs in the event of a British retreat from Palestine and defence of Palestine against an Axis powers invasion. Yitzhak Sadeh was named as Palmach commander. Initially the group consisted of around one hundred men.

== Operation ==
In the early summer of 1941 the British military authorities agreed to joint operations against Vichy France forces in Lebanon and Syria. The first planned action was a sabotage mission against oil installations at Tripoli, Lebanon. It was feared that the refinery would provide the Wehrmacht aircraft fuel, and help thwart the planned invasion of Lebanon and Syria. The refinery was in an area well fortified by a unit of Senegalese troops from hostile French army.

A plan emerged for a motor launch, carrying 23 Palmach commandos (later known as "the twenty-three who went down with the ship" (Hebrew: כ׳׳ג יורדי הסירה, romanized: kaf-gimel yordei ha-sira) and a Major Palmer acting as an observer, to embark from Haifa. Upon arrival, three of the Palmach would remain aboard while the rest sabotaged the Tripoli refineries. Practice runs in Caesarea had achieved excellent results.

On the night of 18 May 1941, the police were ordered to give up one of their best launches. Palmer and the 23 then took over the Sea Lion (Hebrew: ארי הים, romanized: Ari Hayam), cast off and were never seen again. It has never been determined exactly what happened to them.

A 2000 commission of inquiry suggested that the 24 were killed by an explosion, possibly the result of a submarine attack, or possibly due to accidental detonation of the explosives they carried, and the boat was sunk at sea. According to Israeli military historian Aryeh Yitzhaki, the boat was destroyed by explosives that went off while at sea, killing all aboard, and some of the bodies were found by Yosef Kostika, a Haganah agent then stationed in Tripoli, after they washed up on Tripoli's shore. Kostika allegedly sent a detailed report back to Palestine, but Palmach commanders decided to cover it up so as not to lower morale and motivation to enlist in the Palmach. Other research suggests that the Sea Lion did reach Tripoli, but was intercepted by the local coast guard.

== Loss of life ==
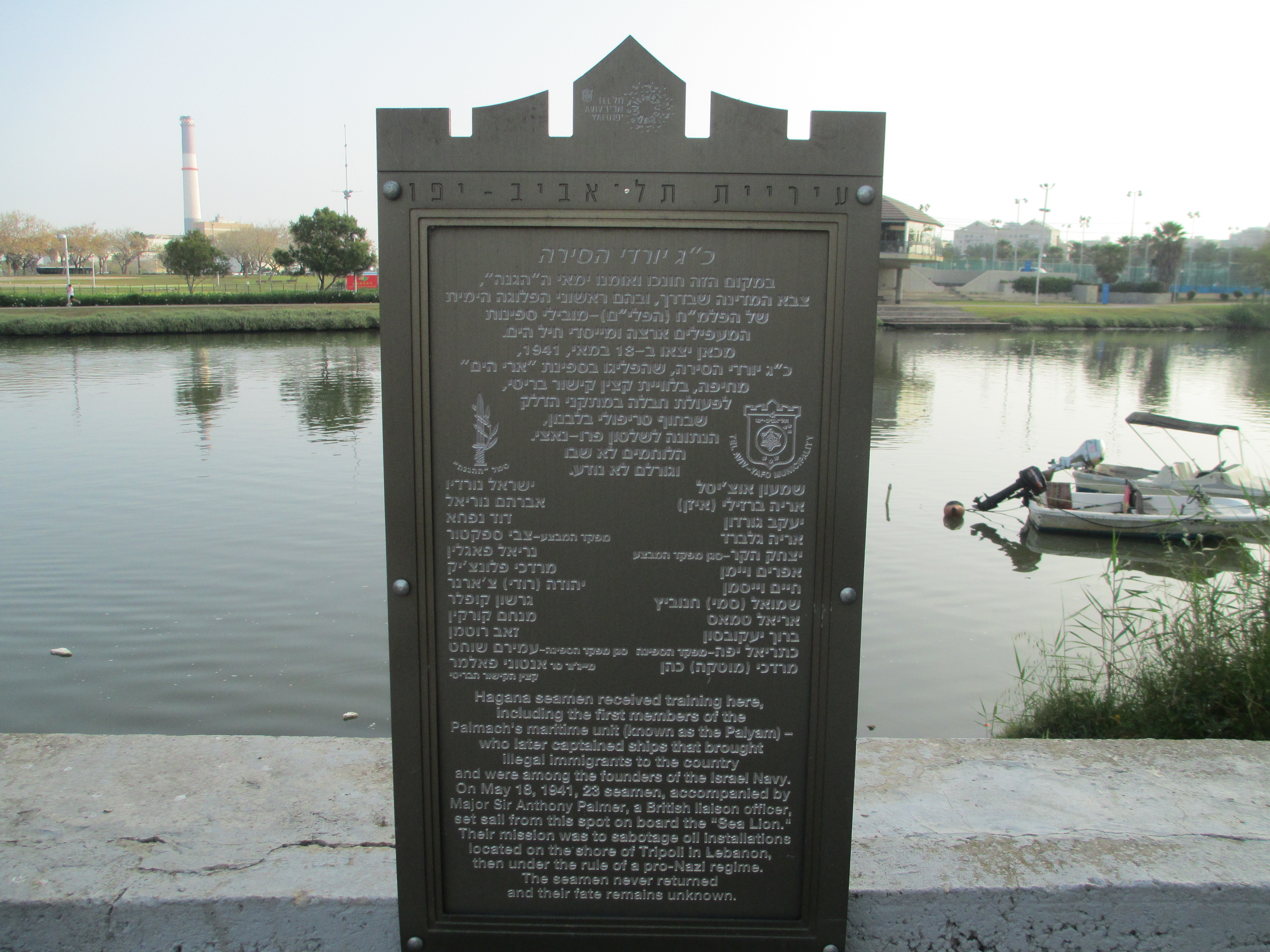
Memorial plaque to the Hagana in Yarkon river

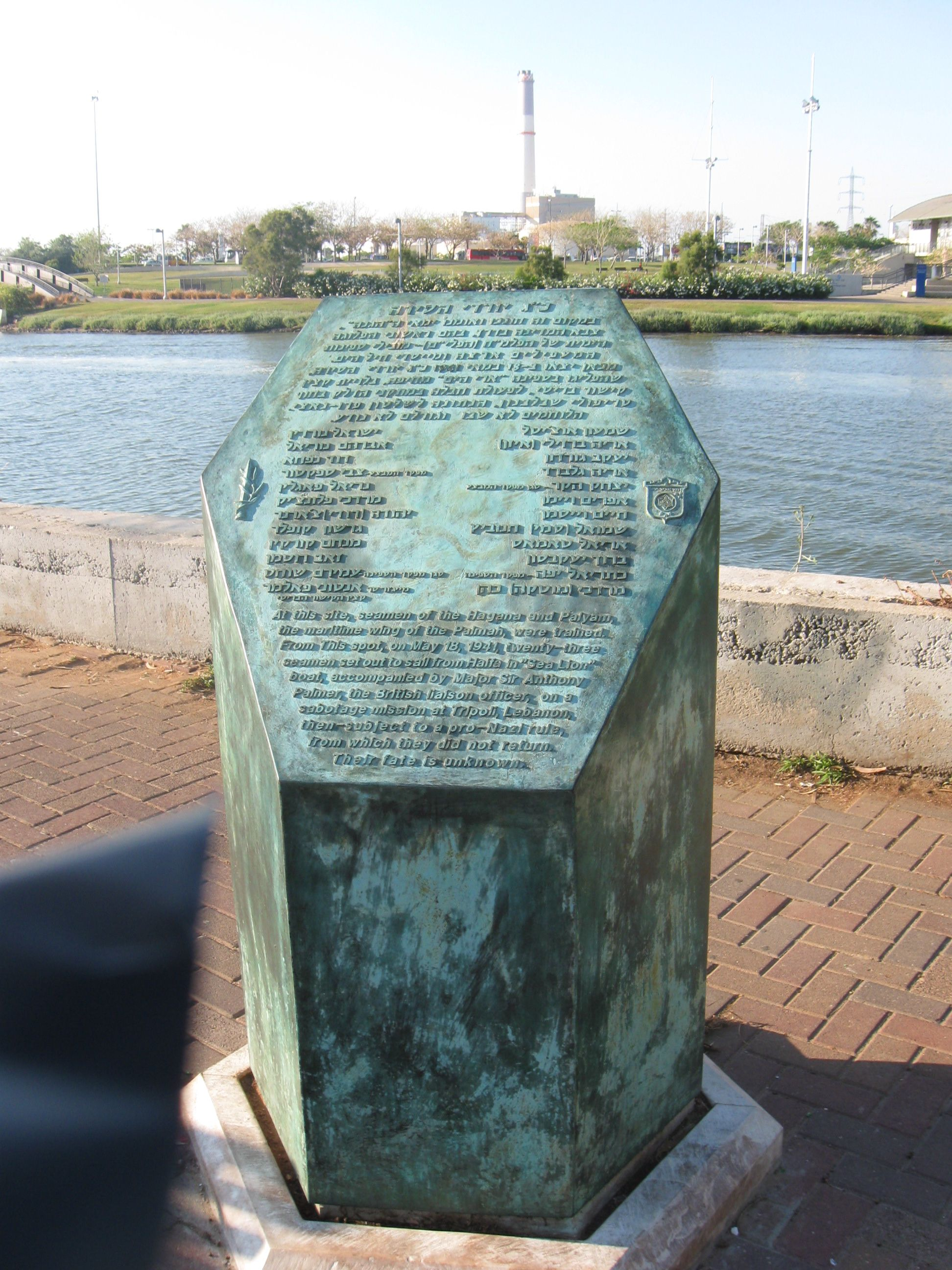
Memorial column by the Yarkon River in Tel Aviv

The 24 men lost were:

- Major Sir Anthony Palmer
- Aryeh Barzilai-Eizen
- Mordechai Cohen
- Rudi Yehuda Czerner
- Aryeh Gelbert
- Yaakov Gordon
- Shmuel Hanovitz
- Yitzhak Hecker
- Gershon Kopler
- Menachem Korakin
- David Nafcha
- Israel Norden-Nord
- Avraham Nuriel
- Neriel Paglin
- Mordechai Plonchik
- Ze'ev Rotman
- Amiram Shochat
- Zvi Spector
- Ariel Temes
- Shimon Utchitel
- Efraim Veiman
- Chaim Weisman
- Baruch Yaakovson
- Katriel Yaffe

== Legacy ==
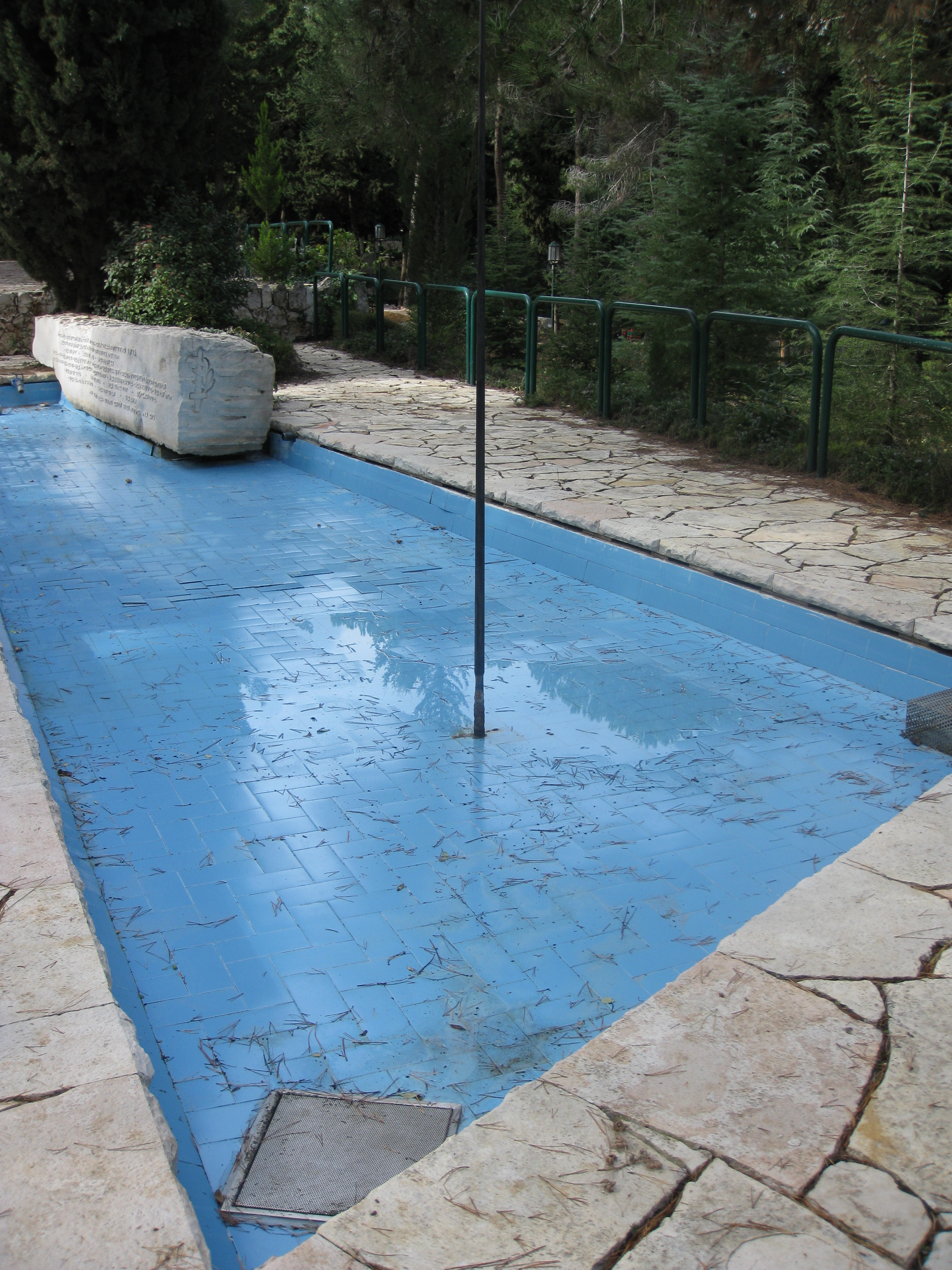
Mount Herzl "Memorial to the 23 Who Went Down at Sea"

This was the first act of the Palmach. The failure of the mission and loss of the 23 were blows to morale and delayed the building of a Jewish naval power. However, the legacy of the "23 Who Went Down at Sea" became a source of inspiration to both the Palmach and its naval force, the Palyam, and their memory remains a source of inspiration to IDF soldiers and sailors.

The 23 have been memorialized in various ways. The immigrant ship Kaf Gimel Yordei Ha’Sira, which arrived in Haifa carrying 790 illegal immigrants in 1946, was named after them. They are also honoured by a memorial on Mount Herzl and a memorial where they were last seen, by the Yarkon River. Many streets in Israel have also been named after the 23. However, only in January 2015 did historian and Association of Jewish Ex-Servicemen and Women archivist Martin Sugarman manage to persuade the Commonwealth War Graves Commission to formally commemorate the 23 on their website and to inscribe their names on the Memorial to the Missing (the "Brookwood Memorial") at Brookwood Cemetery, Surrey.
