= Joan Winters =

American dancer

- Born: December 8, 1909; Seattle, Washington, United States
- Died: October 1933 (aged 23)
- Body discovered: November 4, 1933
- Other names: Carol Godfrey, Carol Vesta von Niedergesaess
- Occupation: Dancer

Joan Winters (December 8, 1909 – October 1933) was a Broadway dancer who was murdered in the Garden of Gethsemane, outside Jerusalem, in 1933. Although her birth name was Carol Vesta von Niedergesaess, her father changed the family surname to Godfrey during World War I, so for most of her life she was known as Carol Godfrey. She was born in Seattle, Washington, where she lived with her family until 1928.

== Dancer ==
Winters appeared on Broadway in 1930 as Sue in the drama Bad Girl. She left for Europe on April 13, 1932 and planned to return to New York City in time to celebrate her birthday on December 8, 1933.

== Murder ==
According to a UPI wire report from November 4, 1933, Winters's corpse was discovered together with the body of Mohammed Karamini, an Indian civil service employee from Madras, by an elderly monk in a secluded part of the Garden of Gethsemane, "at a spot usually unfrequented except at Eastertide when devout pilgrims go to the holy ground," in early November 1933. Karamini, who had been Winters's guide, had been shot to death. Winters died of head injuries.

One source said Winters met Karamini in Athens, Greece and the two had arrived in Haifa on October 29. They may have encountered Arab riots taking place outside Jerusalem's Old City in protest against increased Jewish immigration into Palestine. According to the UPI account, Winters and Karamini appeared to have been ambushed. Authorities admitted that they were puzzled by the murders.

An East Indian Muslim, Mohamed Ikram, was detained as a suspect in the death inquiry in early November 1933, but was released for lack of evidence.

== Family reaction ==
Joan's father, Bert Godfrey (born Otto Christian von Niedergesaess), a marine engineer from Brooklyn, New York and the head of Godfrey Propeller Adjusting Corporation of Brooklyn, met with reporters in his home at the Hotel St. George. He revealed a letter from Joan addressed to her mother, Beulah Godfrey (née Beulah May Taft, 1881–1974), that had arrived two weeks earlier. Winters wrote that on her arrival in Istanbul in early October, she had been arrested as a spy and searched by female police officers who confiscated letters in her possession. She was questioned and released several hours later.

Two months before the murder, her parents received a letter from her stating that she had met a young Serbian businessman with whom she had fallen in love, but he did not return her affections. The letter was written from Bucharest, Romania. Godfrey said that he sent several letters to the United States State Department, none of which was answered. Her mother, who said that Winters had intended to write a book about Palestine, kept the collection of dolls that Joan had sent to her younger sister, Loyal, from the various countries she had visited on her ill-fated trip.

== Burial ==
Winters is buried in Jerusalem in the American Cemetery, now the Alliance Church International Cemetery. The Jewish American Society for Historic Preservation provided a gravestone in June 2014.

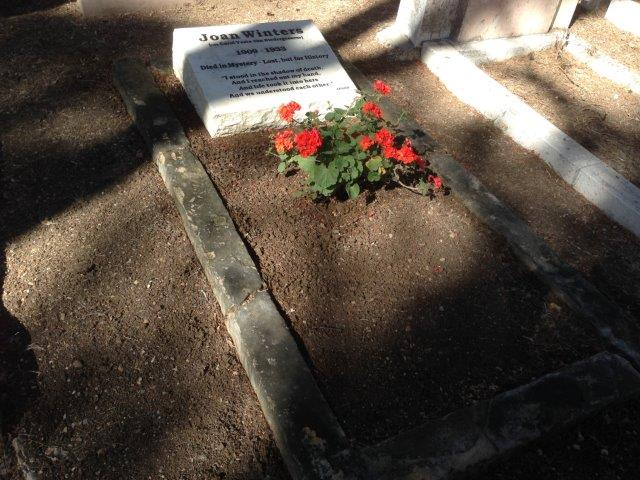
Joan Winters' grave

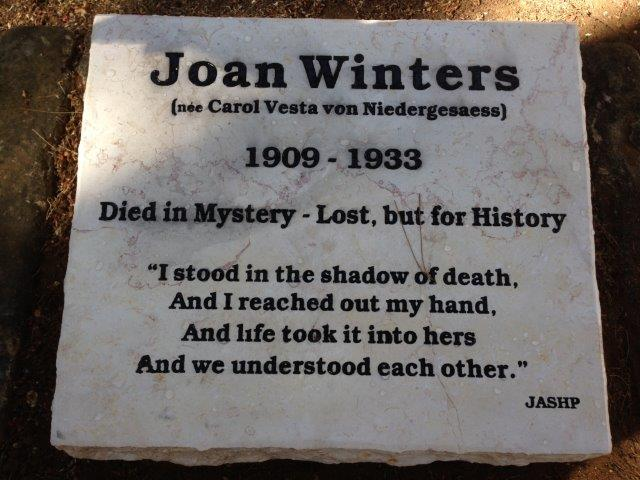
Joan Winters' headstone

The text of an enigmatic and prophetic poem that she wrote to her parents shortly before her death is engraved on her tombstone. The entire text reads:

Joan Winters

(née Carol Vesta von Niedergesaess)

1909–1933

Died in Mystery – Lost, but for History

I stood in the shadow of death,
And I reached out my hand,
And life took it into hers,
And we understood each other.

JASHP

== See also ==
- List of solved missing person cases (pre-1950)
- List of unsolved murders (1900–1979)
