= Jewish American Society for Historic Preservation =

The Jewish American Society for Historic Preservation (JASHP) is an American non-profit 501(c)(3) volunteer historical society. The society locates sites of American and Jewish historical interest and importance. It works with local community organizations, synagogues, churches, historical societies, governments and individuals, to erect interpretive historical markers that help illuminate the American-Jewish experience and reflect on the commonality of being American.

JASHP was founded in 1999 after the discovery by the founder, Jerry Klinger, of the first permanent Jewish house of worship in the State of New Mexico (Temple Montefiore, Las Vegas, N.M.). JASHP has completed projects in 44 states and in 9 countries. Projects are constantly being developed, and proposals are welcomed. Over 7,000,000 people a year benefit from JASHP projects. The society is a small organization. Each program is individualized, with organizational participation from as few as two or three people to as many as 300. Considering JASHP's size, its impact has been disproportionately large.

JASHP is the recipient of Hadassah's Myrtle Wreath Award, which is "given to individuals and non-profit organizations which have made significant humanitarian contributions to our community."

== Programs ==
JASHP - A partial list of completed programs and projects:

- Alabama – Mobile, Shaare Shomayim - Gates of Heaven, first permanent Jewish house of worship in Alabama - 1841

Tuskegee Civil Rights and Historic Trail Marker System- 13 markers.

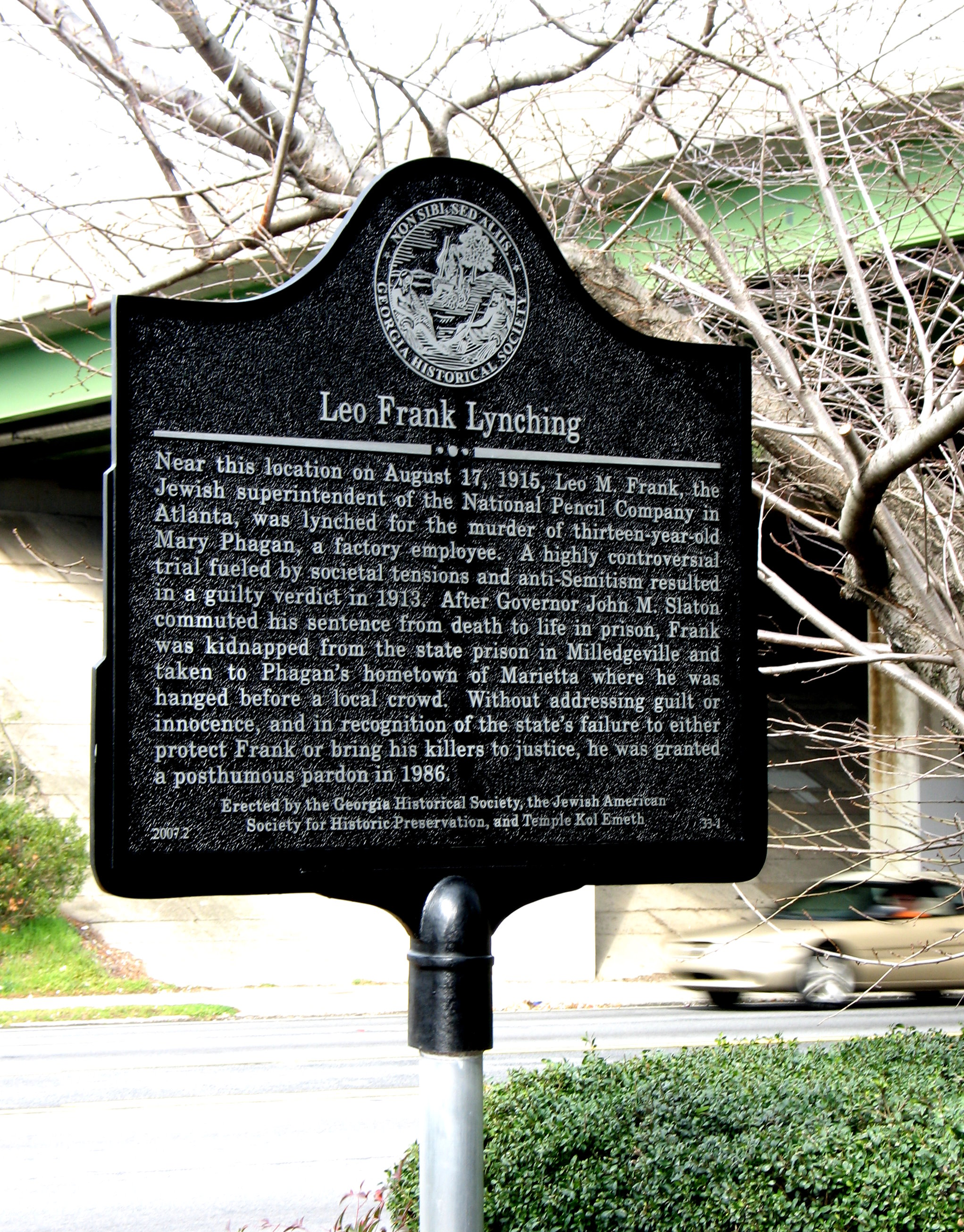
Leo Frank marker, Marietta, Georgia

- Tuskegee Civil Rights and Historic Trail Marker System

- Arkansas – Little Rock
1. Concordia Hall
2. Broncho Billy Anderson, The First Cowboy Western Movie Star
- California Sutro Heights
- Colorado – Cotopaxi, Russian Jewish Cemetery - 1882–1884
- Congressional Medal of Honor Private Benjamin Levy,
1. First Jewish American to earn the MOH -1862
- Connecticut – Groton, Jews and the American Navy
- Delaware – Wilmington, Ohabe Shalom, First Permanent Jewish House of Worship in Delaware - 1880
- Florida, Pensacola, Temple Beth El, First Permanent Jewish House of Worship in Florida, 1876
- Florida, Palm Beach
1. Wakodahatchee Wetlands
2. Green Cay Wetlands
- Iowa – Keokuk, B'Nai Israel Congregation, First Permanent Jewish House of Worship in Iowa - 1855
- Kansas – Kansas City, Jewish American and World War I
- Kansas – Leavenworth, Temple B'Nai Jeshurun, First Permanent Jewish House of Worship in Kansas - 1866
- Louisiana – New Orleans
1. Shangarai Chasset, First Permanent Jewish House of Worship in Louisiana - 1845
2. Touro Infirmary

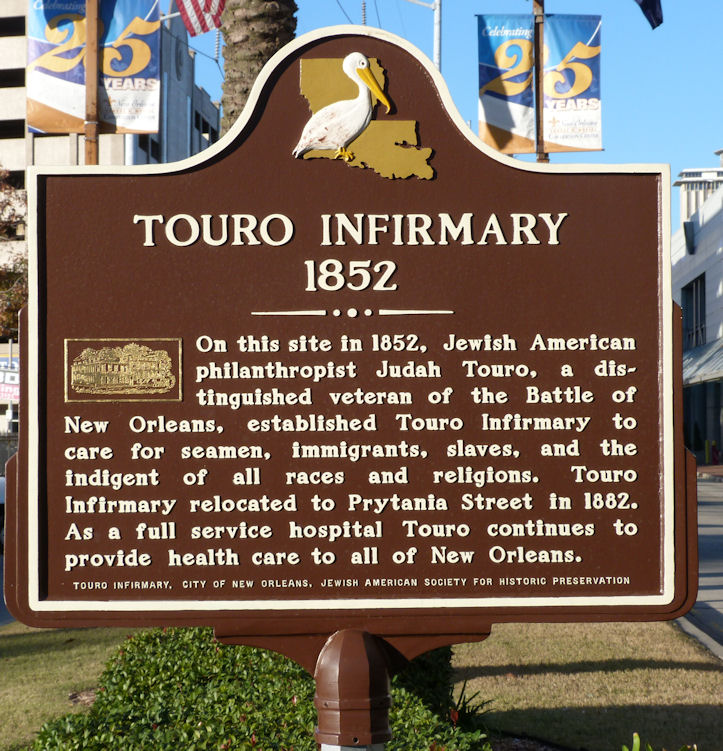
Touro Infirmary Marker

- Maine – Bangor, Congregation Beth Israel, First Permanent Jewish House of Worship - 1897

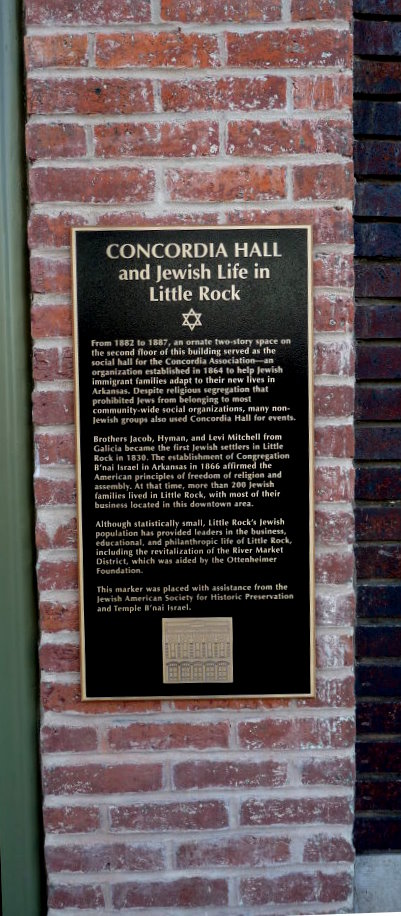
Congregation Beth Israel, Little Rock

- Maryland – Montgomery County, Sophia Chamys, victim of white slavery
- Maryland – Hagerstown, Thomas Kennedy, Jew Bill of Maryland
- Minnesota – Saint Paul, Mt. Zion Temple, first permanent Jewish House of Worship in Minnesota - 1856
- Mississippi – Jackson, Temple Beth Israel, first permanent Jewish house of worship in Mississippi - 1867
- Mississippi – Natchez, Temple B'Nai Israel, first organized Jewish house of worship in Mississippi
- Montana – Helena, Temple Emanuel, first permanent Jewish house of worship in Montana - 1890

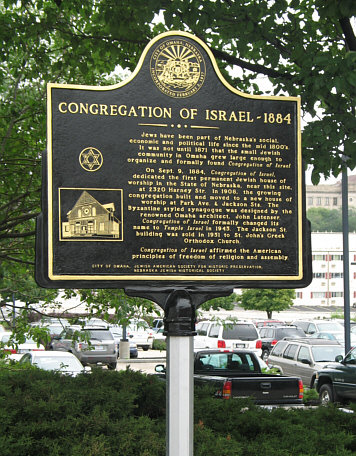
Congregation of Israel, Omaha, Nebraska

- Nebraska – Omaha, Congregation of Israel, first permanent Jewish house of worship in Nebraska - 1884
- Nevada – Virginia City
1. Engineering Marvels of the Comstock
2. Virginia City Jewish Cemetery - 1862
- New Hampshire – Portsmouth, Temple Israel, First Permanent House of Worship - 1910

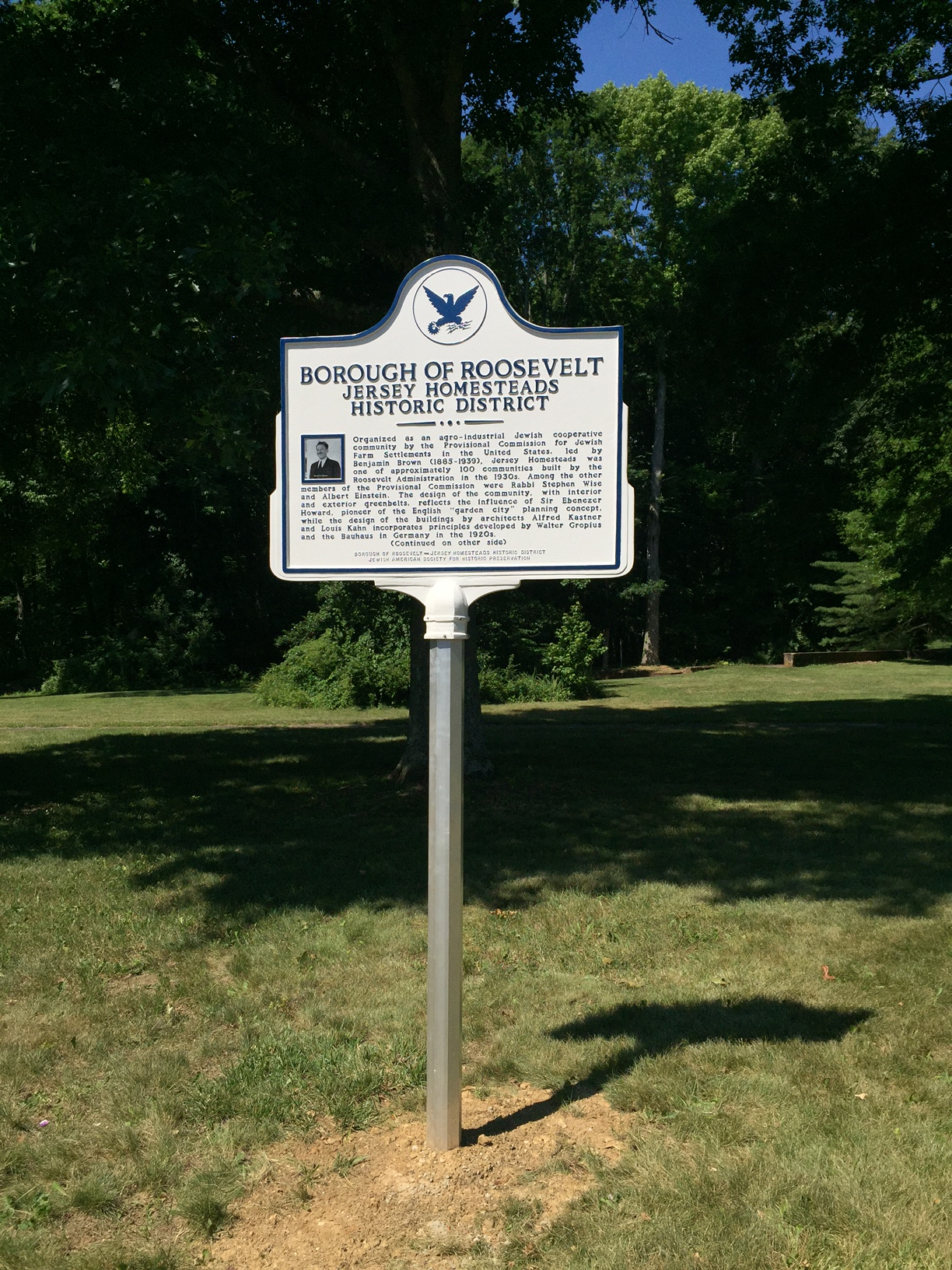
Borough of Roosevelt, Roosevelt, N.J.

- New Jersey – Roosevelt, Jersey Homesteads
- New Mexico – Las Vegas, Congregation Montefiore, First Permanent Jewish House of Worship in New Mexico - 1884
- New York – Buffalo, Mordechai Noah and Ararat

  Borscht Belt Historical Marker system - 20 markers[35]

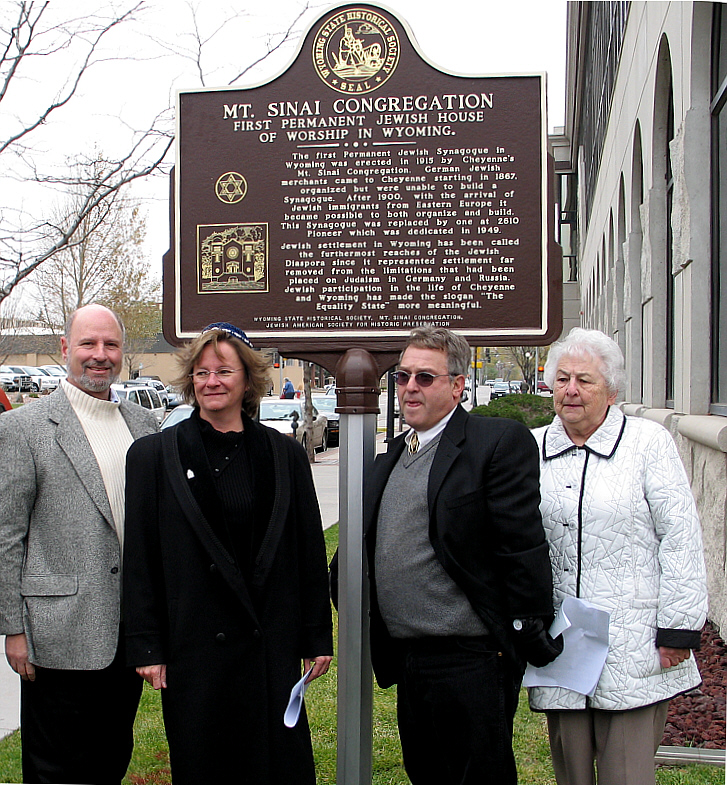
Cheyenne, Wyoming

- North Dakota – Valley City,#Herman Stern, Holocaust rescuer
- North Dakota – Ashley Jewish Cemetery, NRHP
- North Dakota – Bonanazaville, North Dakota Jewry
- Oklahoma – Oklahoma City, Temple B'Nai Israel, First Permanent Jewish House of Worship in Oklahoma - 1908
- Pennsylvania – Lancaster, Joseph Simon, Jewish American frontiersman
- South Dakota
1. Jews of Deadwood

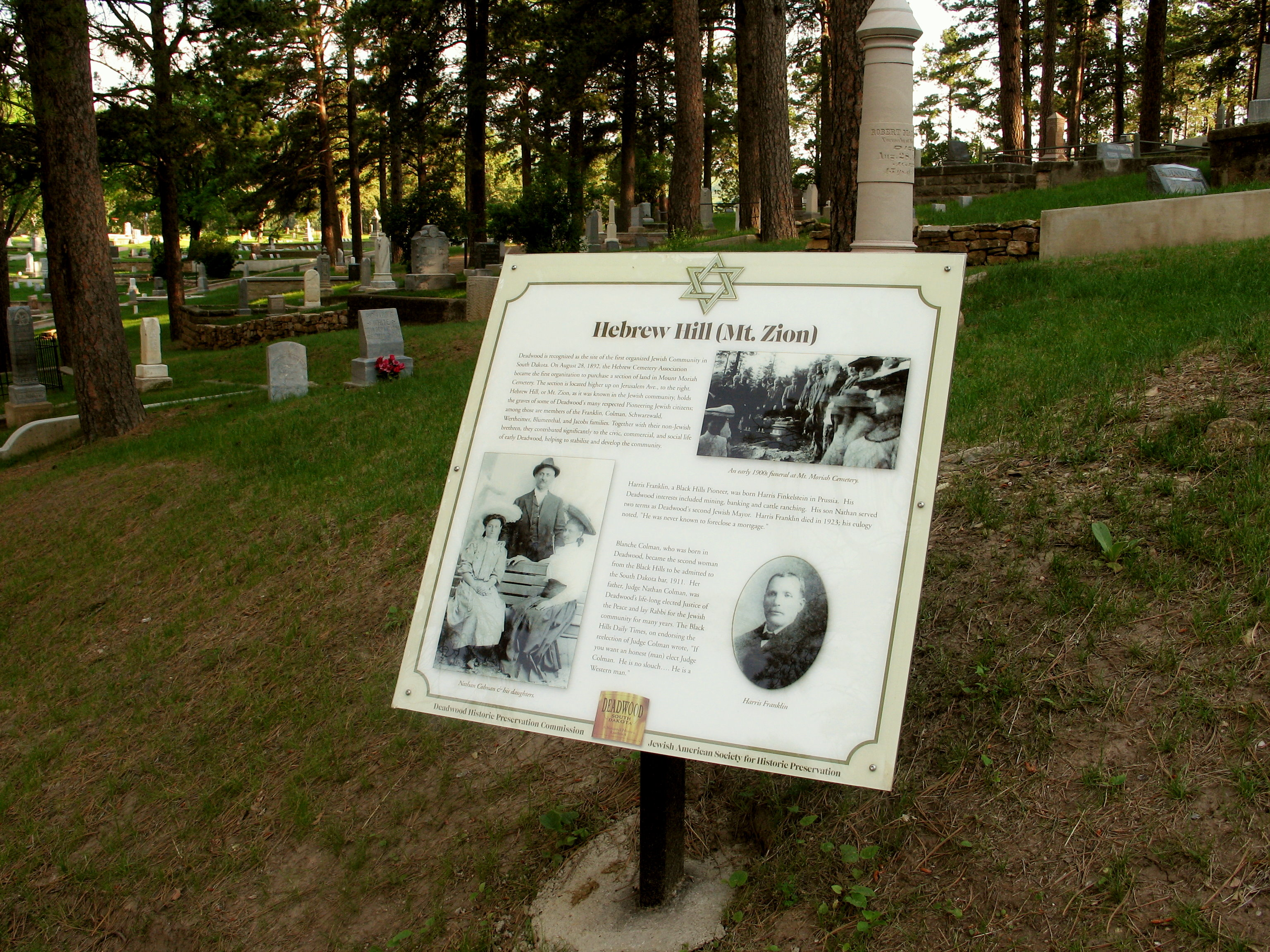
Hebrew Hill, Mt. Zion, Deadwood, S.D.

1. Mount Rushmore National Monument
2. Mount Rushmore National Monument, "Father of Mt. Rushmore"
3. Congregation Sons of Israel, Sioux Falls, First Permanent Jewish House of Worship in South Dakota - 1916
- Tennessee – 1. Memphis, Congregation Children of Israel, First Permanent Jewish House of Worship in Tennessee - 1854. 2. Knoxville, Master Sgt. Roddie Edmonds, Righteous Among the Nations for saving Jewish POWs, WWII - https://www.hmdb.org/m.asp?m=160252

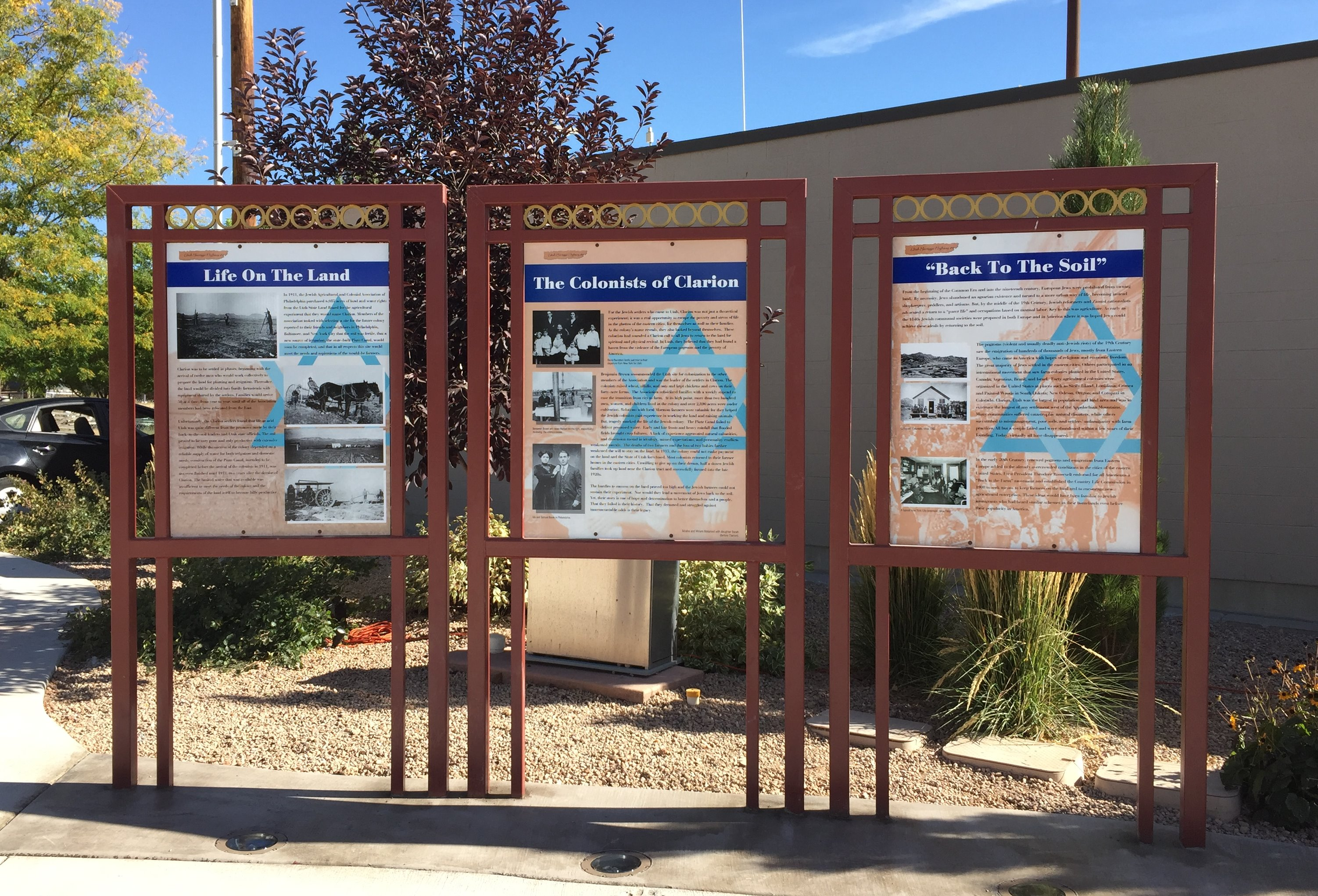
Kiosk, Clarion, Utah

- Utah, Clarion
1. Jewish Agricultural Settlement - 1911
- Utah – Salt Lake City
1. Congregation B'Nai Israel, First Permanent Jewish House of Worship in Utah - 1883
- Utah – Wild Horse Butte
1. Solomon Carvalho - John C. Fremont Expedition of exploration 1853–54
- Virginia – Richmond, Kahal Kadosh Beth Shalome, First Permanent Jewish House of Worship in Virginia - 1789
- Washington – Spokane, Temple Emanuel, First Permanent Jewish House of worship in Washington State - 1892
- West Virginia – Charleston, Temple Israel, first permanent Jewish house of worship in West Virginia - 1873
- Wyoming – Cheyenne, Mt. Sinai Congregation, first permanent Jewish house of worship in Wyoming - 1915
- British International Projects

=== Special programs ===
- Leo Frank, Marietta, Georgia
1. Leo Frank Lynching
- Stephen Norman, Jerusalem, Israel
1. The last descendant of Theodor Herzl - the father of the modern State of Israel
- Four Chaplains, Memorial - U.S. Naval Academy, Annapolis, Maryland
1. U.S. Naval Academy, Annapolis, Maryland
- Daffodils and American Holocaust Memorials
- Paramaribo, Suriname
1. Holocaust and Memory

=== International projects ===
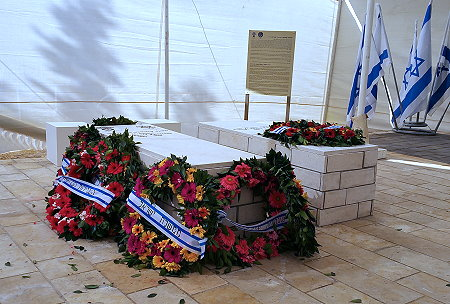
Col. John Henry Patterson, Avihayil, Israel

- John Henry Patterson, Avihayil, Israel
1. Godfather of the Israel Defense Forces
- Buchenwald Concentration Camp, Weimar, Germany
1. The "Kleine Lager" Memorial

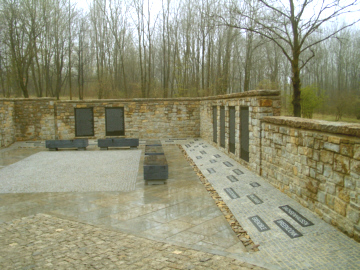
Site of the Jewish camp in Buchenwald

American Liberators marker - In Memory of the Soldiers of the XX Corps of the U.S. 3rd Army.

- Adam Worth, London, England
1. The Napoleon of Crime
- Rev. William Hechler - First Christian Zionist, London, England
- Joan Winters, Jerusalem, Israel
- Paramaribo, Suriname, Holocaust and Memory

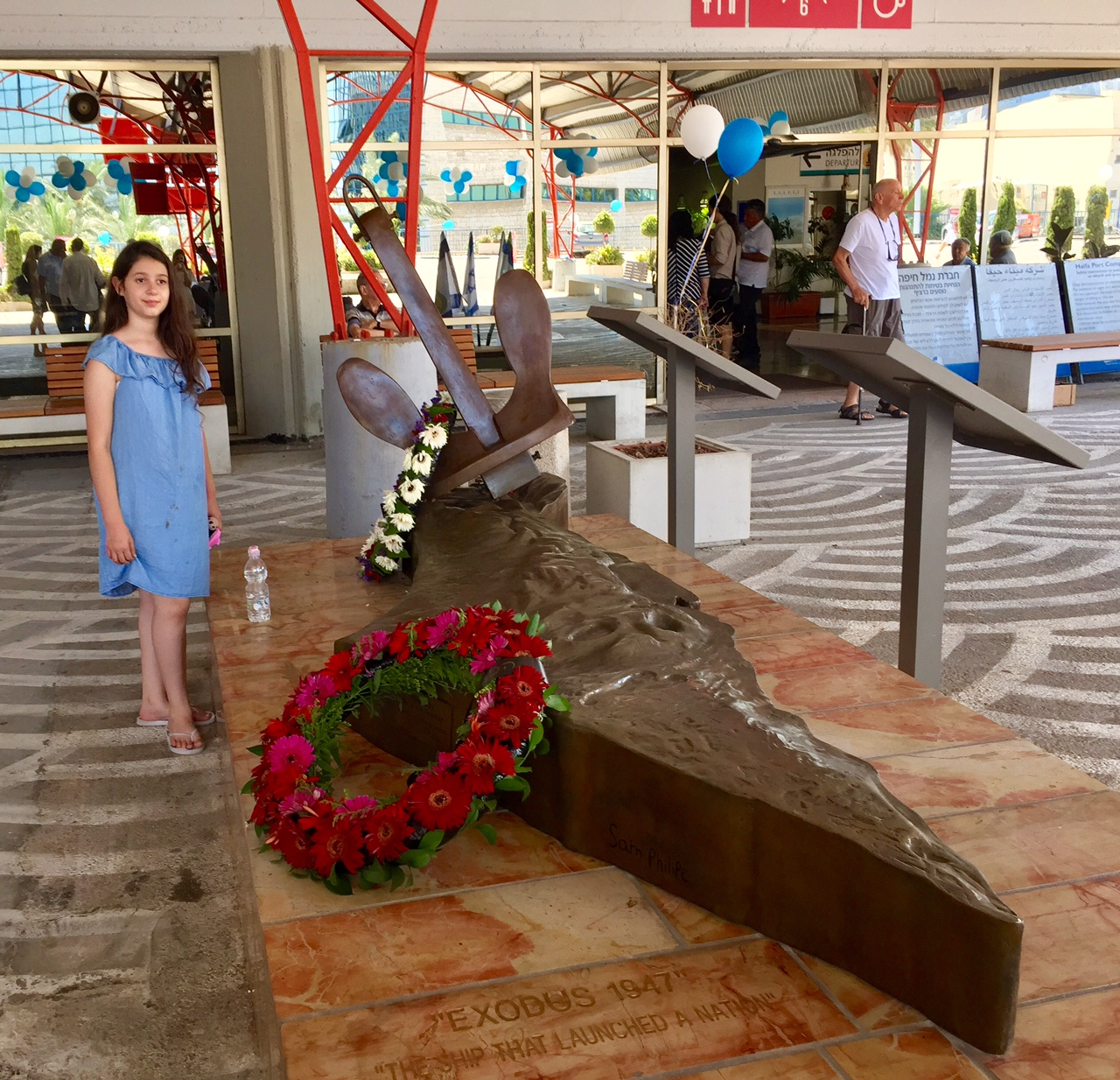
Exodus Memorial, Haifa, Israel

- SS Exodus, Haifa, Israel
1. Exodus - 1947, the iconic American Holocaust rescue ship
2. Bill Bernstein - American second officer on the Exodus murdered during the British attack

=== Charitable sponsorships ===
- Hero Miles - Fisher House Foundation

=== JASHP articles on American Jewish history ===
- Kahal HaKadosh Beit Elohim, Charleston, S.C.
- American Holocaust Memorializations
- Reverend John Stanley Grauel - Secret Haganah operative on the S.S. Exodus
- American Jewish History,
- Zionism and Israel

== See also ==
- The Jacob Rader Marcus Center of the American Jewish Archives
