= Herzl Museum =

Israeli museum

Coordinates: 31°46.349′N 35°10.890′E

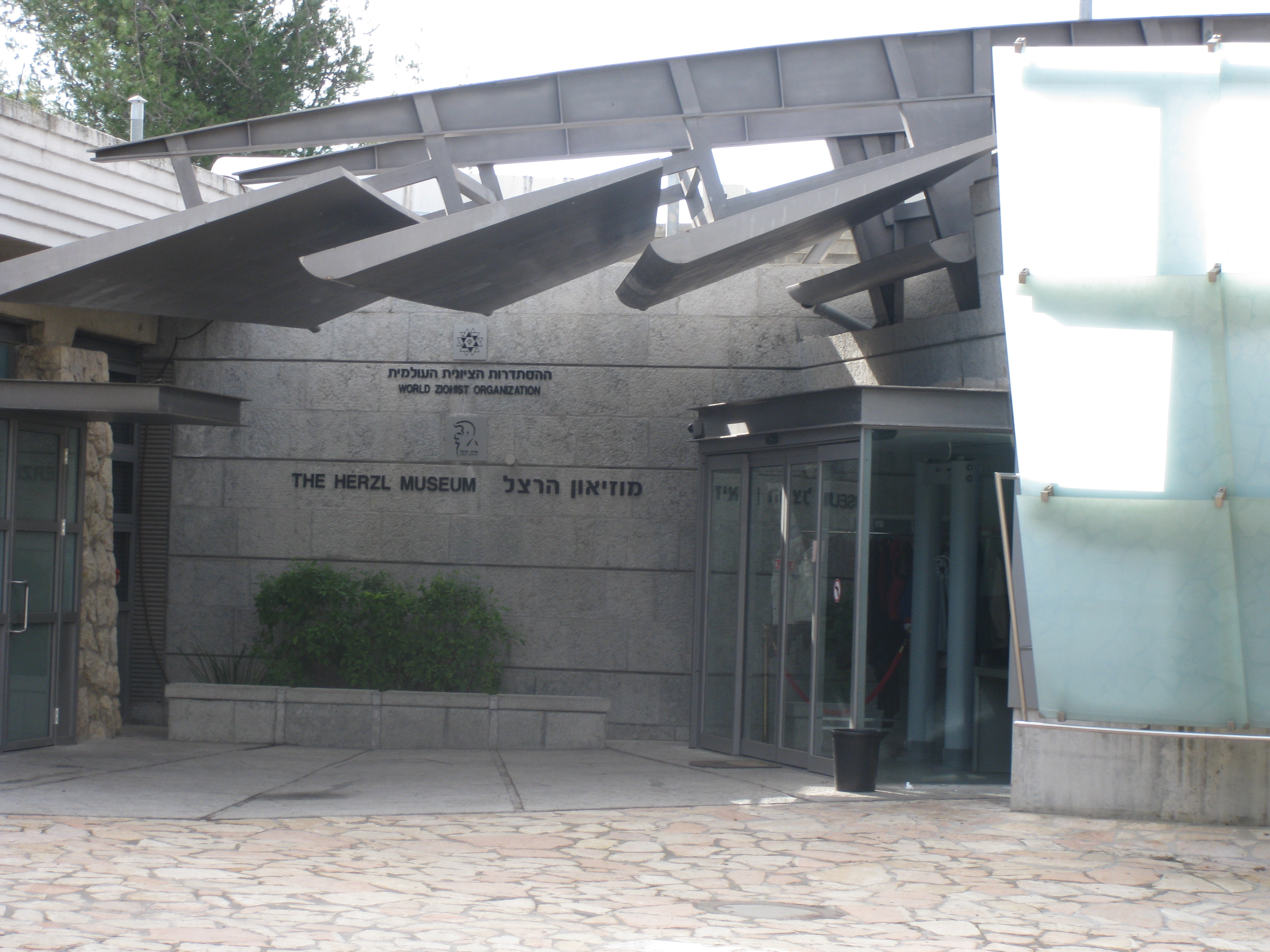
Entrance to the museum

The Herzl Museum is a museum in Jerusalem, which deals with activities and vision of Theodor Herzl. The museum is located at the main entrance plaza to Mount Herzl.

== History ==
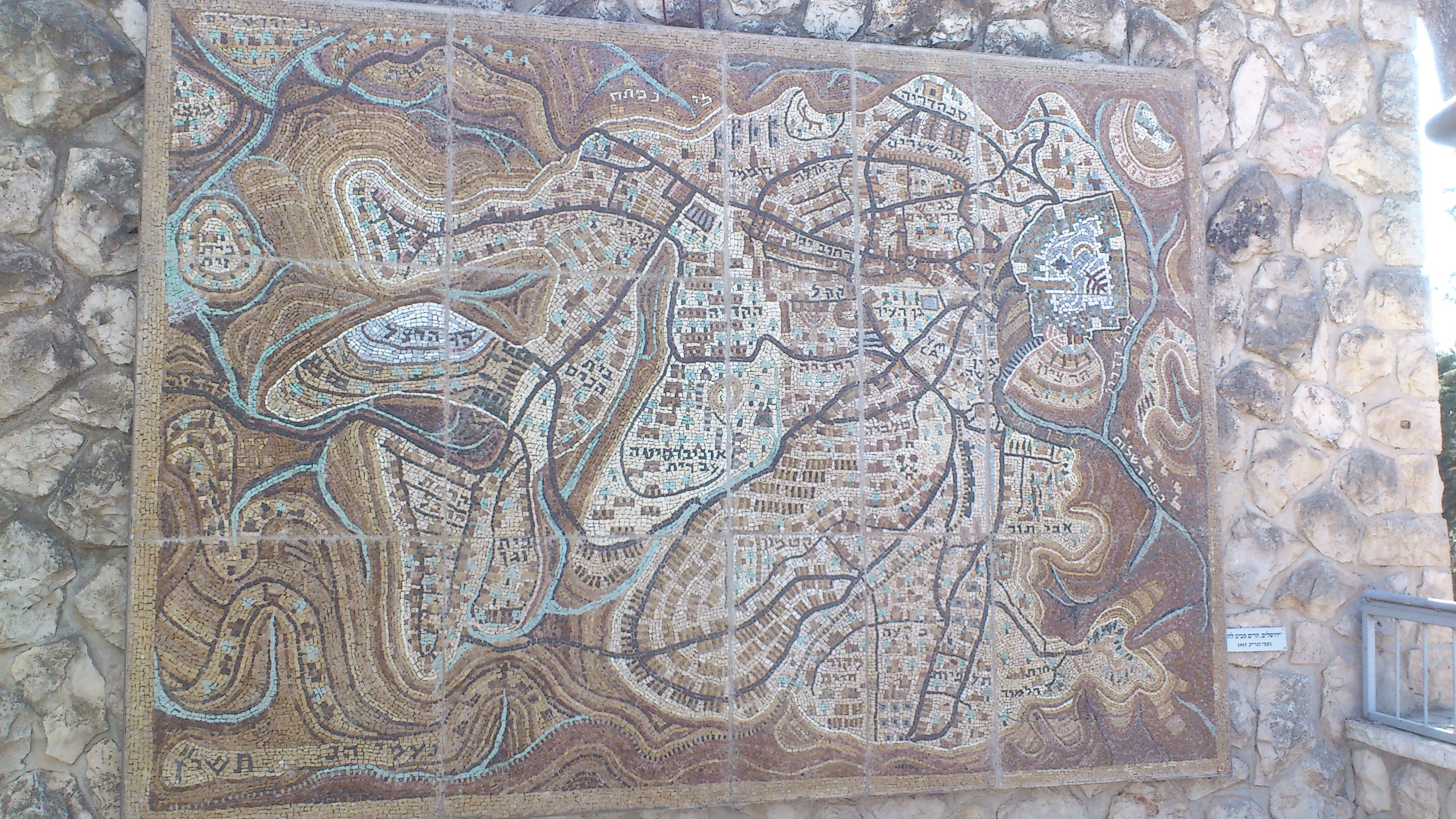
Mosaic by Naomi Henrik 1957 : "the mountains surround Jerusalem"

Shortly after Herzl's death, the Anglo–Palestine Bank acquired about 2,000 dunams (2.0 km^{2}) in south-central Palestine, where the Hulda Forest is located today, for a farm and a large building that would house the farm's management and double as a museum dedicated to Herzl. However, the museum was not created and only in 1960s one was built on Mount Herzl in Jerusalem. The museum included exhibits on Herzl's life, including a reproduction of his study in Vienna. In 2000 it was closed due to poor maintenance, but reopened in 2005, following the centenary of Herzl's death.

== Building and exhibits ==
The new museum includes four audiovisual 4D film exhibits: one about Herzl's path to Zionism, the second about his activities in the Zionist political movements, the third showcasing his study, and the fourth comparing Herzl's vision for Israel as outlined in his book The Old New Land to Israel's achievements in practice. The museum complex includes two educational centers for Zionism-related studies, one named after Aryeh Tzimuki and the other after Stella and Alexander Margolis. The museum is managed by the World Zionist Organization.

=== Norman Memorial Garden ===
Situated between the Herzl Museum and the Stella and Alexander Margulies Education Center, the Norman Garden is named for Herzl's grandson Stephen Norman. It is a place for groups and students to gather to hear about Mount Herzl. On one wall of the garden, a quote from Norman, in 1945, is inscribed: “You would be amazed at the Jewish youth in Palestine – they have the mark of freedom."
