= Mount Herzl =

National cemetery of Israel in western Jerusalem

- הַר הרצל; Har Herzl
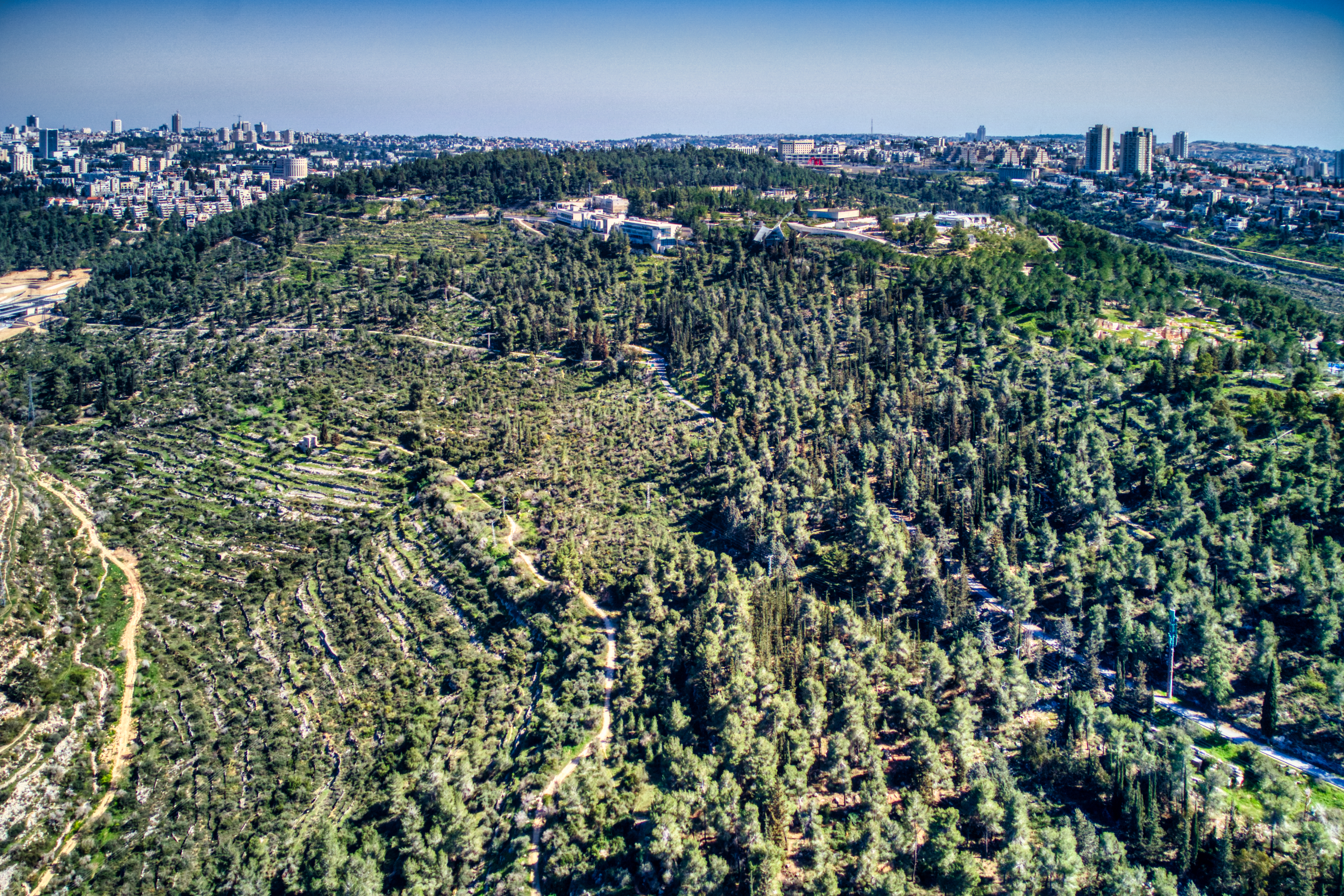

Highest point
- Elevation: 834 m (2,736 ft)
- Coordinates: 31°46′26″N 35°10′50″E

Geography

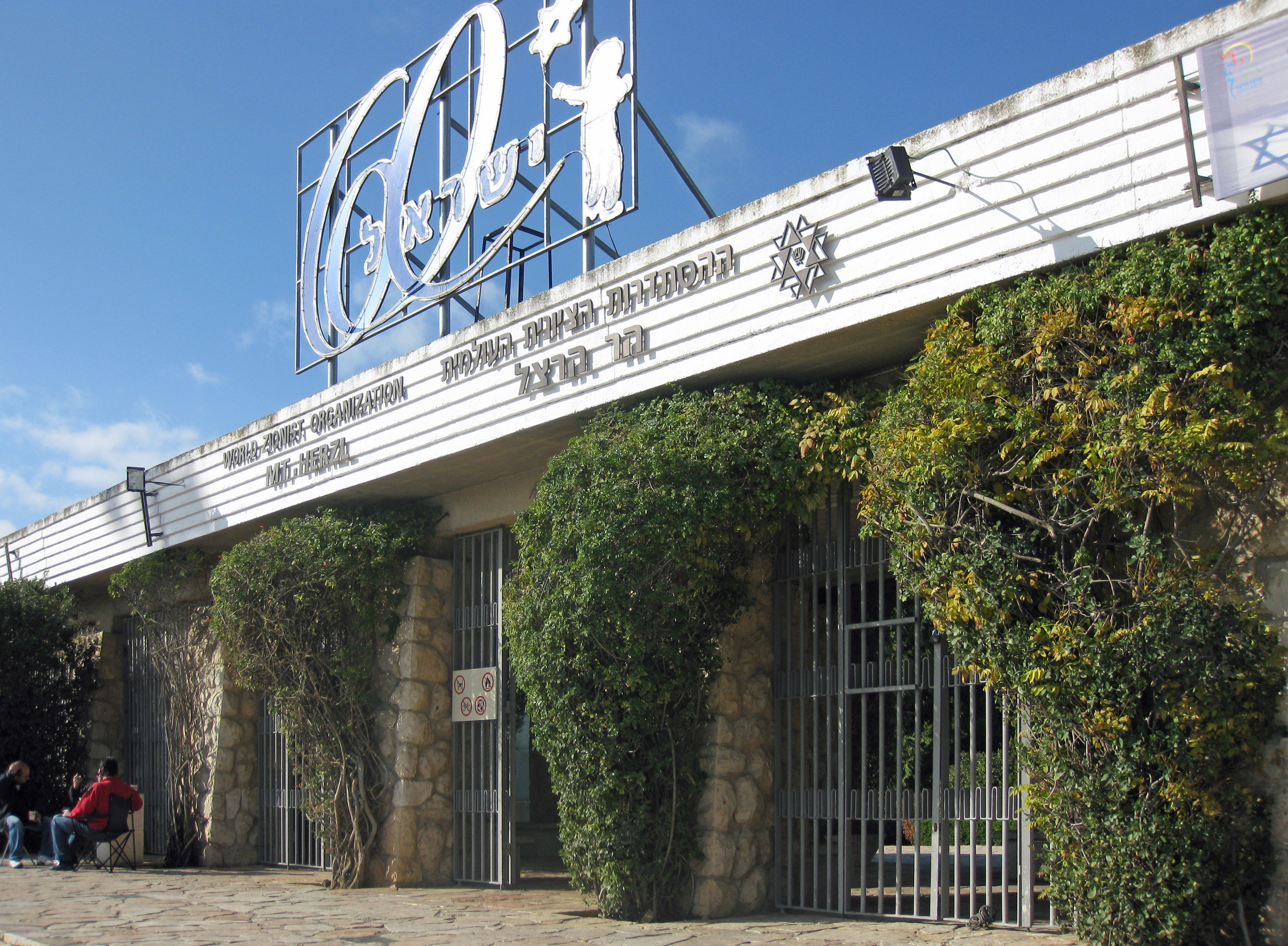
The main entrance to Mount Herzl

Mount Herzl (Hebrew: הַר הֶרְצְל, romanized: Har Hertsl), also known as Mount of Remembrance (הַר הַזִּכָּרוֹן, Har ha-Zikaron), is the site of Israel's national cemetery and other memorial and educational facilities, found on the west side of Jerusalem beside the Jerusalem Forest.

It is named after Theodor Herzl, the founder of modern Zionism. Herzl's tomb lies at the top of the hill. Yad Vashem, which commemorates the Holocaust, lies to the west of Mt. Herzl. Israel's war dead are also buried there. Mount Herzl is 834 metres (2,736 ft) above sea level.

== History ==
The primary place of honor for Jewish burials in the pre-State era was on the Mount of Olives. In 1934, Zionist leader Menahem Ussishkin organized the re-interment of Leon Pinsker in Nicanor Cave located on the grounds of the Hebrew University of Jerusalem on Mount Scopus. in an attempt to build a pantheon for the great leaders of the Jewish nation. Ussishkin was buried there himself in 1941. When Mount Scopus became an enclave, cut off from Jerusalem, the implementation of this plan was no longer feasible. The future site of Mount Herzl was chosen for the symbolism of its status as the city's tallest mountain and faced the traditional, but then inaccessible, site on the Mount of Olives.

During summer 1949, Theodor Herzl's remains were disinterred from their original location in Vienna, flown to Israel and transferred to a hill in West Jerusalem which faced the Mount of Olives from a distance and renamed in his honour, Mount Herzl. Nearly 400,000 people came out to pay their respects to Herzl as his coffin was transferred from Lod Airport and reburied in state ceremonies. In November 1949, soldiers who fell during the 1947–1949 Palestine war in the Jerusalem area were buried on the north slope of the hill, with the Defense Ministry formally establishing the site as a national cemetery.

Apart from Theodor Herzl, Mt. Herzl is the burial place of five of Israel's prime ministers: Levi Eshkol, Golda Meir, Yitzhak Shamir, Yitzhak Rabin (who is buried beside his wife Leah) and Shimon Peres. Israeli presidents are also buried on Mt. Herzl, as are other prominent Jewish and Zionist leaders.

Mt. Herzl is the venue for many commemorative events and national celebrations.

The military section was designed and landscaped by two Hungarian-born architects, Asher Hiram and Haim Giladi.

== Theodor Herzl's grave ==
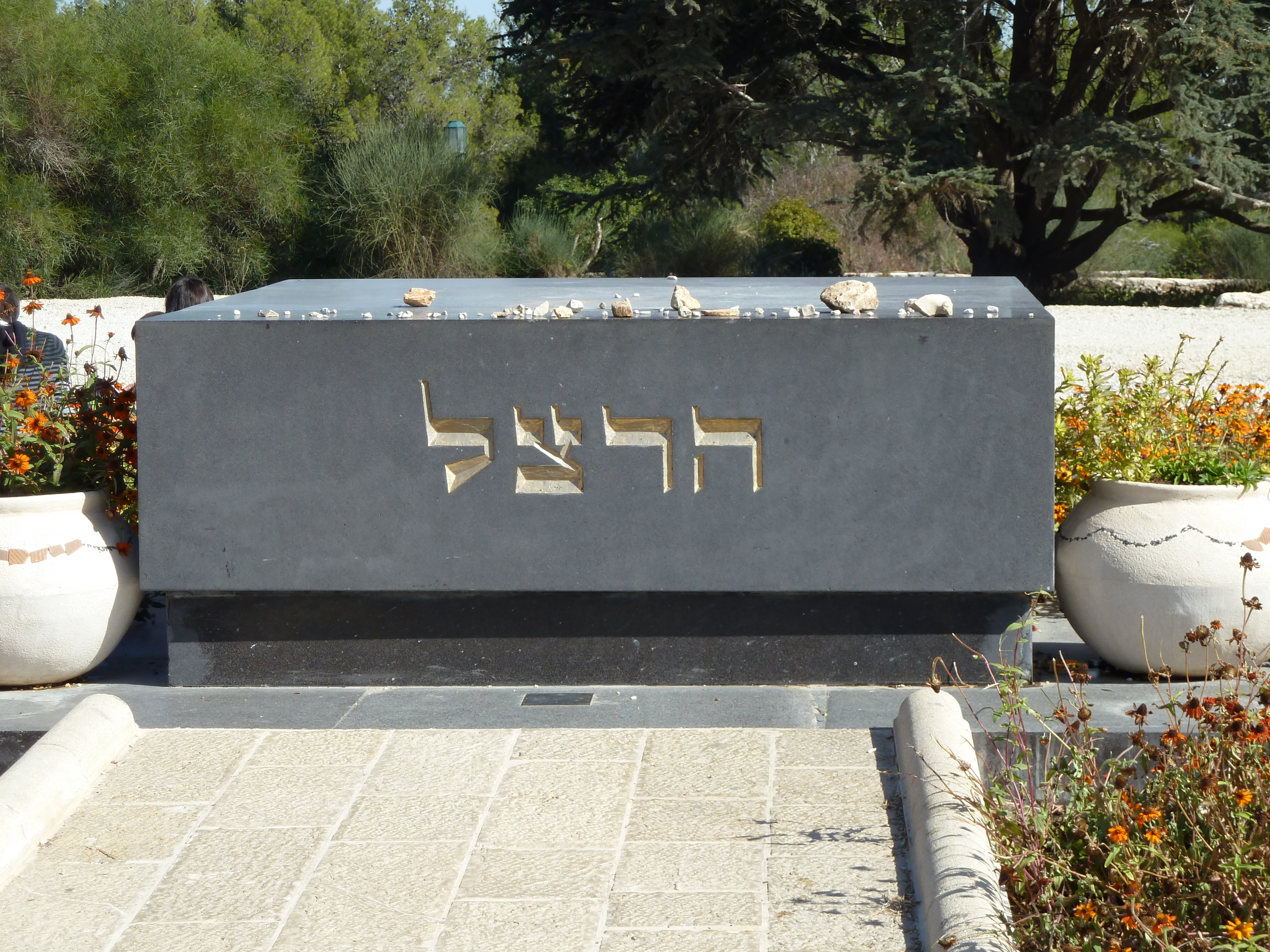
Herzl's grave on the north side of Mount Herzl plaza

In 1903, Theodor Herzl wrote in his will:

I wish to be buried in a metal coffin next to my father, and to remain there until the Jewish people will transfer my remains to Eretz Israel. The coffins of my father, my sister Pauline, and of my close relatives who will have died until then will also be transferred there.

When Herzl died a year later, he was interred in Vienna. Forty-five years later, Herzl's remains were brought to Israel and re-interred in Jerusalem. The location of the burial site was selected by a special state commission in the top of a hill in Jerusalem. He was buried on 17 August 1949. A temporary stone marked his grave for several years until the site was developed into a national cemetery. Sixty-three entries were submitted in the competition for the design of his new tombstone. The winner was Joseph Klarwein's design, consisting of an unadorned black granite stone inscribed with the name Herzl.

The area around his tomb was expanded into the plaza where the first Independence Day ceremony was held in 1950.

Despite Herzl's wishes, his daughter Pauline and son Hans were not originally buried beside him. Their remains were moved to Mt. Herzl in 2006. A third daughter was murdered in the Holocaust and her place of burial is unknown. The small Stephen Norman Park, located between the Herzl Museum and the Herzl Educational Center, is dedicated to the memory of Herzl's only grandson, who killed himself in the United States in 1946 after learning about the fate of his family during the Holocaust and being confronted with Jewish misery in the Displaced Persons camps, and was reinterred on Mt. Herzl in December 2007. Herzl's parents and sister are also buried at Mount Herzl.

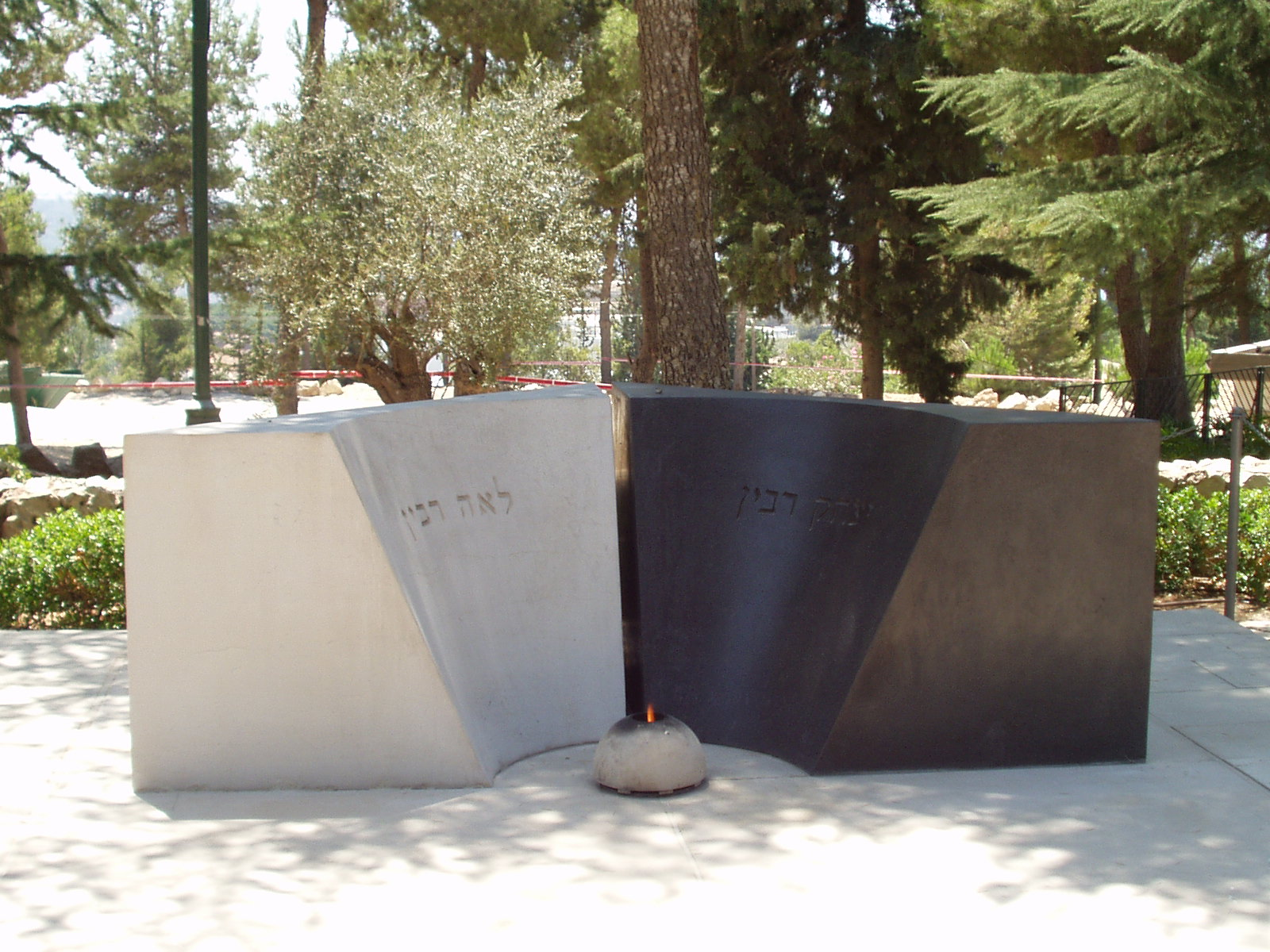
Yitzhak and Leah Rabin's graves in the National Leaders section

== National Civil Cemetery ==
Israel's main cemetery for the leaders of the country and people who sacrificed their lives for the country is located on the southern slope of Mt. Herzl, established there in 1952 when Ben Gurion decided to bury the finance minister in Helkat Gedolei Ha'Uma, close to Herzl's grave. The design of the cemetery area was continued over the following years when other famous people from the Zionist movement were brought to be buried there.

=== Great Leaders of the Nation ===
The Great Leaders of the Nation's Plot or Memorial Park holds the graves of several Prime Ministers, Presidents, Knesset speakers and other chosen national leaders of the State of Israel. It forms a separate section of the Mount Herzl cemetery from that of the leaders of the Zionist Organization (after 1960: World Zionist Organization), which is situated nearby.

The Hebrew name Helkat Gedolei Ha'Uma (Hebrew: חלקת גדולי האומה) is used in common parlance either in a narrower meaning, for the State of Israel leaders' section, or in a wider one, which includes pre-state Zionist leaders.

Buried there are Presidents Zalman Shazar and Chaim Herzog, Shimon Peres and Prime Ministers Levi Eshkol, Golda Meir, Yitzhak Rabin and his wife Leah Rabin. Other notable graves are those of the first speaker of the Knesset, Yosef Sprinzak and his wife Hanna, the first Minister of Finance, Eliezer Kaplan, Jerusalem mayor Teddy Kollek, and First Lady Aura Herzog. Despite the national significance of the cemetery, some Israeli leaders were buried elsewhere, most notably Chaim Weizmann (buried at Weizmann House), Yitzhak Ben-Zvi (buried at Har HaMenuchot Cemetery); David Ben-Gurion (buried at Midreshet Ben-Gurion); Menachem Begin (buried at Mount of Olives) and Ariel Sharon (buried at his home in the Negev).

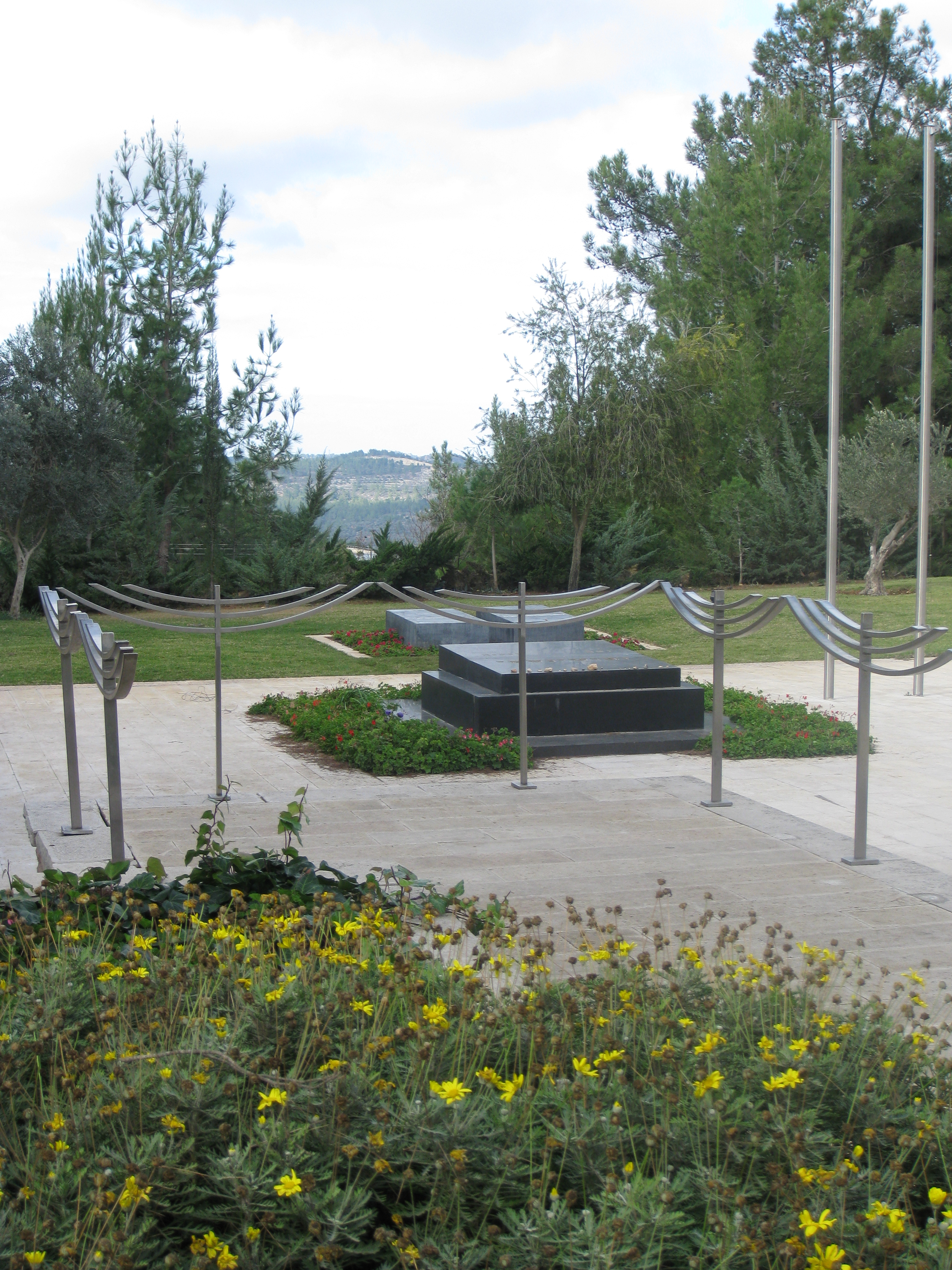
Graves of Lt. Ze'ev Jabotinsky and his wife in Mount Herzl

Deciding who should be buried on Mt. Herzl has sometimes been controversial. For example, the decision to bury Ze'ev Jabotinsky, who died in 1940, on Mt. Herzl, was fiercely opposed by many Labour Party stalwarts, who claimed that Jabotinsky was an ultra-right nationalist undeserving of such an honour. Only in 1964 did Prime Minister Levi Eshkol decide in favor of burying him there, in the interest of promoting national reconciliation and setting aside political grievances. Soldiers awarded with the Medal of Valor may also be buried at Mount Herzl.

To the north of Herzl's grave is a plot reserved for the leaders of the (World) Zionist Organization, among them David Wolffsohn, Nahum Sokolow, Simcha Dinitz, and Arieh Dulzin. In the same section are the graves and cenotaphs of close relatives of Theodor Herzl.

The grave of Ze'ev Jabotinsky and his family is in a separate plot southwest of Herzl's grave.

=== Victims of Acts of Terror Memorial ===
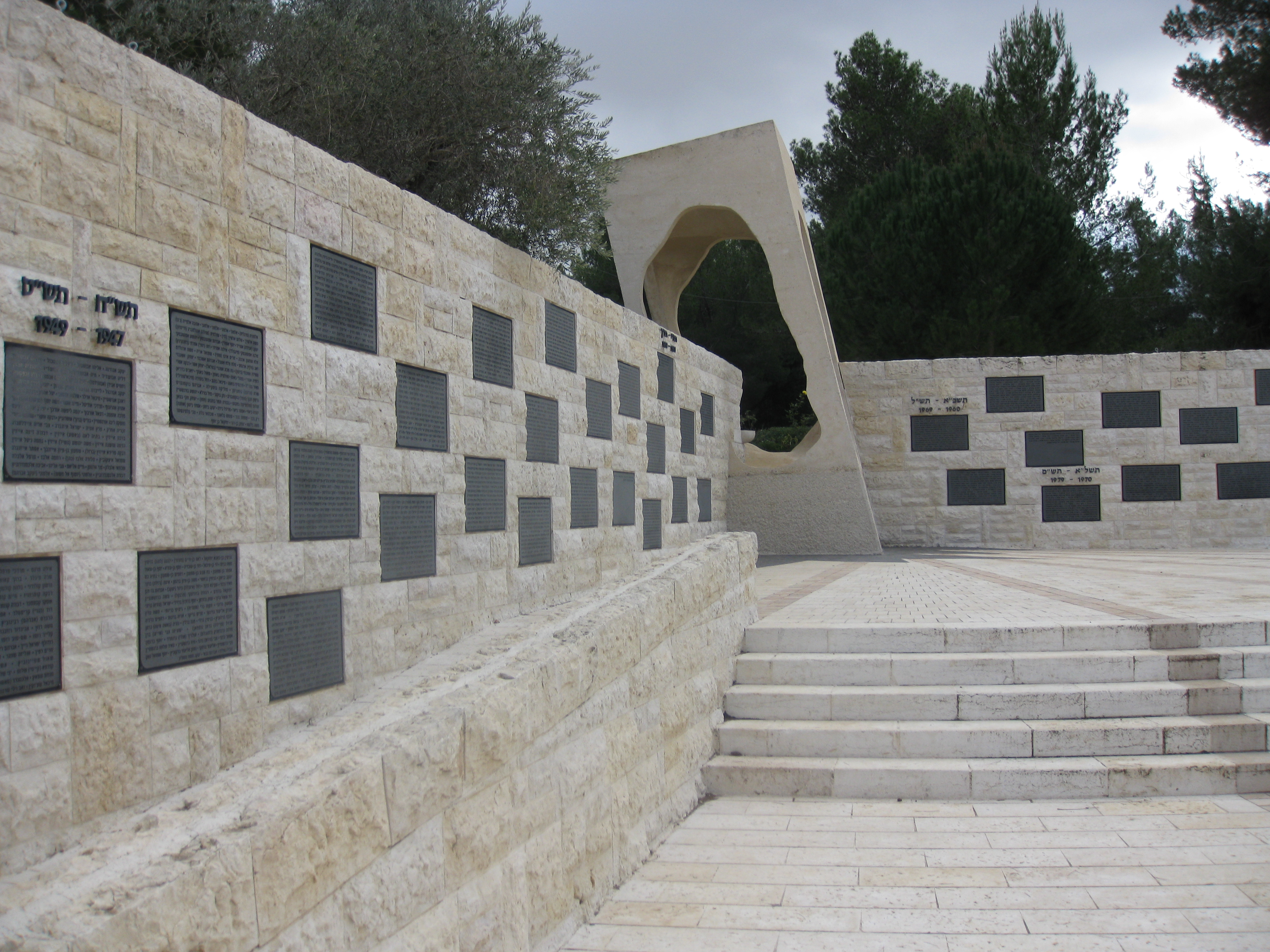
Victims of Acts of Terror Memorial

The Victims of Acts of Terror Memorial is the main memorial for all victims of terrorism in Israel from 1851 until today. The memorial was opened in 1997, and every year a ceremony is held on the plaza, in memory of the victims of terror. The memorial is located in the National Civil Cemetery next to Helkat Gedolei Ha'Uma.

=== Other memorials ===
- Olei Hagardom plot: Jewish underground fighters executed for their activities
- Common grave of the 204 illegal immigrants who went down with the Salvador in December 1940
- Common grave of the 44 immigrants aboard the Egoz (sank in 1961)
- Memorial for the Last of Kin – last Holocaust survivors of their families, who died fighting in the Israel Defense Forces
- Memorial for the Jewish immigrants from Ethiopia

== National military cemetery ==
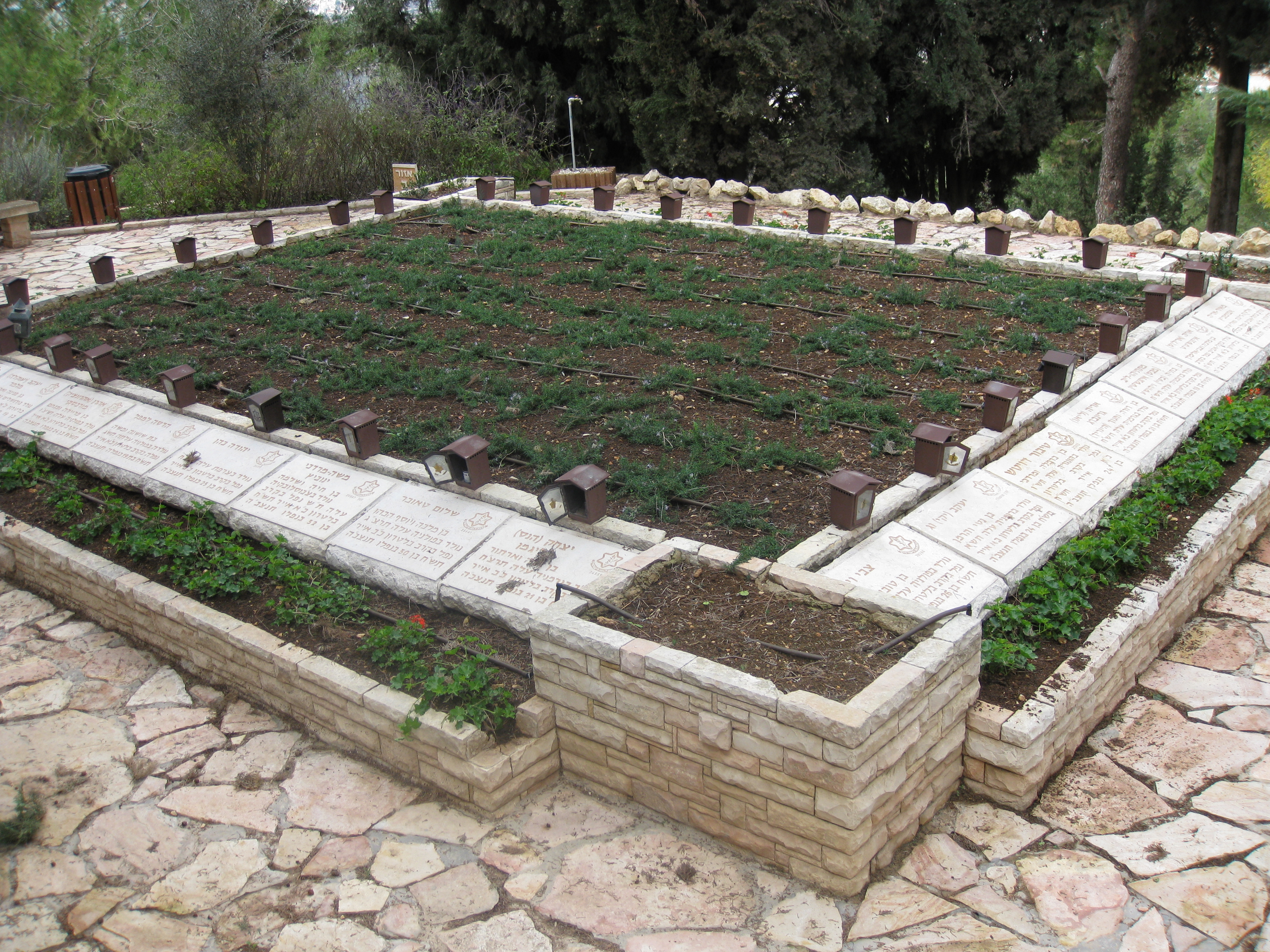
In October 1949 those who were killed in the Latrun Battles were buried in this mass grave at Mount Herzel Military Cemetery

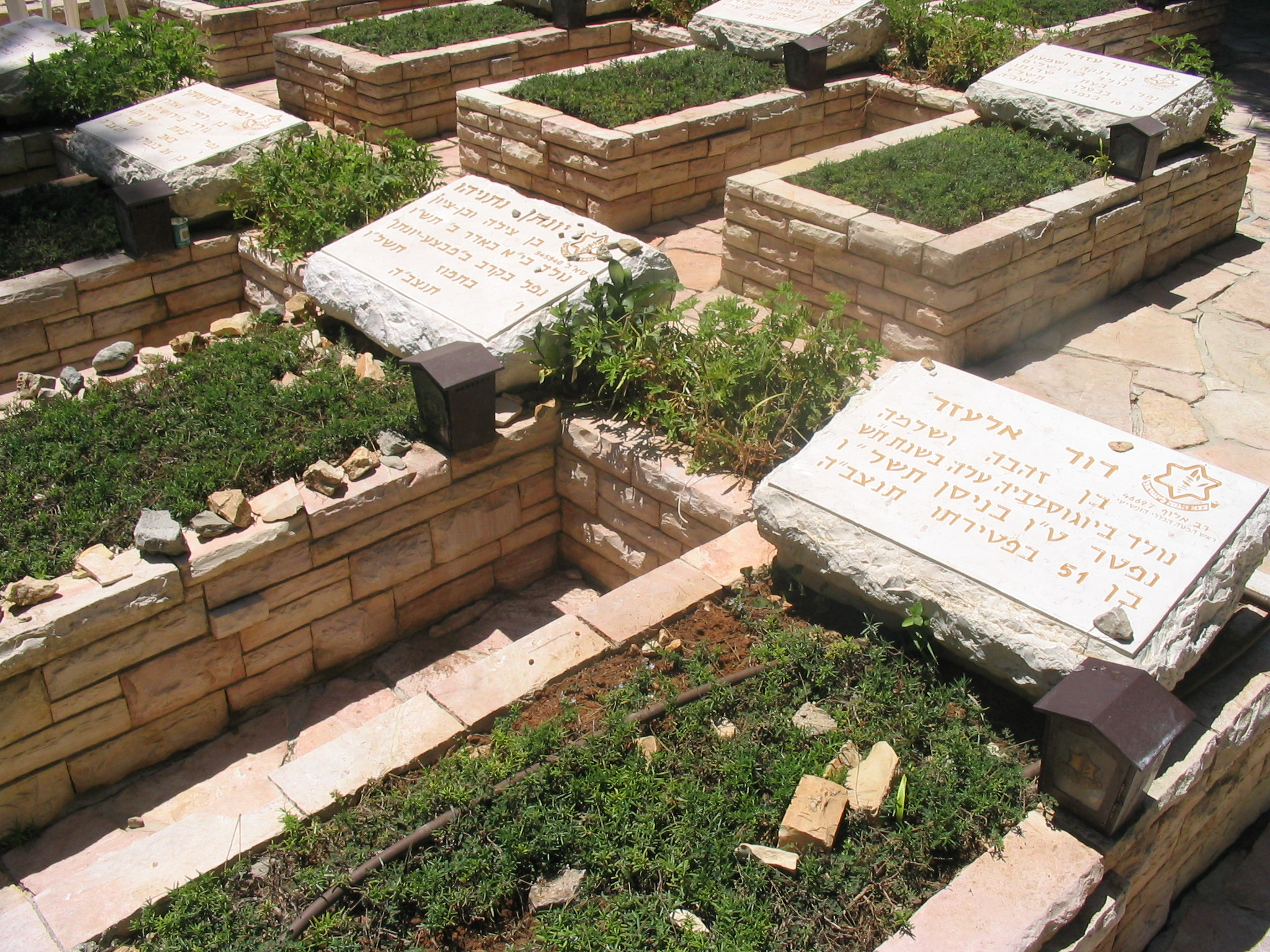
General David Elazar's grave in Mount Herzl

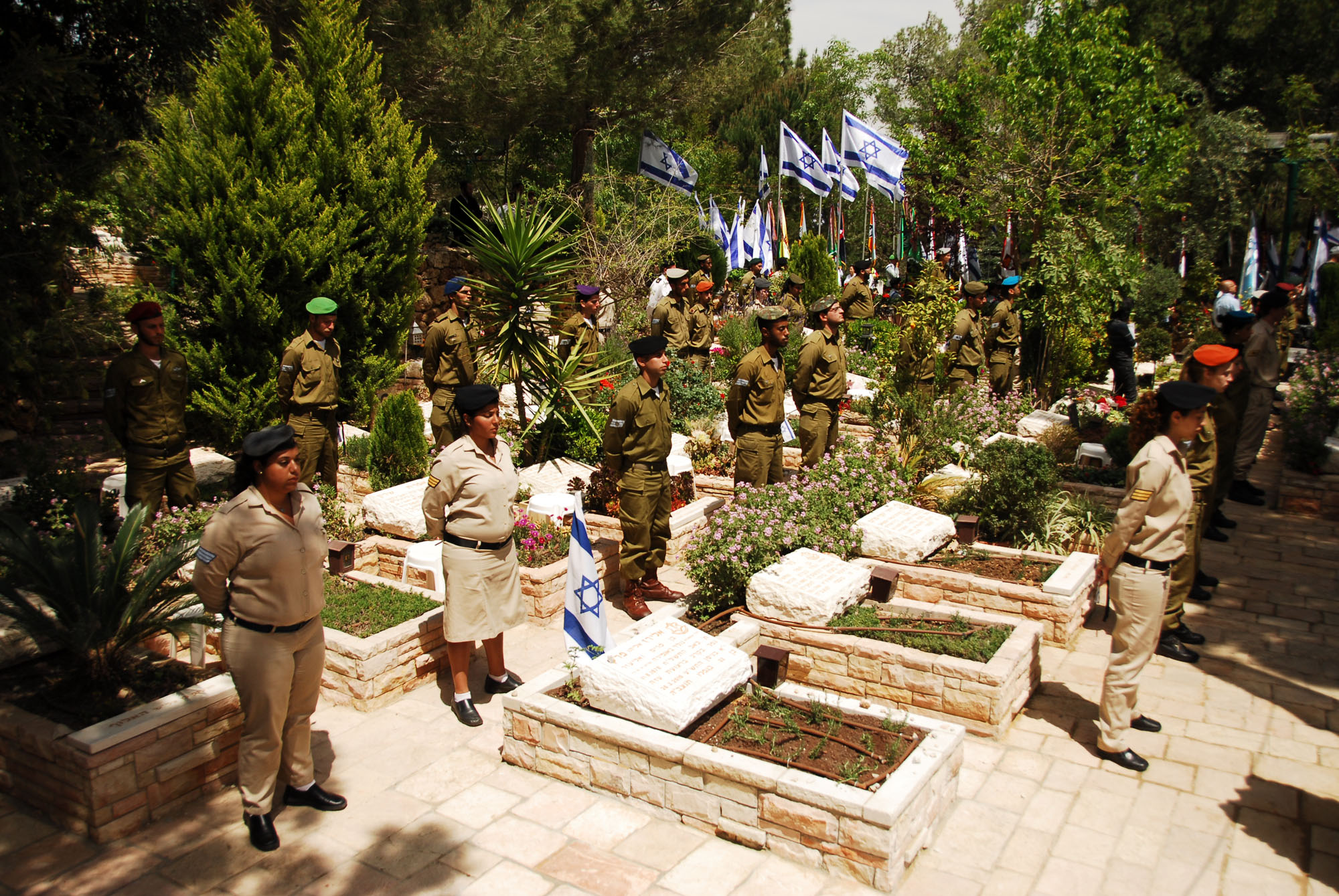
Ceremony at Mt. Herzl military cemetery, 2010

The main Israel Defense Forces cemetery is located on the northern slope of Mt. Herzl. It was established in November 1949, when soldiers who fell in the Jerusalem area were buried there. In 1949, the government decided to turn the site into the main cemetery for IDF members who have fallen in the line of duty. The Israel Police cemetery, for police officers who have fallen in the line of duty, is also located there.

There are specific areas or monuments for the following categories of fallen fighters:

- National Memorial Hall For Israel's Fallen
- Garden of the Missing in Action (burial places are unknown)
- Memorial for the Jewish soldiers in the Red Army in World War II
- Memorial for the Jewish soldiers in the Polish Army in World War II
- Memorial for the volunteers of the Yishuv (Jewish community in Palestine) in World War II
- Memorial for the 140 Jewish Palestinian soldiers who went down with the British ship SS Erinpura in 1943 during World War II
- Memorial for the 23 (in Hebrew numerals: Kaf-Gimel) Palmach sea commandoes who disappeared during Operation Boatswain under British command in 1941
- Common grave of the Nabi Daniel Convoy of 27 March 1948 (15 dead)
- Monument for the fallen fighters of the Jewish Quarter of the Old City of Jerusalem (surrendered on 28 May 1948)
- Memorial for the 69 sailors who went down with the Dakar submarine in 1968 and whose bodies were never recovered
- Common grave of the defenders of Neve Yaakov who fell in 1948
- Common grave of the fighters fallen in the Battles of Latrun of 1948
- Common grave of the Radar Hill fighters
- Common grave of the defenders of Kfar Etzion and the victims of the Kfar Etzion massacre who fell in May 1948. In October 1949, Rabbi Shlomo Goren had been given permission by Jordanian officials to search the site of the four destroyed Gush Etzion communities and found bodies that had nor been properly buried, despite the claims of Arab officials that they had been interred days after they were killed. An estimated half of the 100,000 Jewish residents of Jerusalem lined the path of the procession on November 17, 1949, in which the bodies of the victims were buried in a common grave on Mount Herzl.
- Common grave of the Convoy of 35 of January 1948
- Memorial for the Jewish Parachutists of Mandate Palestine killed in Europe in World War II
- Operation Kadesh (1956) plot
- Operation Peace for Galilee (First Lebanon War, 1982) plot
- Soldiers who fell since 1990
- Six-Day War, one of several plots
- Yom Kippur War, one of several plots

All soldiers, regardless of rank or unit, are buried side by side. The gravestones are plain and unadorned, only recording name, rank, parents' names, and place and date of birth and death.

The military cemetery also honours the memory of Israel's fallen Christian, Muslim, and Druze soldiers who have served in the Israeli security forces.

=== Garden of the Missing in Action ===
The Garden of the Missing in Action is a Tomb of the Unknown Soldier Memorial and Memory Garden for soldiers of the Israel Defense Forces and those who fought for the pre-state Land of Israel whose resting places are unknown from 1914 until today. The garden was established on 29 February 2004 in a ceremony attended by army chiefs, the Israeli Defense Minister Shaul Mofaz, and members of the Jerusalem Municipality at the National Military and Police cemetery. The garden also contains memorials to those lost aboard the submarine INS Dakar and the 23 Who Went Down at Sea.

An annual memorial service for the Missing Soldiers of Israel takes place in the garden's main plaza on Seventh of Adar day.

The garden includes "empty graves" and stone monuments to the memory of missing soldiers. At the entrance to the garden, there is a small plaza where memorial ceremonies to the missing are held. On the north side of the plaza there is a memorial to the missing sailors of the INS Dakar submarine, which sank in the Mediterranean sea. On the north side of the plaza is a memorial wall bearing the names of all missing soldiers and fighters from 1914 until today. On the top of the wall there is a waterfall.

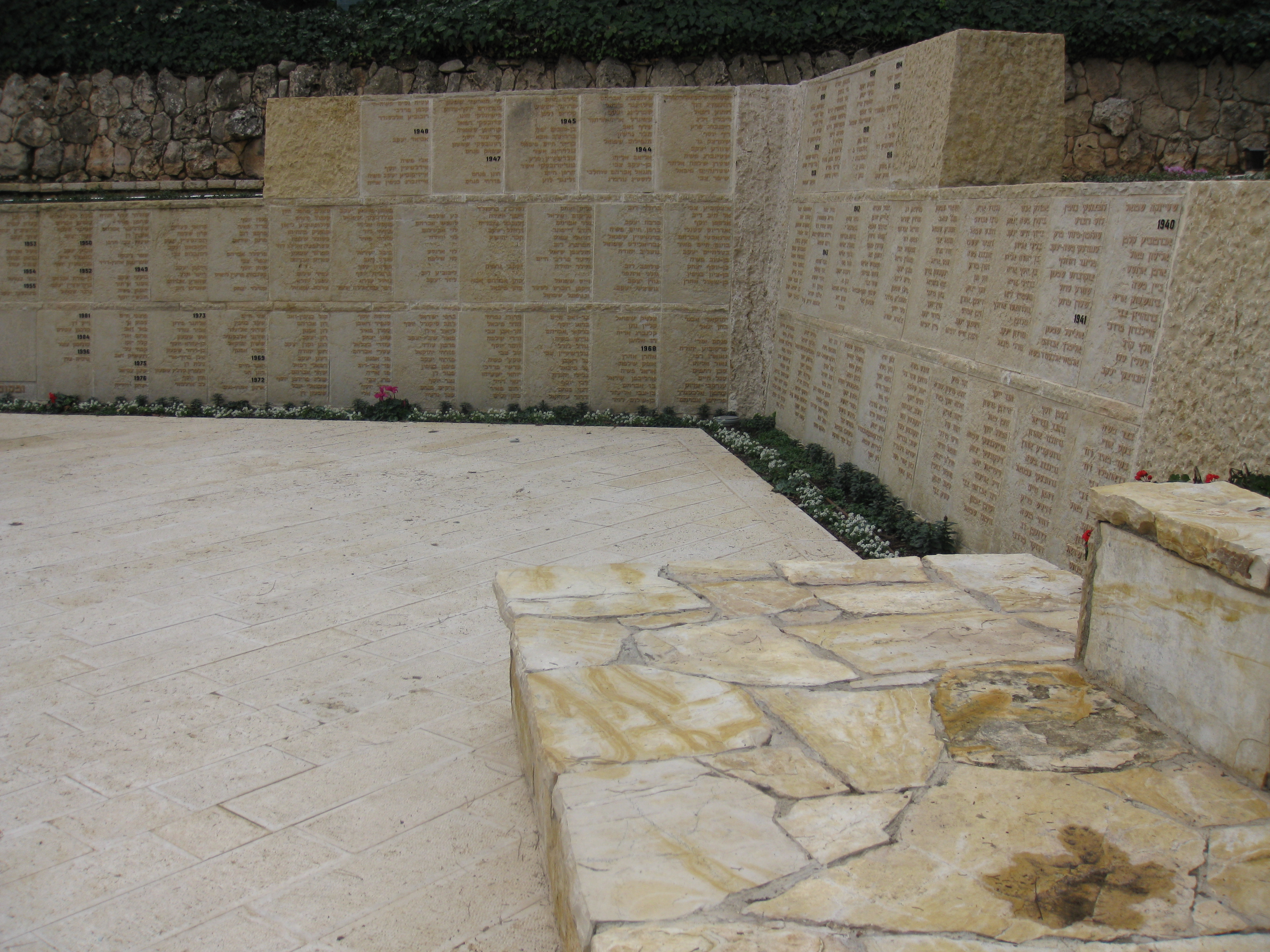
The memorial wall listing the names of the Missing Warriors and Soldiers of Israel

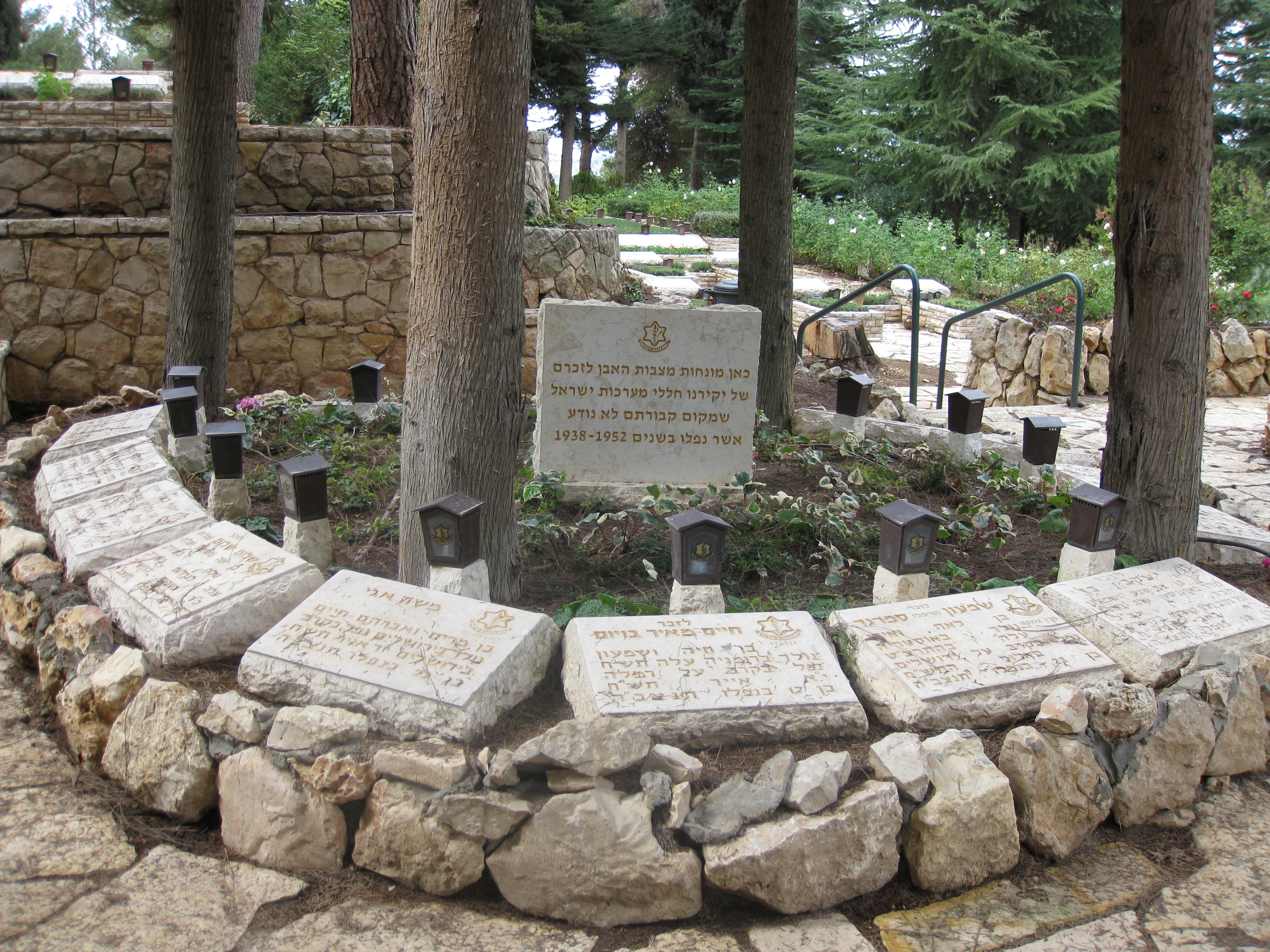
Empty graves with memorial stones.

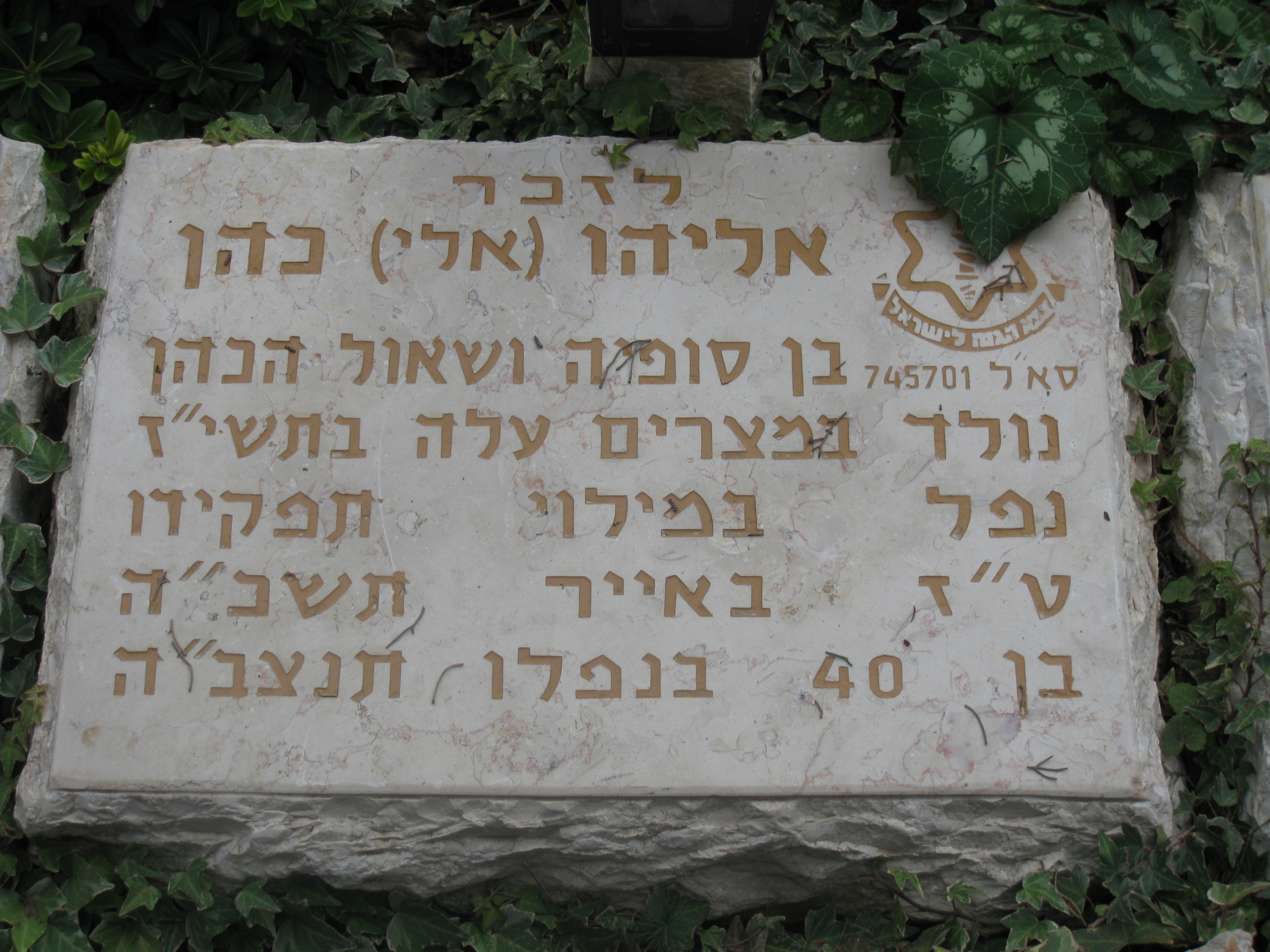
Memorial for Eli Cohen.

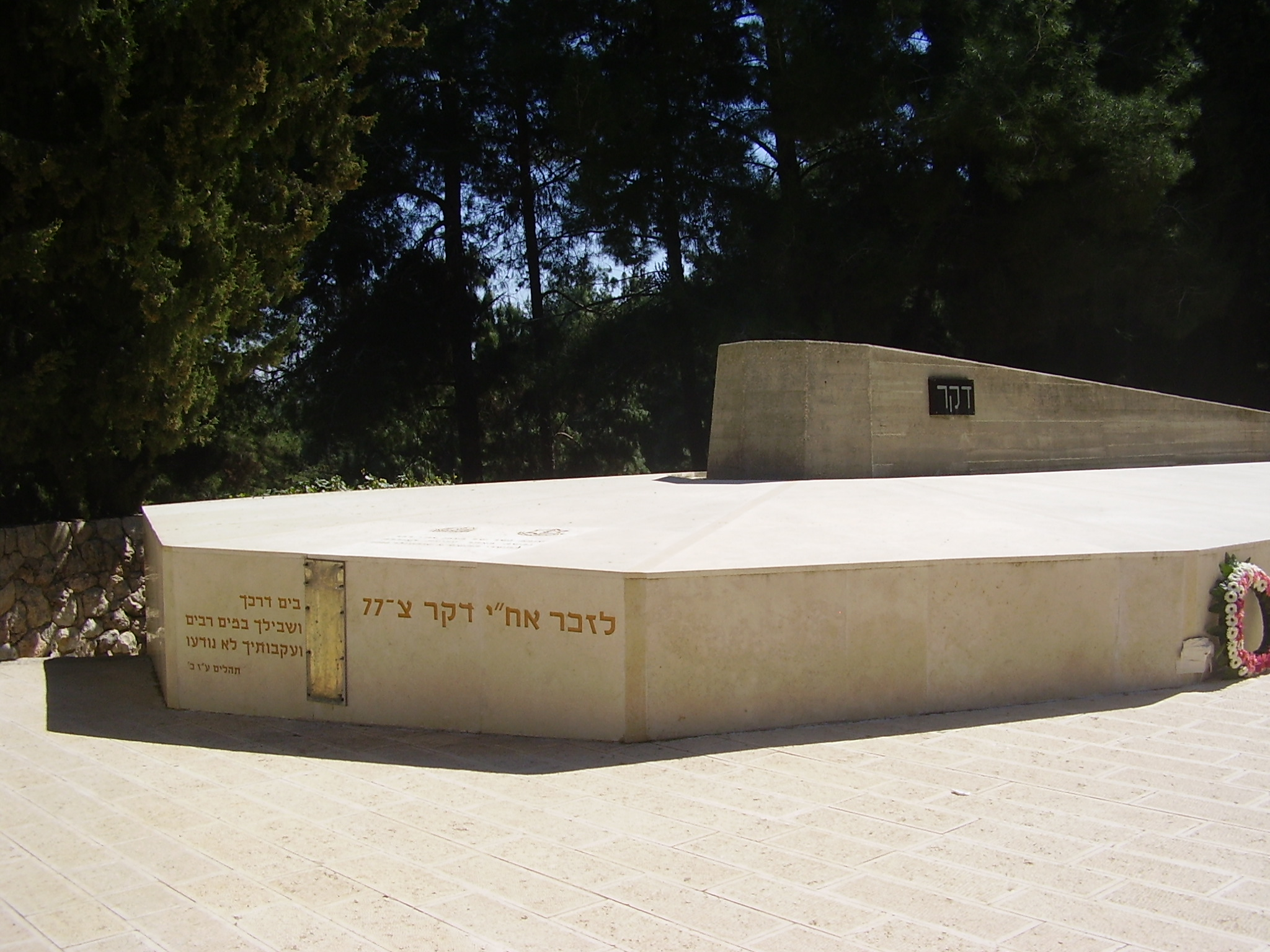
Memorials to those lost aboard the submarine INS Dakar

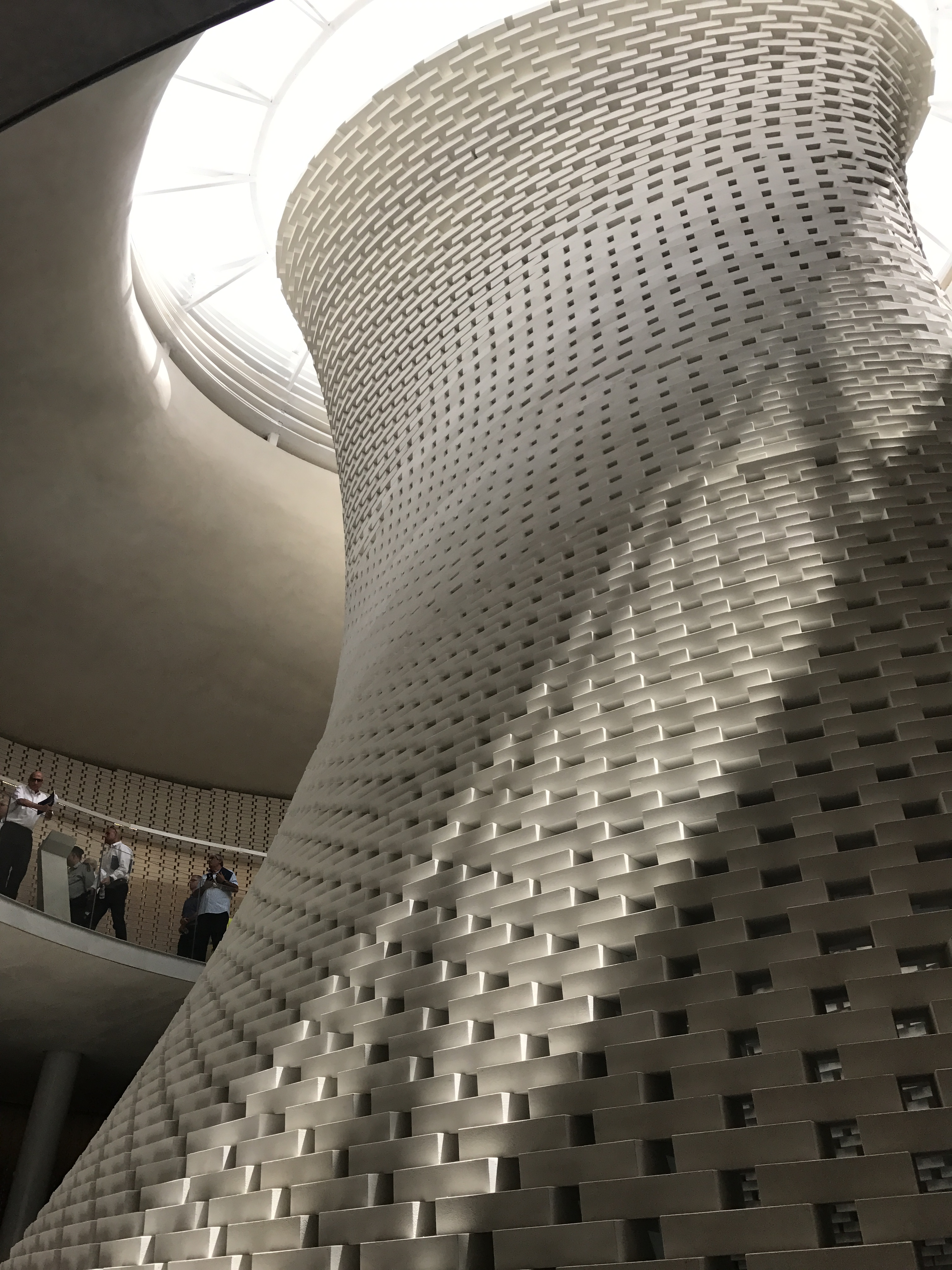
National Memorial Hall For Israel's Fallen

=== National Memorial Hall For Israel's Fallen ===
A national memorial hall was built at the entrance to the National Military and Police cemetery to honour the memory of the 22,684 soldiers and security personnel who have fallen defending the land of Israel since 1860. It is designed in the shape of a torch rising some 18 meters and an eternal flame burns there all year long. A candle for each soldier is lit twice a year – once on the anniversary of the soldier's death, and on Memorial Day. The cost of the project was NIS40 million.

== Gardens ==
Above the Herzl Museum and the main plaza is the Nations Garden, where trees have been planted by visiting presidents and heads of state. There are two small observation decks looking out over Jerusalem. A menorah sculpture stands opposite the main plaza entrance.

Situated between the Herzl Museum and the Stella and Alexander Margulies Education Center, the Stephen Norman Garden is named for Herzl's grandson, Stephen Norman. He was the only member of Herzl's family to visit Palestine or to be a Zionist. It is a place for groups and students to gather to hear about Mount Herzl. On one wall of the garden, a quote from Norman, in 1945, is inscribed: "You will be amazed at the Jewish youth in Palestine...they have the look of freedom."

== Museums and study centers ==
=== Herzl Museum ===
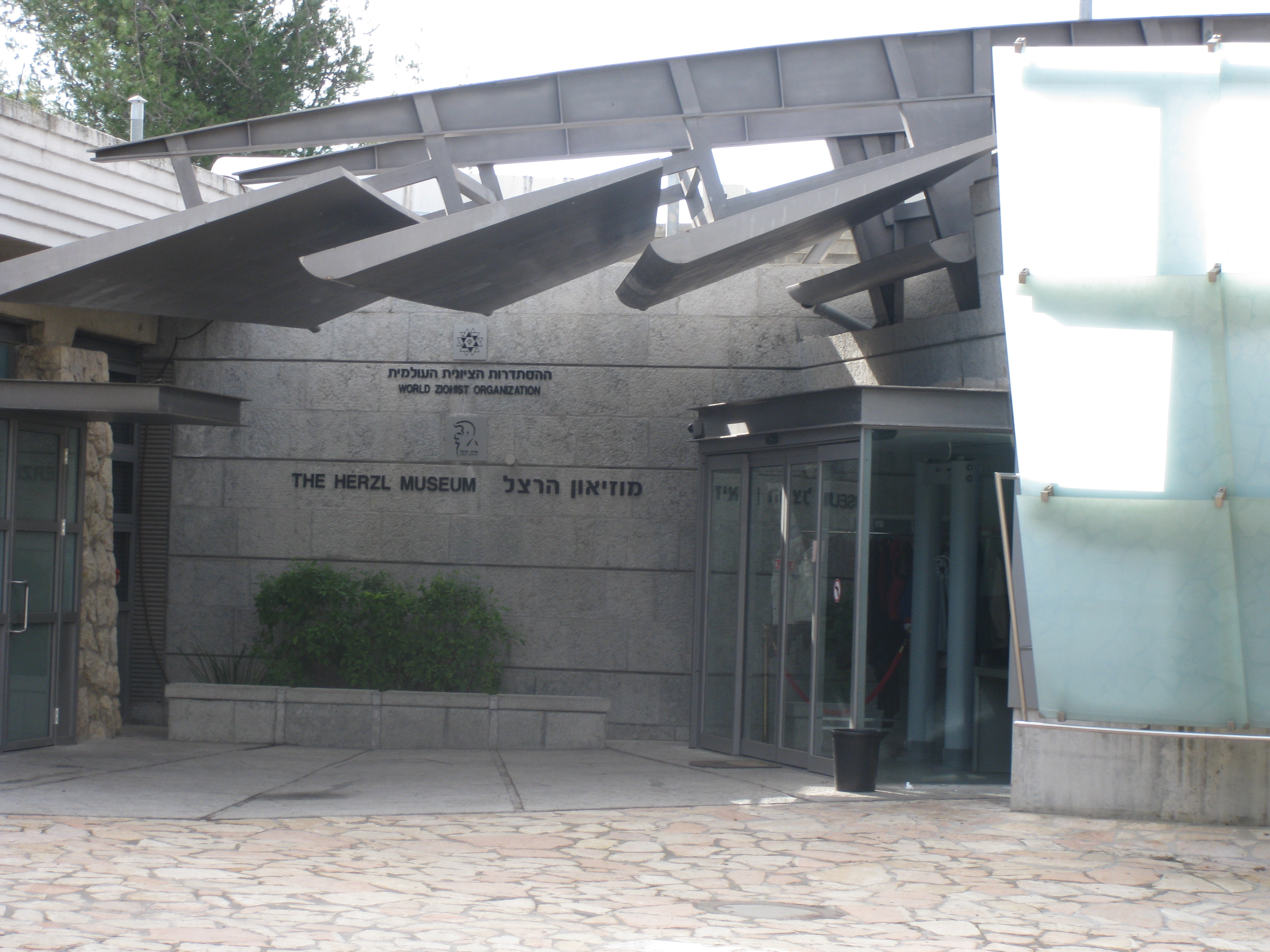
Entrance to Herzl museum

Herzl Museum, an interactive museum at the main entrance to Mt. Herzl, offers a glimpse into the life of Theodor Herzl, the man behind the dream of a Jewish homeland.

=== Yad Vashem ===
Yad Vashem is in the western region of Mount Herzl on the Mount of Remembrance in Jerusalem, 804 meters above sea level and adjacent to the Jerusalem Forest. Yad Vashem is complex containing two types of sites - memorial museums and monuments, and a research institute. Memorial sites include the Holocaust History Museum and the Museum of Holocaust Art; indoor memorials such as the Children's Memorial and the Hall of Remembrance; outdoor commemorative sites such as the Valley of the Communities, the Cattle Car memorial and various sculptures; and a synagogue. The Holocaust research facilities are grouped around a research institute and include archives, a library, publishing house and an educational center, The International School for Holocaust Studies. Yad Vashem honours non-Jews who saved Jews during the Holocaust, at great personal risk, as the "Righteous among the Nations".

The Memorial Path, leading from the entrance of Yad Vashem up to the Mount Herzl national cemetery, was established in 2003 and includes plaques that mark important events from the beginning of Zionism until the creation of the state of Israel.

=== Zionism study center ===
In 2010, work began on a Zionism Studies Center next to the Herzl museum, with the opening scheduled for 2013.

== Archaeology ==
Mitspe Karem (Hebrew: מִצְפֶּה כֶּרֶם) is an archaeological park located in the Jerusalem Forest on the west side of the Mount of Remembrance, near the Yad Vashem museum. There are finds from various periods, including the Early Bronze Age, Iron Age, possibly Hellenistic, Roman, and Byzantine period.

== Official ceremonies on Mount Herzl ==
- Memorial Day ceremony for Israel's Fallen Soldiers
- Memorial Day Ceremony for Victims of Terrorism, held at the memorial of terror in Israel
- Seventh of Adar ceremony for fallen soldiers whose resting place is unknown, held in Garden of the Missing Soldiers
- Independence Day ceremony, held at Mount Herzl Plaza
- Holocaust Remembrance Day ceremony at Yad Vashem

== See also ==
- List of memorials and monuments at Mount Herzl
- List of National Cemeteries by country
