= Stephen Norman =

Grandson of Theodor Herzl (1918–1946)

Stephen Norman

Stephen Norman (born Stephan Theodor Neumann; 21 April 1918 – 26 November 1946), was an Austrian captain in the British Army during World War II, Zionist activist, and the grandson of the founder of Zionism, Theodor Herzl.

== Biography ==
Stephen Neumann (later Norman) was born in Austria. His parents feared for the safety of their only child as anti-Semitism became more prevalent in Austria in the 1930s. His father Richard Neumann requested from the Viennese Zionists and the Zionist Executive in Palestine, to send his son to England in 1935, for his safety.

While in England, he read extensively about his grandfather, Theodor Herzl. Zionism had not been a significant part of his background in Austria. He was the only descendant of Theodor Herzl to be a Zionist. Anglicizing his name to Stephen Norman, during World War II Norman enlisted in the British Army rising to the rank of Captain in the Royal Artillery. In late 1945 and early 1946, he visited the British Mandate of Palestine "to see what my grandfather had started."

He wrote in his diary extensively about his trip. What impressed him the most was that there was a "look of freedom" in the faces of the children, not like the sallow look of those from the concentration camps of Europe. He wrote upon leaving Palestine, "My visit to Palestine is over... It is said that to go away is to die a little. And I know that when I went away from Eretz Israel, I died a little. But sure, then, to return is somehow to be reborn. And I will return."

== After World War II ==
Norman planned to return to Palestine following his military discharge. The Zionist Executive, through Dr. L. Lauterbach had worked for years to get Norman to come to Palestine. Operation Agatha of June 29, 1946, precluded that possibility: British military and police fanned out throughout Palestine and arrested Jewish activists. In July 1946, Norman wrote to Mrs. Stybovitz-Kahn in Haifa. Her father, Jacob Kahn, had been a good friend of Herzl and a well known Dutch banker before the war. Norman wrote "I intend to go to Palestine on a long visit in the future, in fact as soon as passport & permit regulations permit. But the dreadful news of the last two days have done nothing to make this easier." He never did return to Palestine.

Demobilized from the British army in late spring 1946, without any money or a job and despondent about his future, Norman followed the advice of the Dr. Selig Brodetsky. Brodetsky was Chaim Weizmann's principal ally and supporter in Britain. The editor, Dr. H. Rosenblum, of Haboker, a Tel Aviv newspaper that later became Yedioth Ahronoth, noted in late 1945, that Dr. Weizmann deeply resented the sudden intrusion and reception of Norman when he arrived in Britain. Norman spoke to the Zionist conference in London. Haboker reported, "Something similar happened at the Zionist conference in London. The Chairman suddenly announced to the meeting that in the hall there was Herzl's grandson who wanted to say a few words. The introduction was made in an absolutely dry and official way. It was felt that the chairman looked for - and found - some stylistic formula which would satisfy the visitor without appearing too cordial to anybody among the audience. In spite of that there was a great thrill in the hall when Mr. Norman mounted on the platform of the praesidium. At the moment, Dr. Weizmann turned his back on the speaker and remained in this bodily and mental attitude until the guest had finished his speech."

The 1945 article went on to note that Norman was snubbed by Weizmann and by some in Palestine during his visit because of ego, jealousy, vanity and their own personal ambitions. Norman secured, through influence, a very desirable, but minor position with the British Economic and Scientific mission in Washington, D.C.

== Death ==
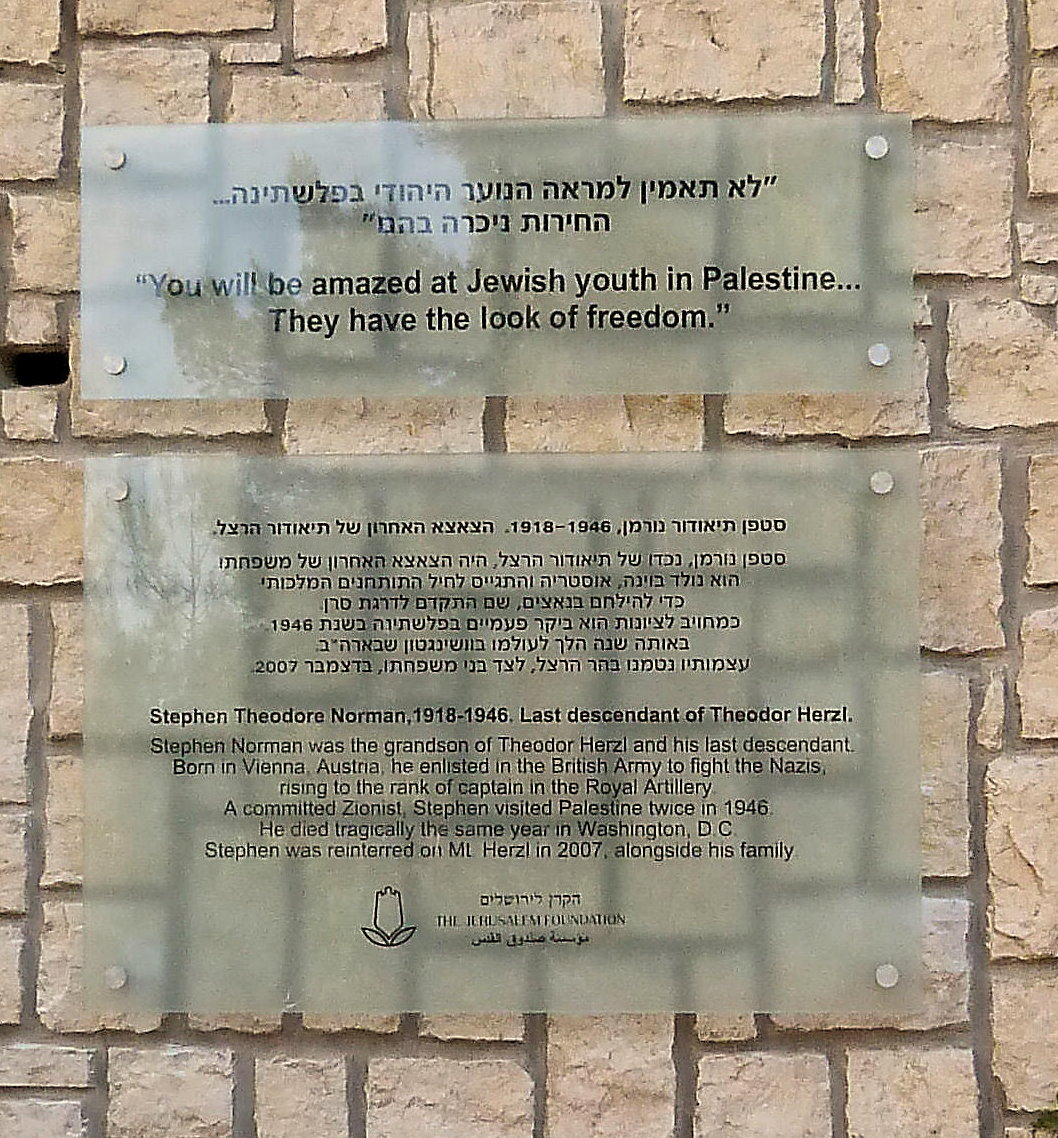
Stephen Norman garden marker at Mount Herzl in Jerusalem

In late August 1946, shortly after arriving in Washington, he learned that his family had been exterminated in the Holocaust. Norman had reestablished contact with his old nanny in Vienna who informed him of what happened. Norman became deeply depressed over the fate of his family and his inability to help the Jewish people "languishing" in the European camps. He subsequently committed suicide by jumping to his death from the Massachusetts Avenue Bridge in Washington, D.C., November 26, 1946. Norman was buried by the Jewish Agency in Washington, D.C., in an unmarked grave in the Adas Israel synagogue, toward the rear of the cemetery, along a fence as was traditional for suicides. A congregant had given his personal gravesite for Norman. His tombstone was donated, a few years later, from funds raised by Adas Israel Congregation by members who were ashamed the Jewish Agency did not even provide him a tombstone. It read simply, 'Stephen Theodore Norman, Captain Royal Artillery British Army, Grandson of Theodor Herzl, April 21, 1918 − November 26, 1946'.

== Reburial in Israel ==
He was re-interred on Mount Herzl, along with the rest of his family, in the section for Zionist leaders on December 5, 2007. Jerry Klinger, President of the Jewish American Society for Historic Preservation, was the principal organizer behind the seven-year reburial effort. Klinger noted, "it was an unexpected struggle against Zionist sclerosis."

== Commemoration ==
In Jerusalem, on Mt. Herzl, the Stephen Norman garden was completed in Norman's honor and memory. It is the only memorial in the world to a Herzl, other than to Theodor Herzl. The garden was dedicated May 2, 2012, by the Jerusalem Foundation, the World Zionist Organization and the Jewish American Society for Historic Preservation. On one of the walls of the garden, located between the Herzl Museum and the Herzl Educational Center, is a quote from Norman from when he visited Palestine in 1946, which summarises the meaning of Zionism and Israel: "You will be amazed at [the] Jewish Youth in Palestine... They have the look of freedom."
