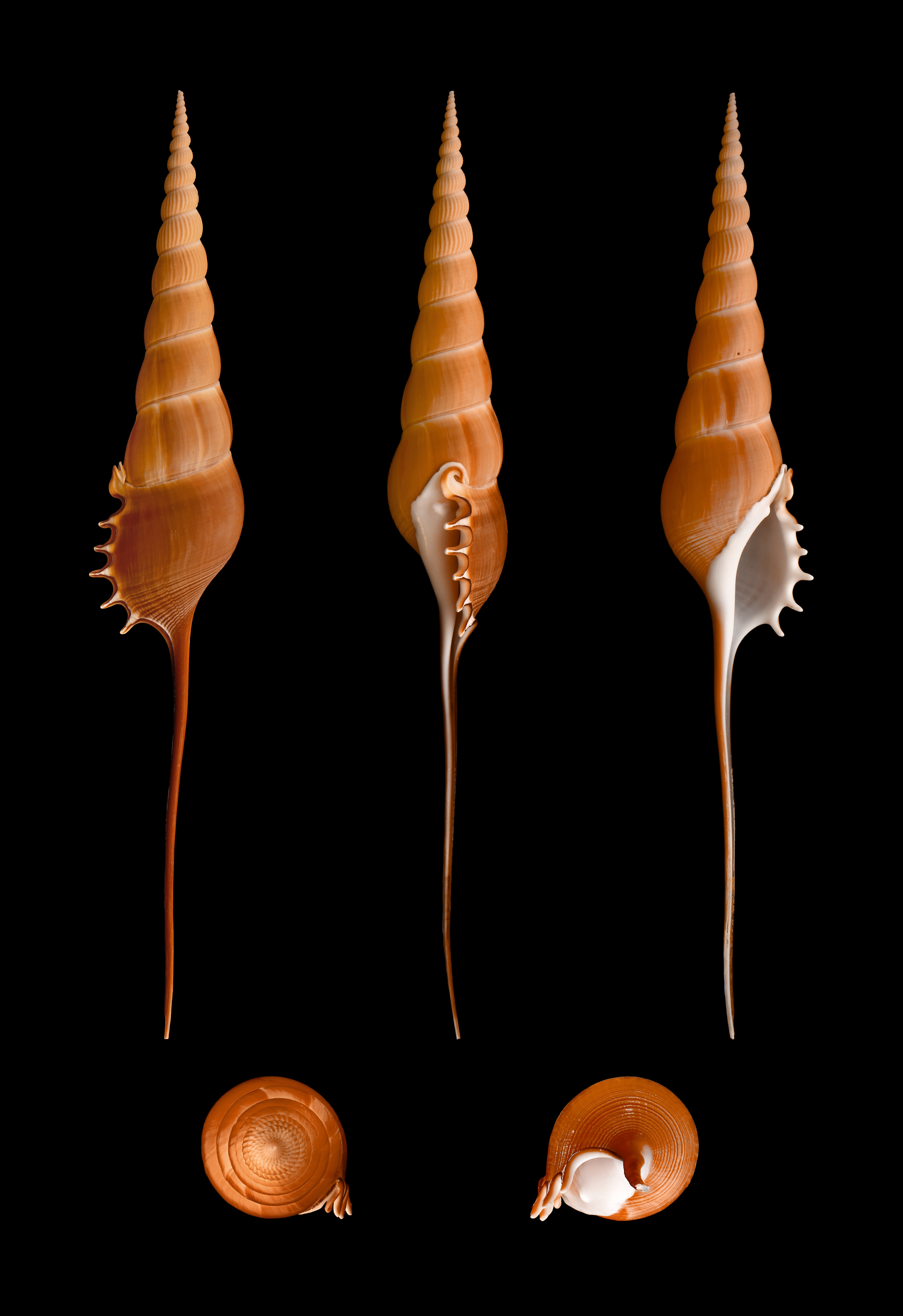
- Views of a shell of Tibia fusus

Scientific classification
- Domain: Eukaryota
- Kingdom: Animalia
- Phylum: Mollusca
- Class: Gastropoda
- Subclass: Caenogastropoda
- Order: Littorinimorpha
- Family: Rostellariidae
- Genus: Tibia; Röding, 1798

Type species
- Murex fusus Linnaeus, 1758

Species
- See text

Synonyms
- List: Gladius Mörch, 1852; Gladius (Rostellaria) Lamarck, 1799; Hippochrenes (Rostellaria) Lamarck, 1799; Rostellaria Lamarck, 1799; Rostellaria (Rostellaria) Lamarck, 1799; Rostellum Montfort, 1810

= Tibia (gastropod) =

Genus of molluscs

Tibia is a genus of large sea snails, marine gastropod mollusks.

This genus was traditionally considered to be part of the family Strombidae, the true conchs and their allies. However, recent morphological as well as molecular studies indicate that these ("shinbone shells") should be recognised as a separate family, the Rostellariidae, and this is the way they are treated in the database WoRMS.

== Species ==
The following species are recognised in the genus Tibia:

- Tibia bidigitata (Newton, 1922)
- †Tibia butaciana (K. Martin, 1899)
- Tibia curta (G. B. Sowerby II, 1842) - Tuticorin, southern India
- †Tibia dentata (Grateloup, 1827)
- Tibia fusus (Linnaeus, 1758) - Philippines
- †Tibia indica Dey, 1962
- Tibia insulaechorab Röding, 1798 - Red Sea
- †Tibia katoi Noda & R. Watanabe, 1996
- Tibia melanocheilus (A. Adams, 1855) - Turtle Island, Philippines; Brunei
- †Tibia verbeeki (K. Martin, 1899)

=== Former species ===
- Tibia delicatula Nevill, 1881 synonymized with Rostellariella delicatula (G. Nevill, 1881)
- Tibia deliculata synonymized with Rostellariella delicatula (G. Nevill, 1881)
- Tibia indiarum Röding, 1798 synonymized with Tibia fusus (Linnaeus, 1758)
- Tibia laurenti Duchamps, 1992 synonymized with Rimellopsis powisii (Petit de la Saussaye, 1840)
- Tibia luteostoma Angas, 1878 synonymized with Tibia insulaechorab Röding, 1798
- Tibia martinii Marrat, 1877 synonymized with Rostellariella martinii (Marrat, 1877)
- Tibia powisii (Petit de la Saussaye, 1840) synonymized with Rimellopsis powisii (Petit de la Saussaye, 1840)
- Tibia serrata (Perry, 1811) synonymized with Tibia curta (G. B. Sowerby II, 1842)

== Gallery ==
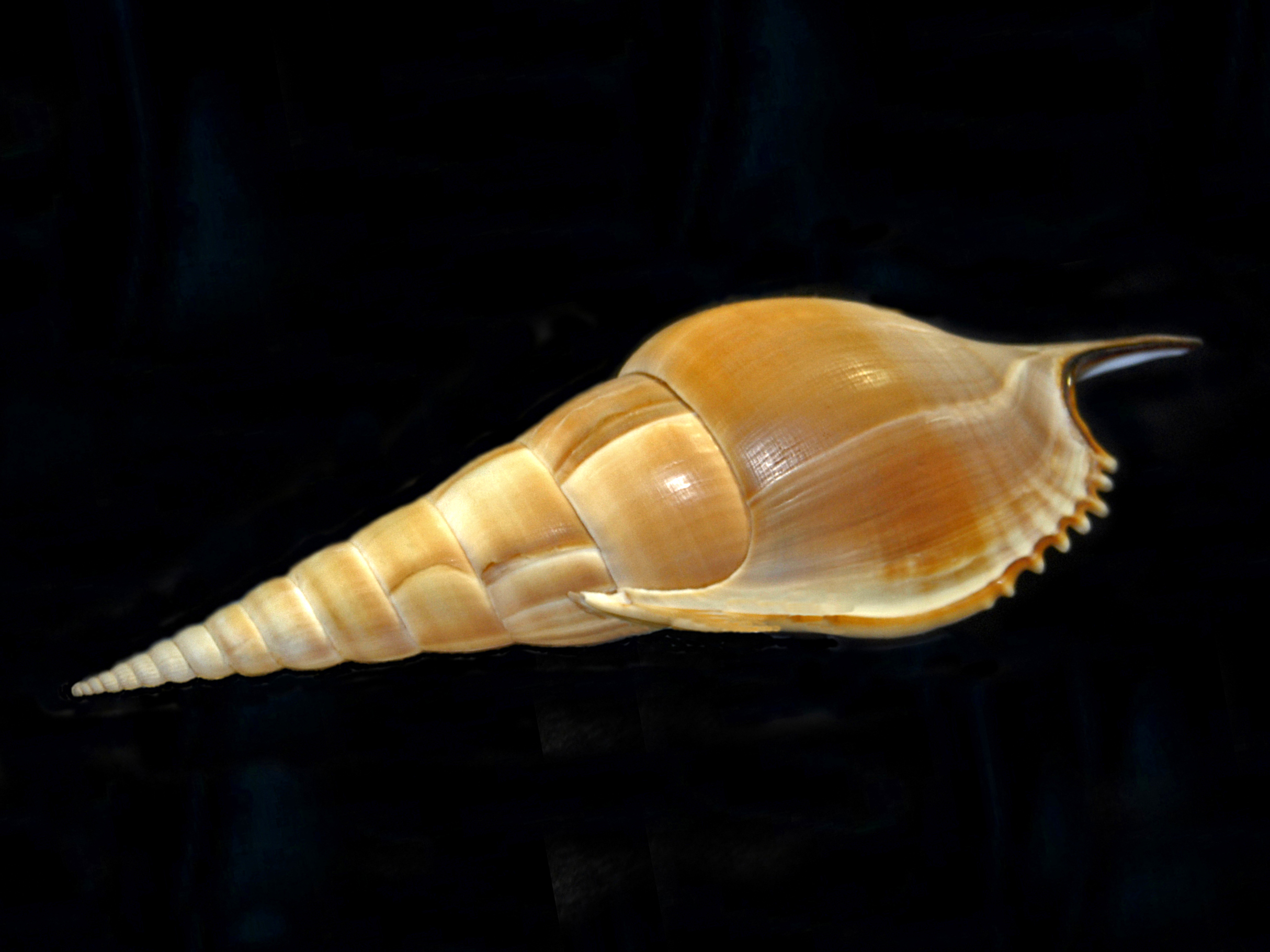
Tibia insulaechorab

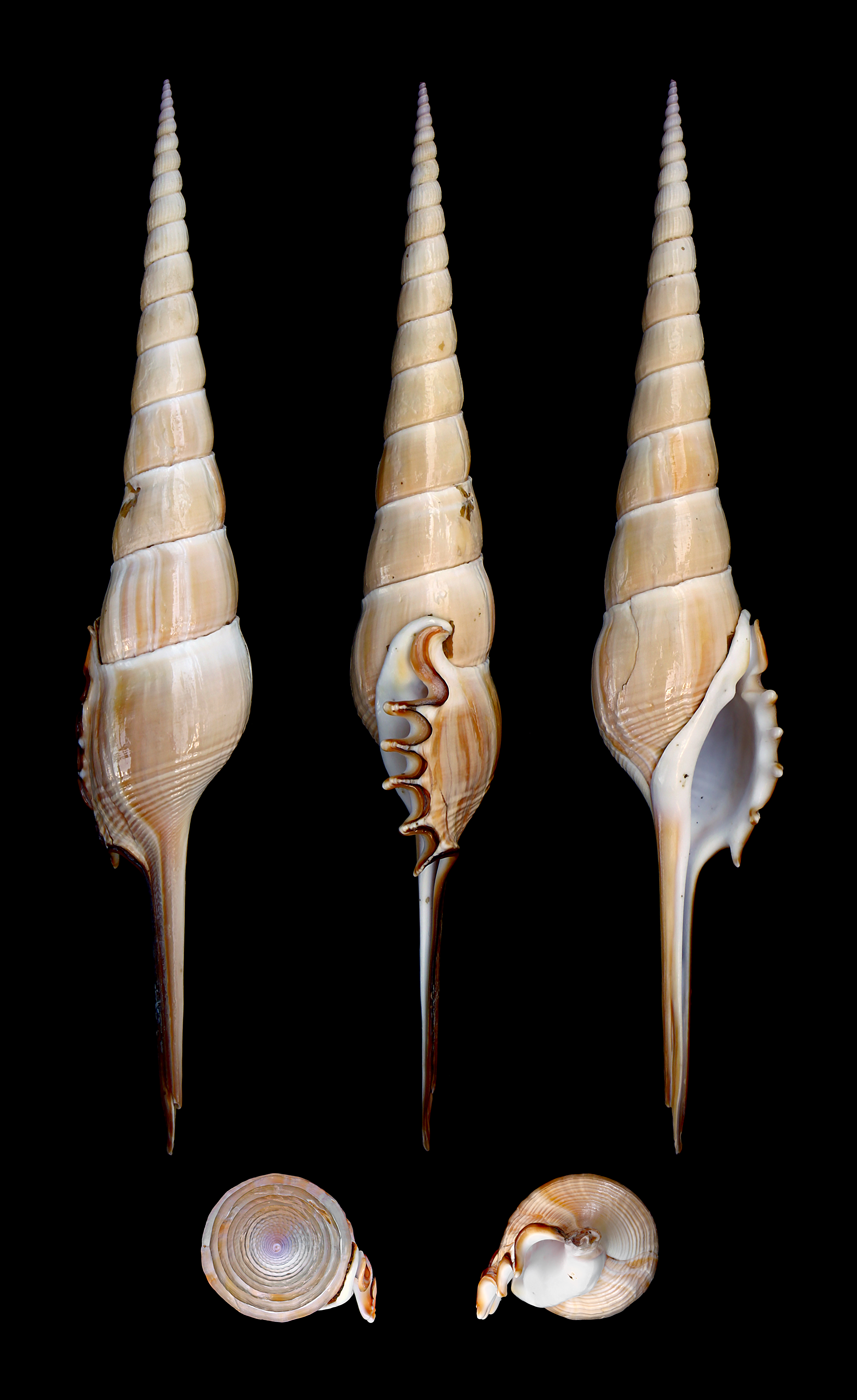
Tibia fusus

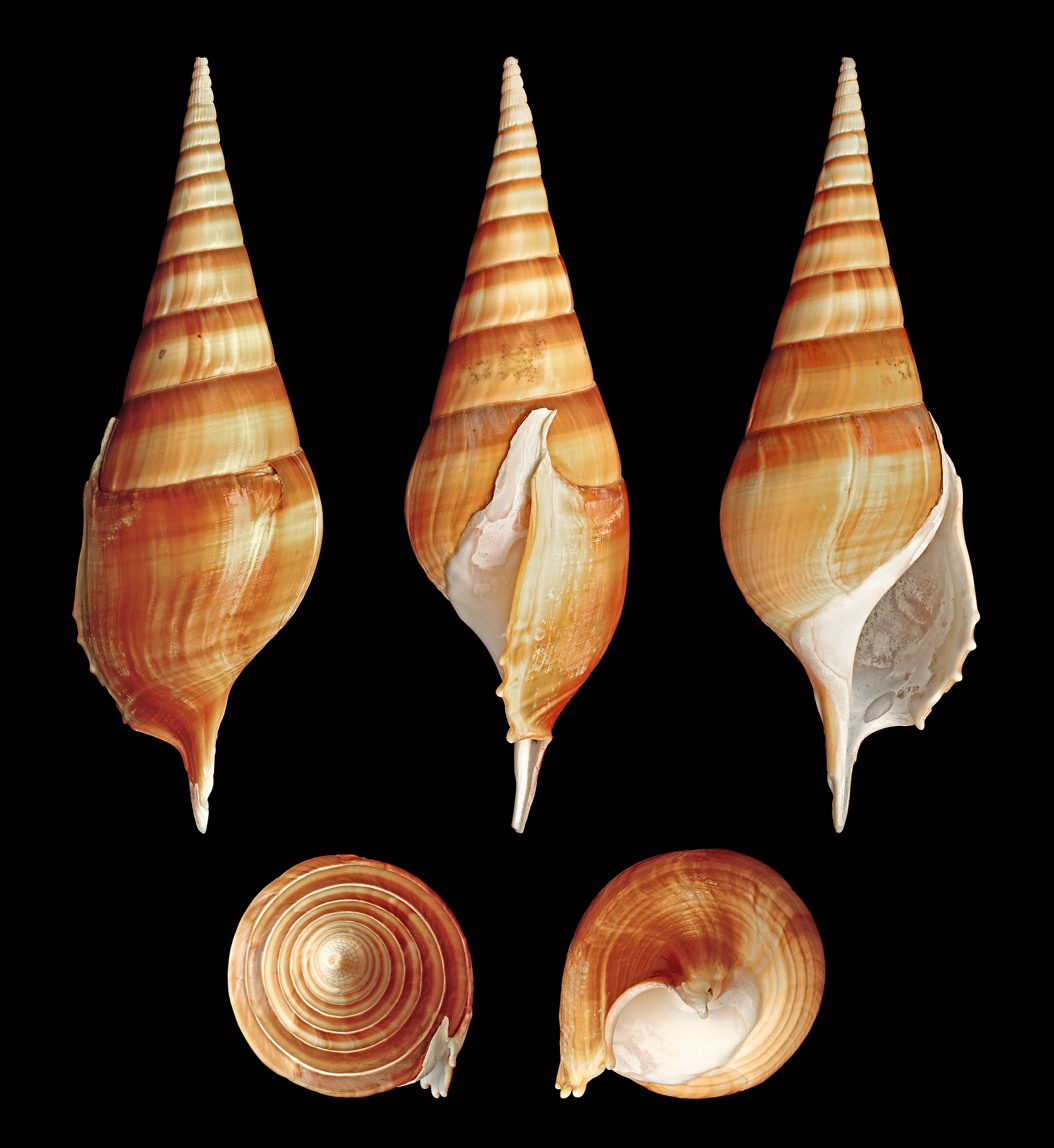
Tibia curta

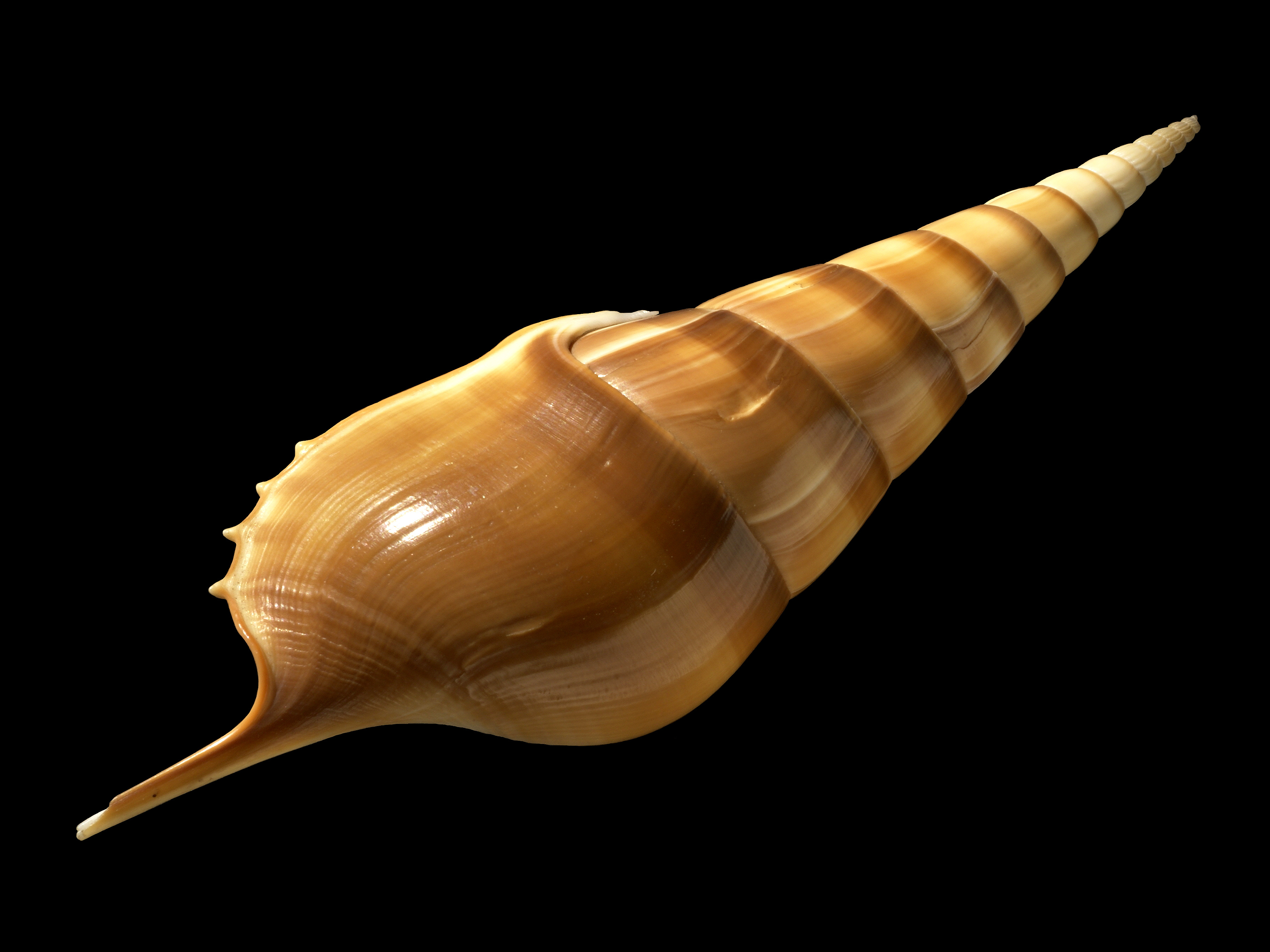
Tibia curta
