= List of memorials and monuments at Mount Herzl =

A list of the monuments and the memorials at the Mount Herzl national cemetery and the Yad Vashem Holocaust memorial in Jerusalem.

The Garden of the Missing in Action is a memorial garden with memorial board and memory stones. It is planned that the National Memorial Hall will be built at the entrance to the cemetery.

Image	Memorial	Description	Artist	Date
	National Memorial Hall For Israel's Fallen	National memorial for all soldiers who gave their lives establishing and defending the State of Israel	Kimmel Eshkolot Architects	2017
	Beta Israel Memorial	A stone structure in the shape of an Ethiopian village	Gabriel Curtis	2007
	Defenders of the Old City of Jerusalem 1948 War Memorial	A structure in the shape of an alley with the names of the fallen	Asher Hirem	1957
	Garden of the Missing in Action	Empty graves with a memorial board of the names	Moshe Oren	2004
	INS Dakar Memorial	A structure in the shape of a submarine	David Anatol Brotzkos	1970
	Memorial for the Jewish Soldiers in the Polish army in World War 2	A memorial board with the names of the fallen		1988
	Memorial for the Jewish Soldiers in the Soviet army in World War 2	A memorial board with the names of the fallen	Yizhak Rachelin	1989
	Yeshuv Volunteers in World War 2	A memorial board with the names of the fallen	Asher Hirem	1973
	Memorial for the Last of Kin	A structure in the shape of a reversed house with a memorial board of the names of the fallen	Micha Ullman	2004
	Operation Boatswain Memorial	A stone in the shape of a boat in a pool with the names of the fallen	Asher Hirem	1951
	SS Erinpura Memorial	A structure in the shape of a ship in a pool with the names of the fallen	Asher Hirem	1985
	Victims of Acts of Terror Memorial	A memorial board with the names of the victims	Moshe Oren	1998
	Monument for the Egoz immigration ship	A memorial board with the names of the fallen		1992
	Monument for the Salvador immigration ship	A memorial board with the names of the fallen		1964

== Monuments and Memorials in Yad Vashem ==
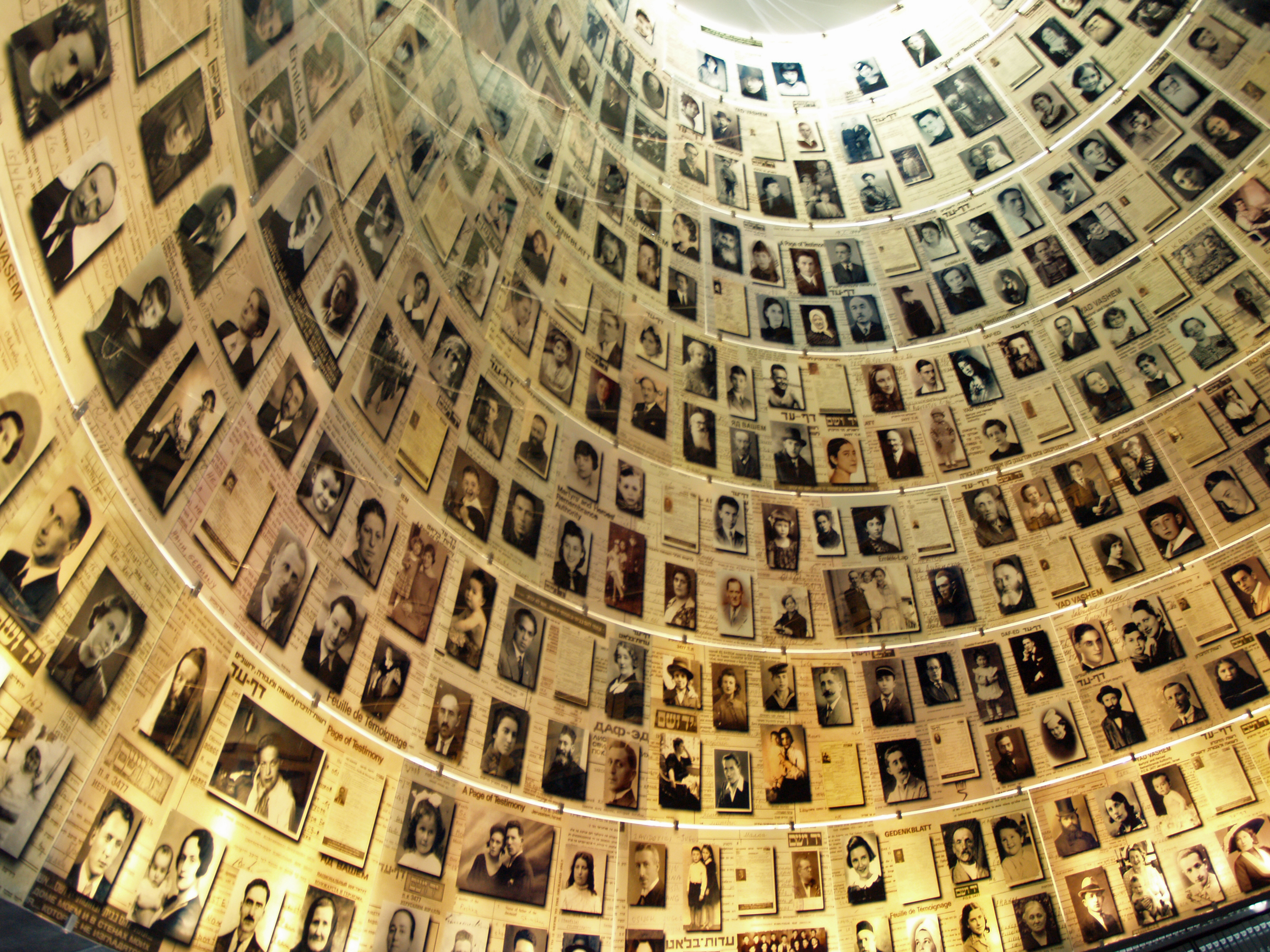
Hall of Names

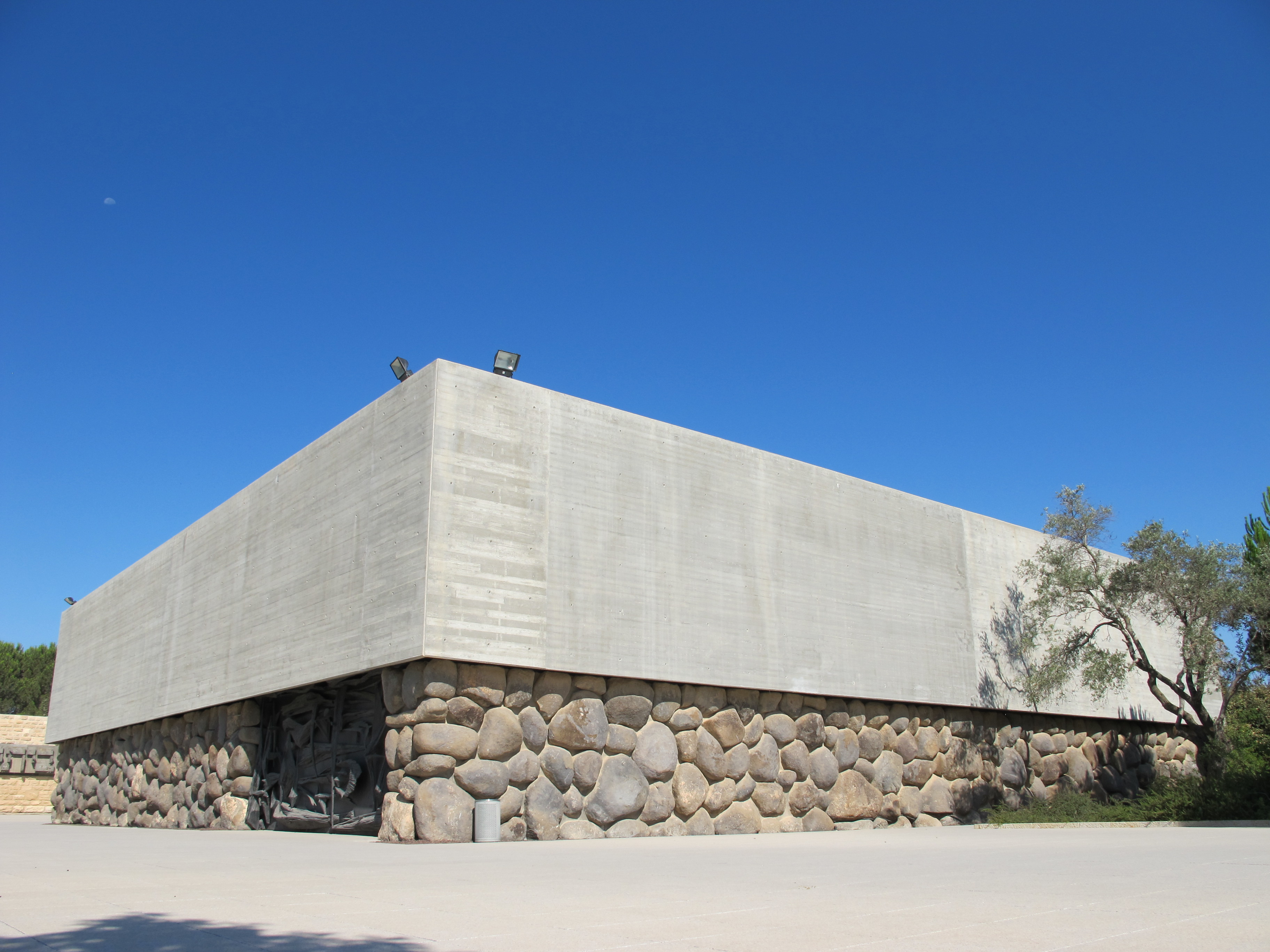
The Eternal Flame Hall

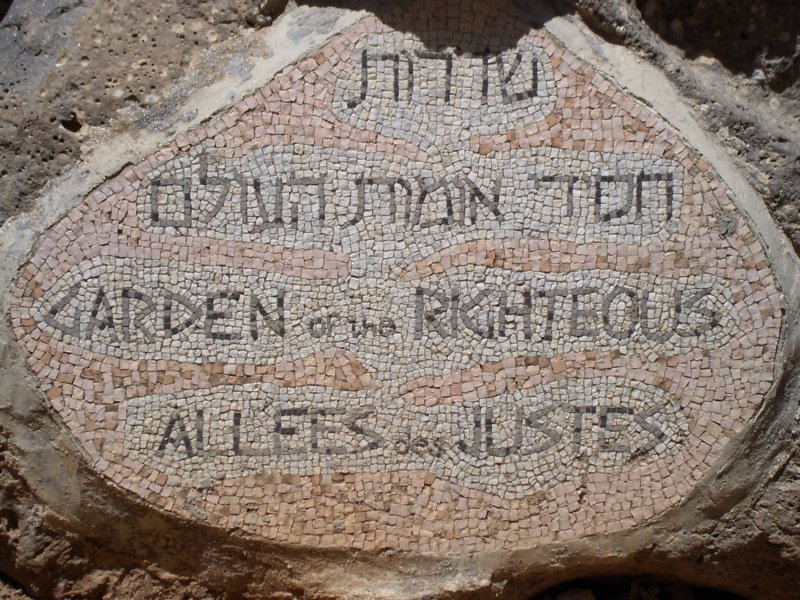
Garden of the Righteous Among the Nations

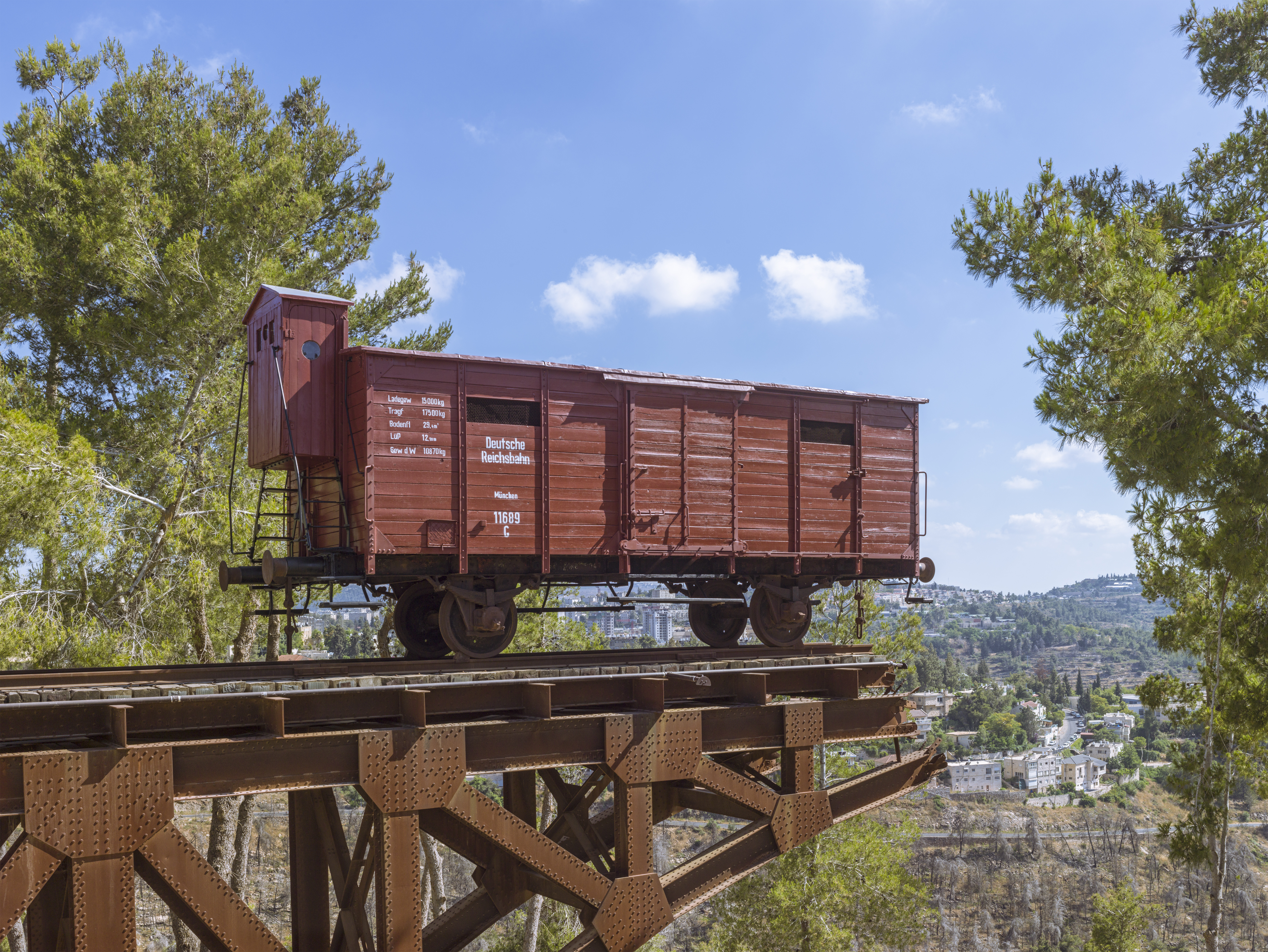
Cattle car memorial

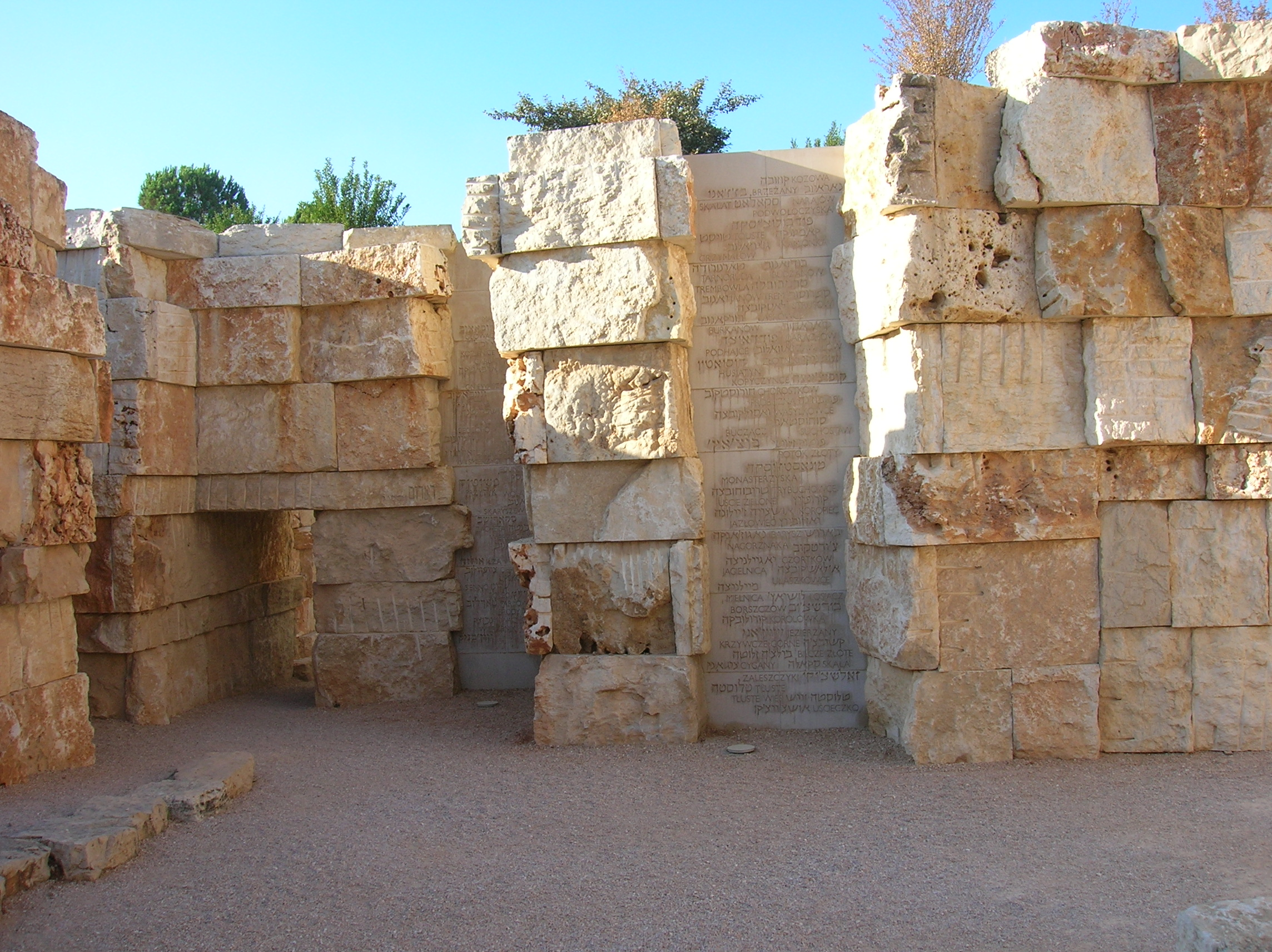
Valley of the Destroyed Communities

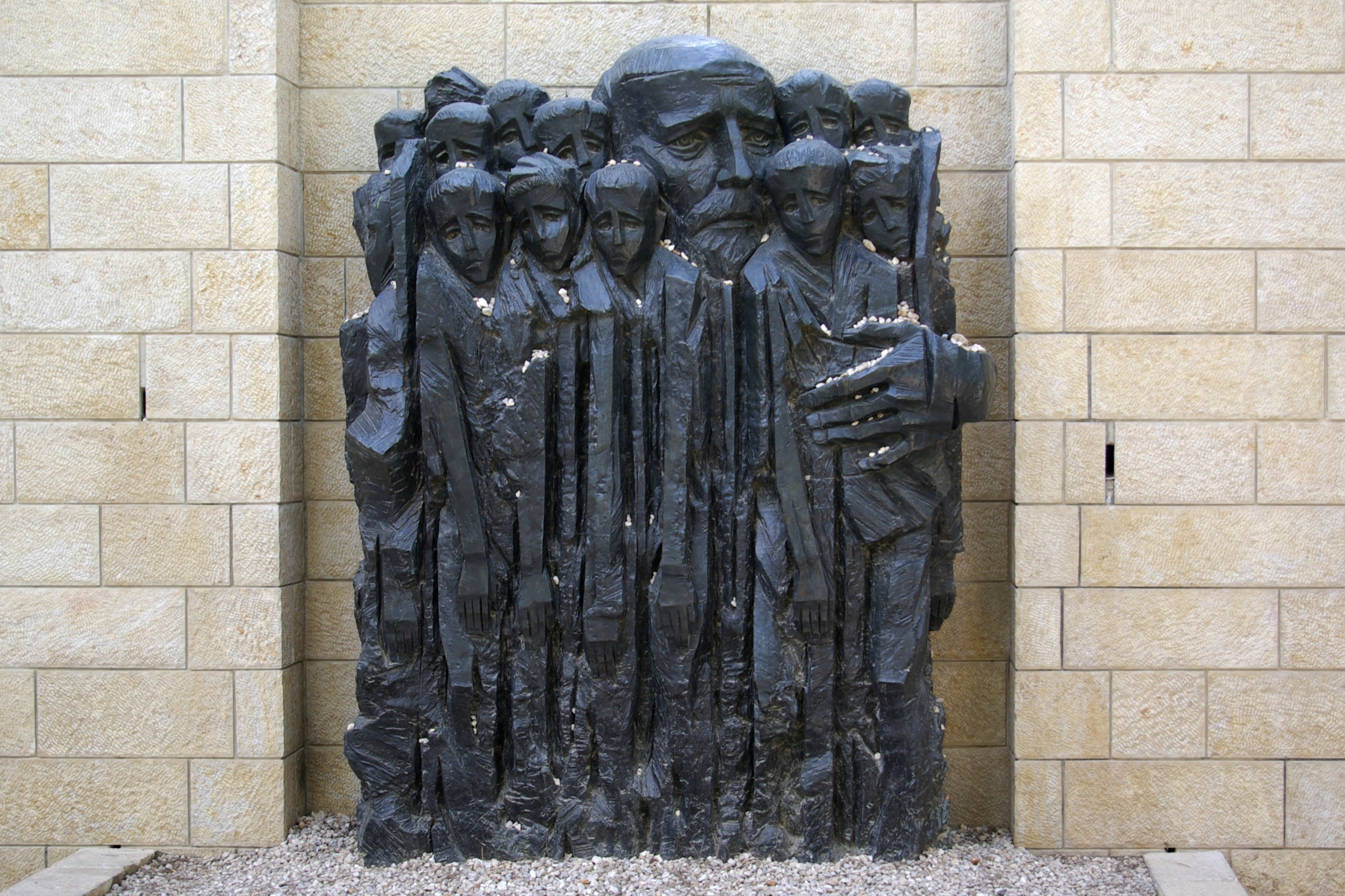
Janusz Korczak and the children, memorial

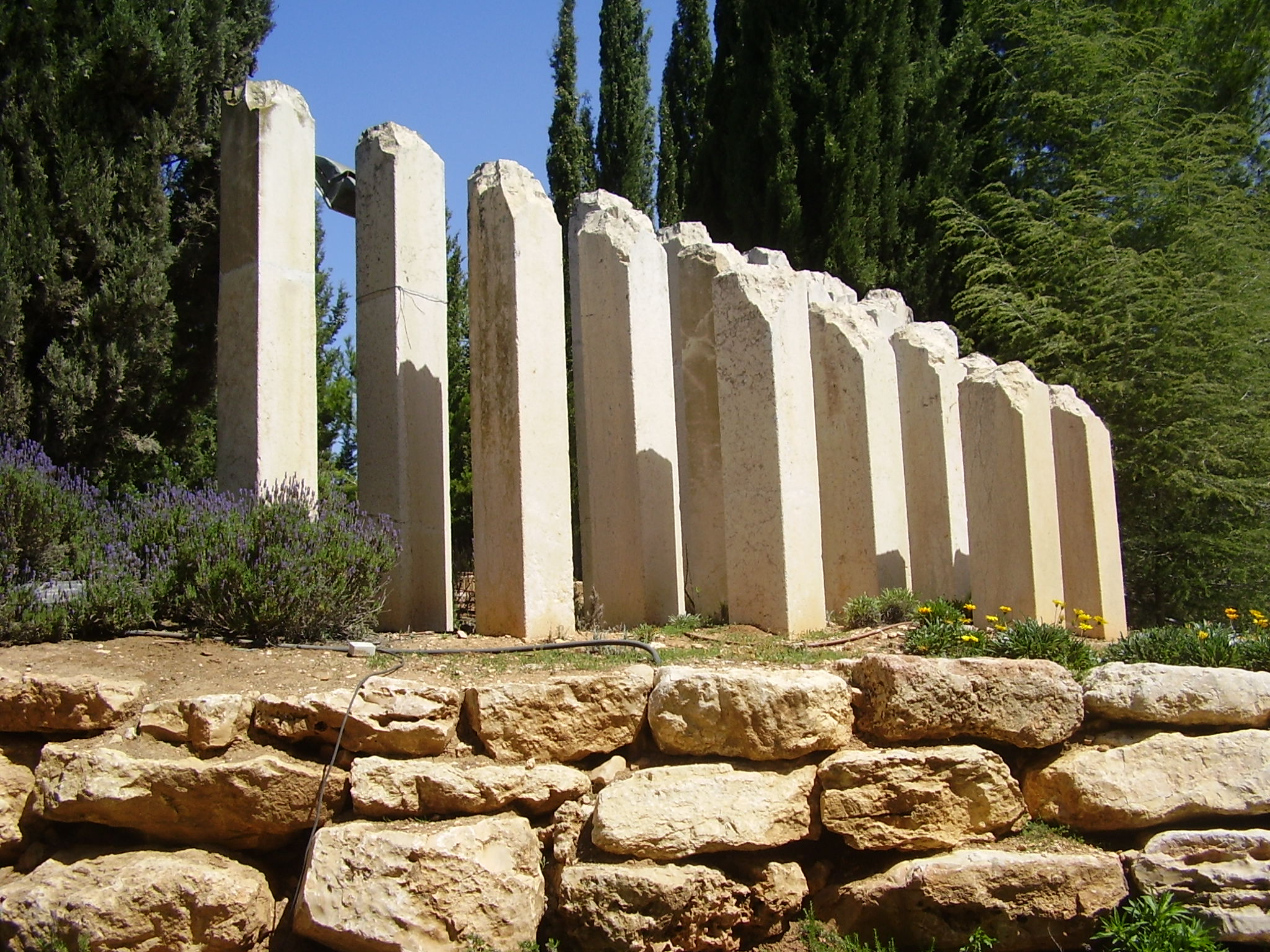
Memorial to the Jewish children murdered by the Nazis

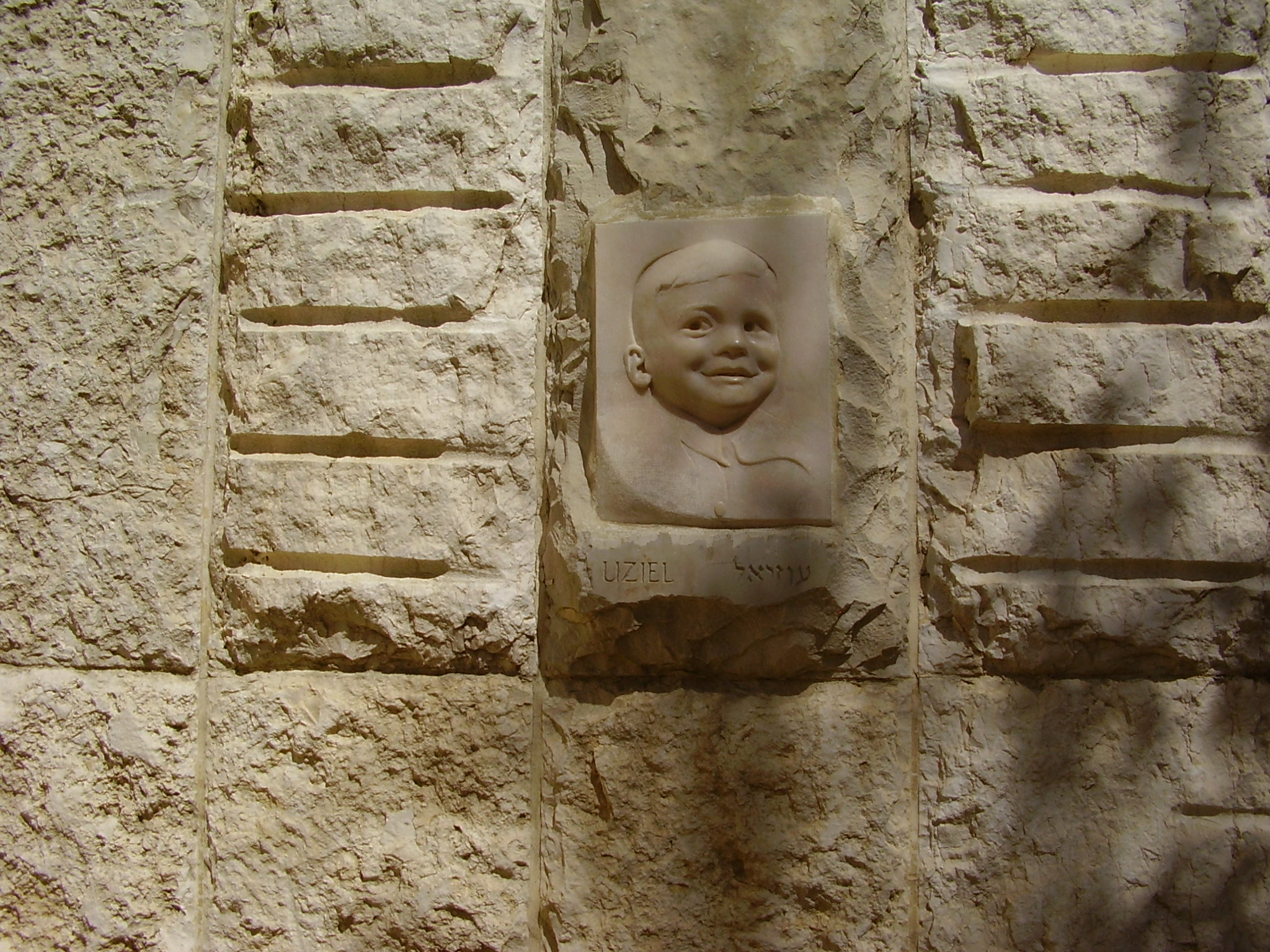
Children's Memorial Hall
