= Rostellariella lorenzi =

Scientific classification
- Kingdom: Animalia
- Phylum: Mollusca
- Class: Gastropoda
- Subclass: Caenogastropoda
- Order: Littorinimorpha
- Family: Rostellariidae
- Genus: Rostellariella
- Species: R. lorenzi

Binomial name
- Rostellariella lorenzi Morrison, 2005

Species of gastropod

Rostellariella lorenzi is a species of sea snail, a marine gastropod mollusk in the family Strombidae. It is found in the Arafura and Ceram Seas in Indonesia. The size of an adult shell varies between 85mm and 100mm.
