= Rostellariella barbieri =

Scientific classification
- Kingdom: Animalia
- Phylum: Mollusca
- Class: Gastropoda
- Subclass: Caenogastropoda
- Order: Littorinimorpha
- Family: Rostellariidae
- Genus: Rostellariella
- Species: R. barbieri

Binomial name
- Rostellariella barbieri Morrison, 2008

Species of gastropod

Rostellariella barbieri is a species of sea snail, a marine gastropod mollusk in the family Strombidae, the true conchs.
