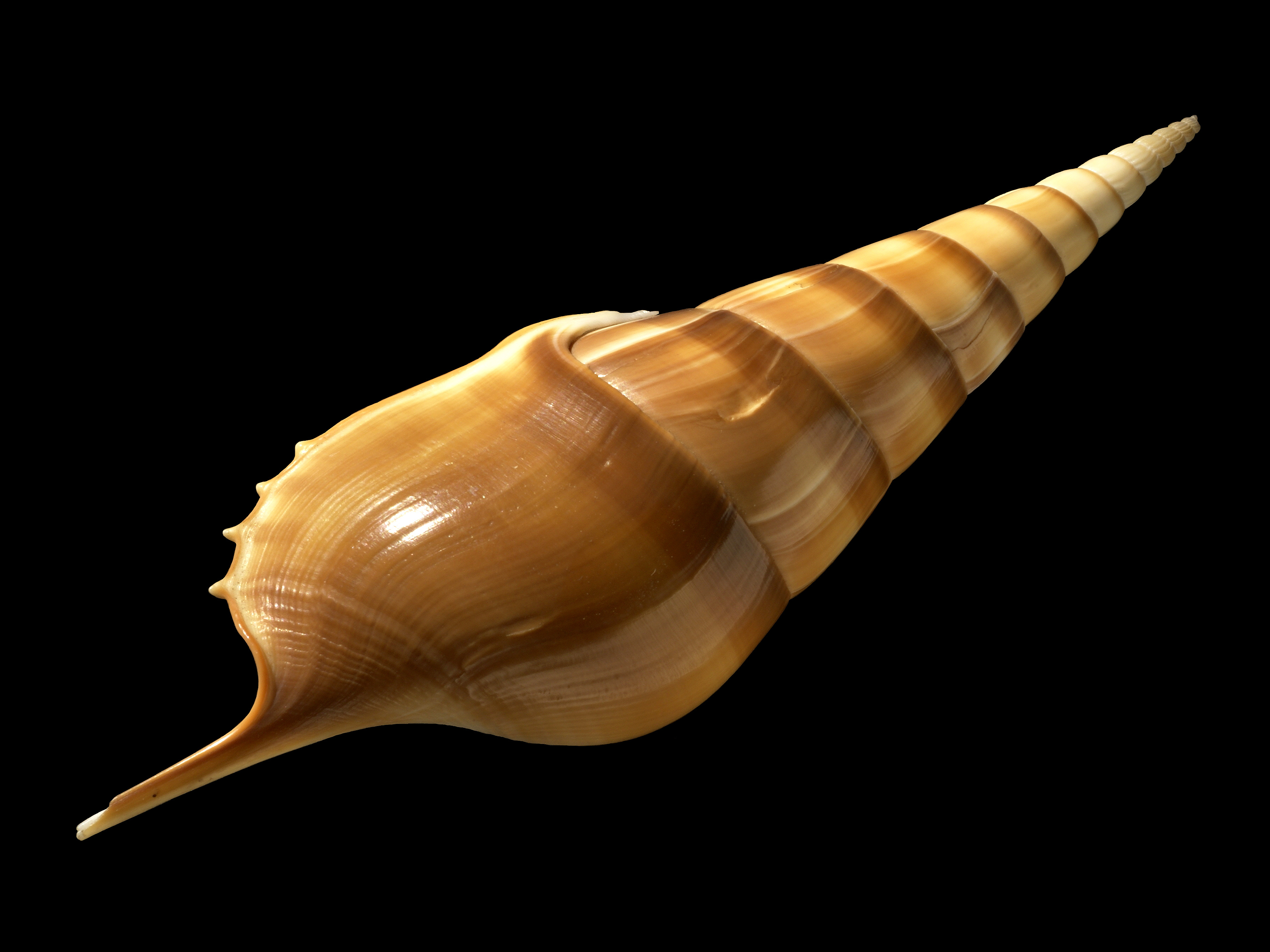
- A dorsal view of a shell of Tibia curta.

Scientific classification
- Kingdom: Animalia
- Phylum: Mollusca
- Class: Gastropoda
- Subclass: Caenogastropoda
- Order: Littorinimorpha
- Family: Rostellariidae
- Genus: Tibia
- Species: T. curta

Binomial name
- Tibia curta (G. B. Sowerby II, 1842)

Synonyms
- Rostellaria curta G. B. Sowerby II, 1842 (original combination)

= Tibia curta =

Species of gastropod

Tibia curta, common name the Indian tibia, is a species of large sea snail, a marine gastropod mollusk in the family Strombidae, the true conchs. This species occurs in southern India.

== Description ==
Common Size 150 mm, but the size of the shell varies between 120 mm and 185 mm.

== Distribution ==
This marine species occurs from the Persian Gulf to the Bay of Bengal
