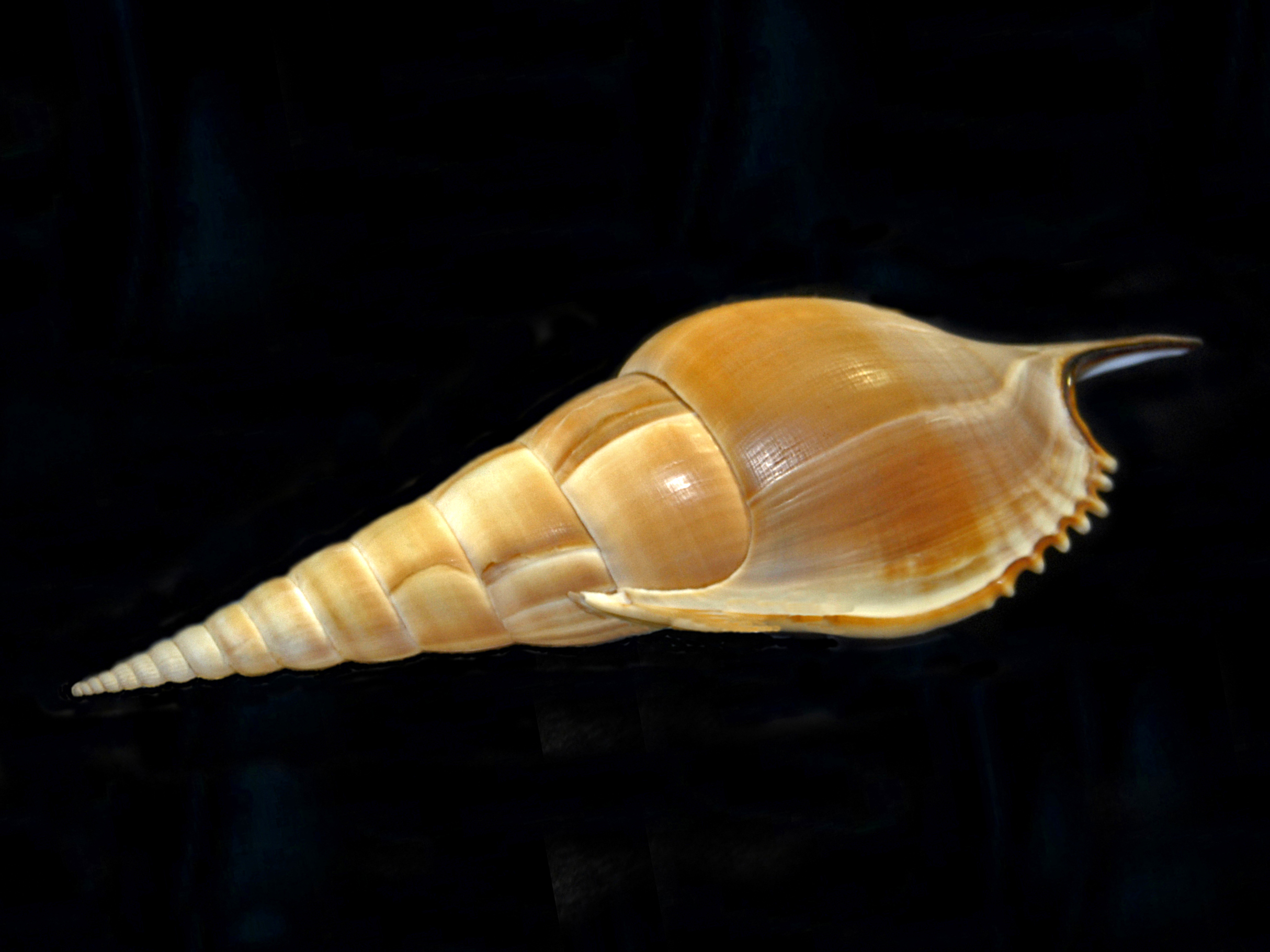
- T. insulaechorab shell, lateral view

Scientific classification
- Kingdom: Animalia
- Phylum: Mollusca
- Class: Gastropoda
- Subclass: Caenogastropoda
- Order: Littorinimorpha
- Family: Rostellariidae
- Genus: Tibia
- Species: T. insulaechorab

Binomial name
- Tibia insulaechorab Röding, 1798

Synonyms
- Rostellaria brevirostris Schumacher, 1817; Rostellaria curvirostra Lamarck, 1816; Rostellaria dentula Perry, 1811; Rostellaria magna Mörch, 1852; Rostellum ternatanum Montfort, 1810; Tibia luteostoma Angas, 1878

= Tibia insulaechorab =

Species of sea snail

Tibia insulaechorab, common name the Arabian tibia, is a species of sea snail, a marine gastropod mollusk in the family Rostellariidae. It is native to the Red Sea and the Horn of Africa.

== Taxonomy ==
This species was first described by the German malacologist Peter Friedrich Röding in 1798, the type locality being the Red Sea. He gave it the name Tibia insulaechorab; it was at first included in the family Strombidae, but this large family was later split and the genus Tibia was transferred to the family Rostellariidae. A 2005 study by Sabine, concluded that Tibia was probably closely related to Terebellum, there being several well known morphological similarities between them.

== Description ==
The shell can grow to a length of 200 mm (8 in), and the live snail can weigh about 450 g (16 oz). The shell is elongated ovate, with a short body whorl and a narrowly conical spire with ten or more whorls. The smaller whorls are finely sculptured with transverse ridges; the larger whorls are nearly smooth. The large ovate aperture is whitish, contracted at the top by a transverse fold of the left lip. The outer lip is emarginated at its upper edge, and has about six blunt teeth on its lower edge. The beak is straight in young shells but becomes curved with age. The colour is some shade of brown or reddish-brown with a white or golden aperture.

Because of their attractive appearance, these shells are highly sought after by shell collectors.

== Distribution ==
Tibia insulaechorab is native to the western Indian Ocean. Its range extends from Madagascar and the east coast of Africa to the Red Sea, the Gulf of Aqaba, western India, and the Maldives.

== Ecology ==
Members of this family are mostly herbivorous, browsing on delicate algae, or detritivores, swallowing sand in order to extract decomposing plant material.
