= Steinhardt Museum of Natural History =

Natural history museum in Tel Aviv, Israel

- מוזיאון הטבע ע״ש שטיינהרדט (Hebrew)

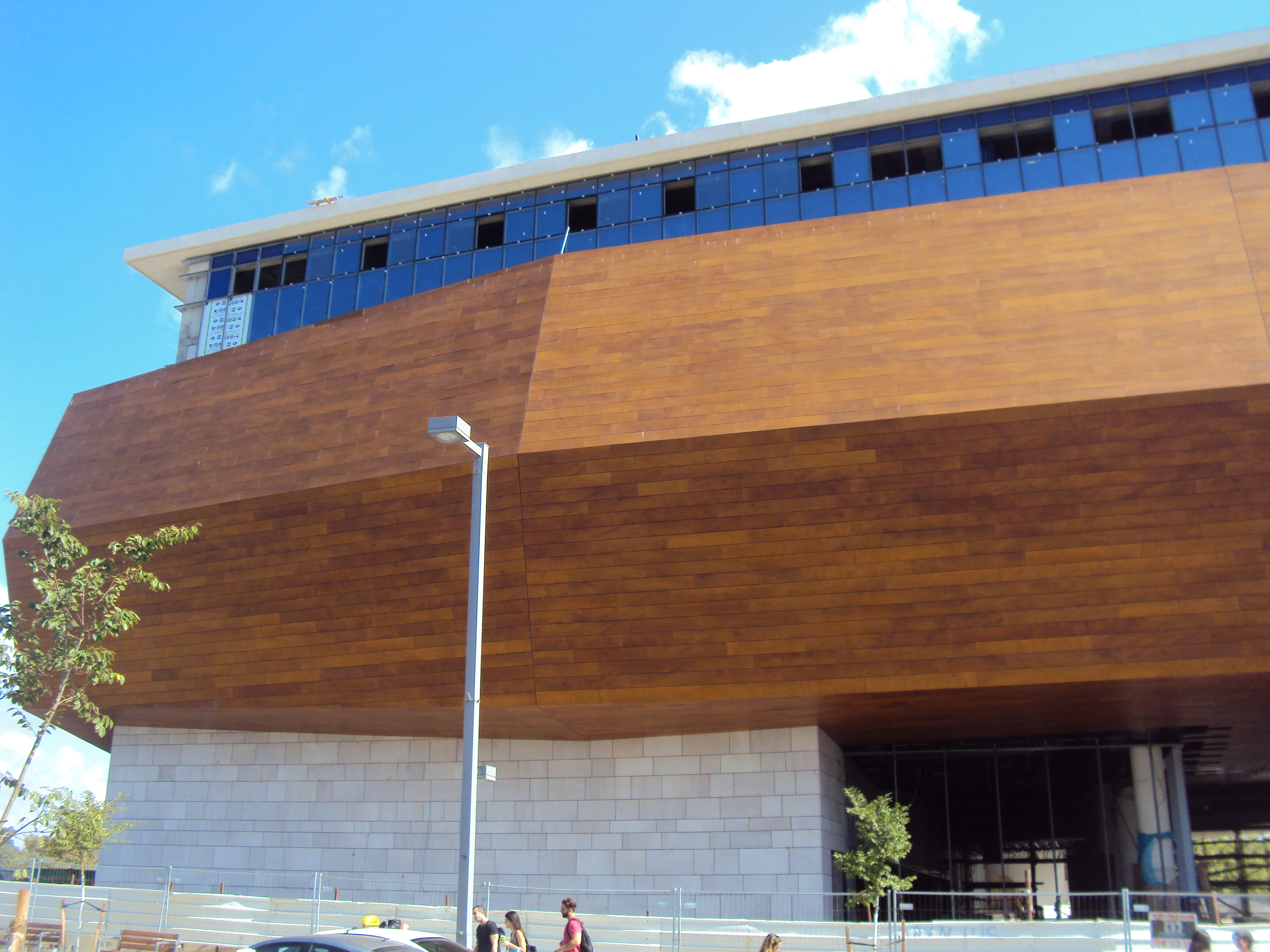
- The museum under construction in 2016.

- Location within Tel Aviv
- Established: 2018
- Location: Tel Aviv
- Coordinates: 32.113701°N 34.807448°E
- Type: Natural history museum
- Collection size: 5.5 million items
- Founder: Tel Aviv University
- Executive director: Alon Sapan
- Curator: Tamar Dayan
- Architect: Kimmel Eshkolot Architects
- Website: smnh.tau.ac.il/eng

The Steinhardt Museum of Natural History (Hebrew: מוזיאון הטבע ע״ש שטיינהרדט), Israel National Center for Biodiversity Studies at Tel Aviv University, is a natural history museum in Israel, including both education and a research center. It is the largest and most active center in Israel of documentation and science, focusing on biodiversity research and its varied applications including nature conservation, environmental protection, and agriculture.

The museum is set for the discovery, collections development and care, and scientific categorization of millions of specimens, documenting the flora and fauna in Israel and the Middle East for thousands of years, as well as the history of humankind and its interactions with the environment. It provides access to the public and the scientific and professional community.

Collections holding some 5.5 million items, accumulated by scientists from Tel Aviv University and other institutions, were moved to the new museum before it opened to the public in July 2018.

== Architecture and concept ==
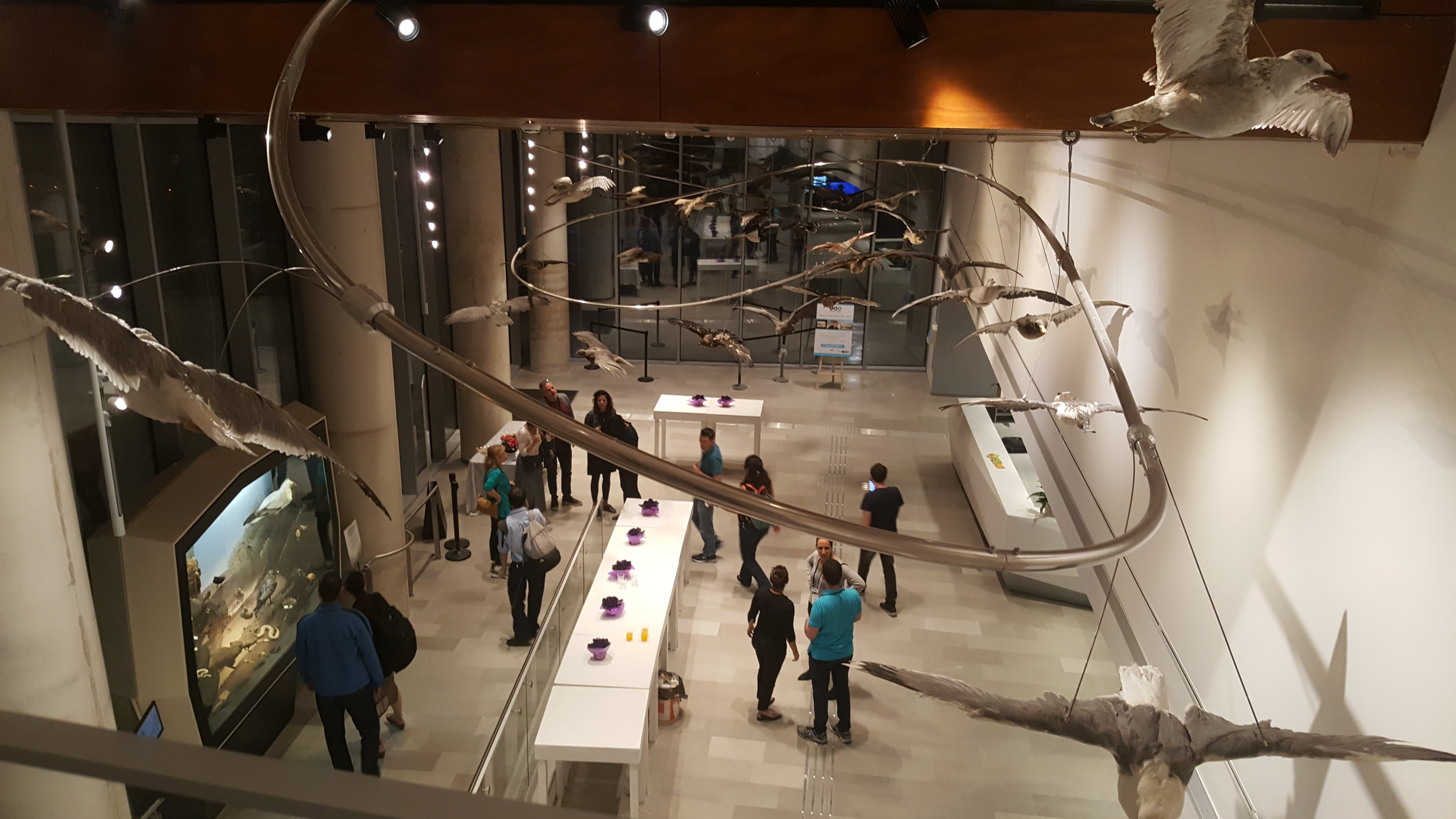
Museum interior

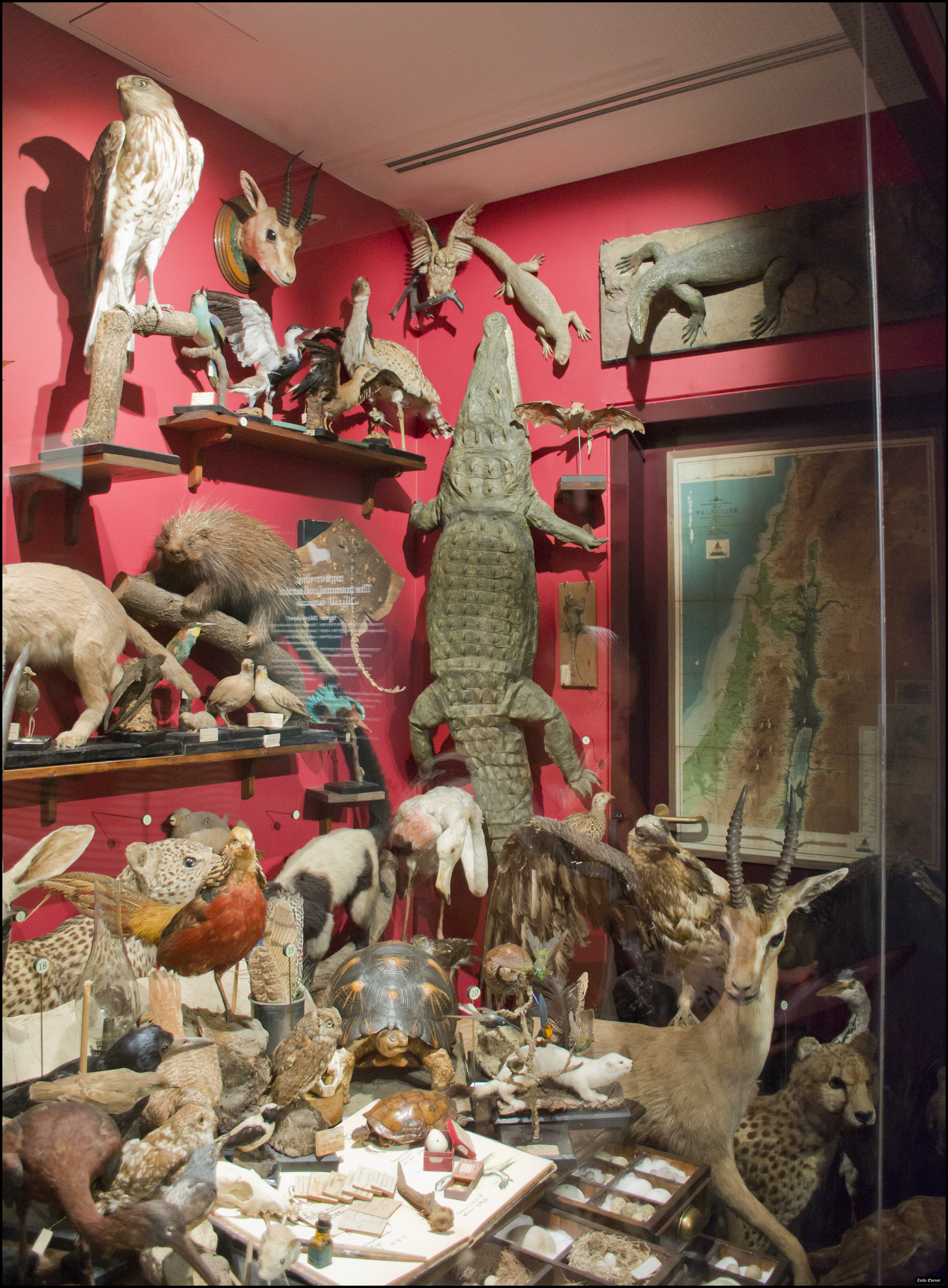
The collection of Father Schmitz, a zoologist of the late 19th and early 20th century

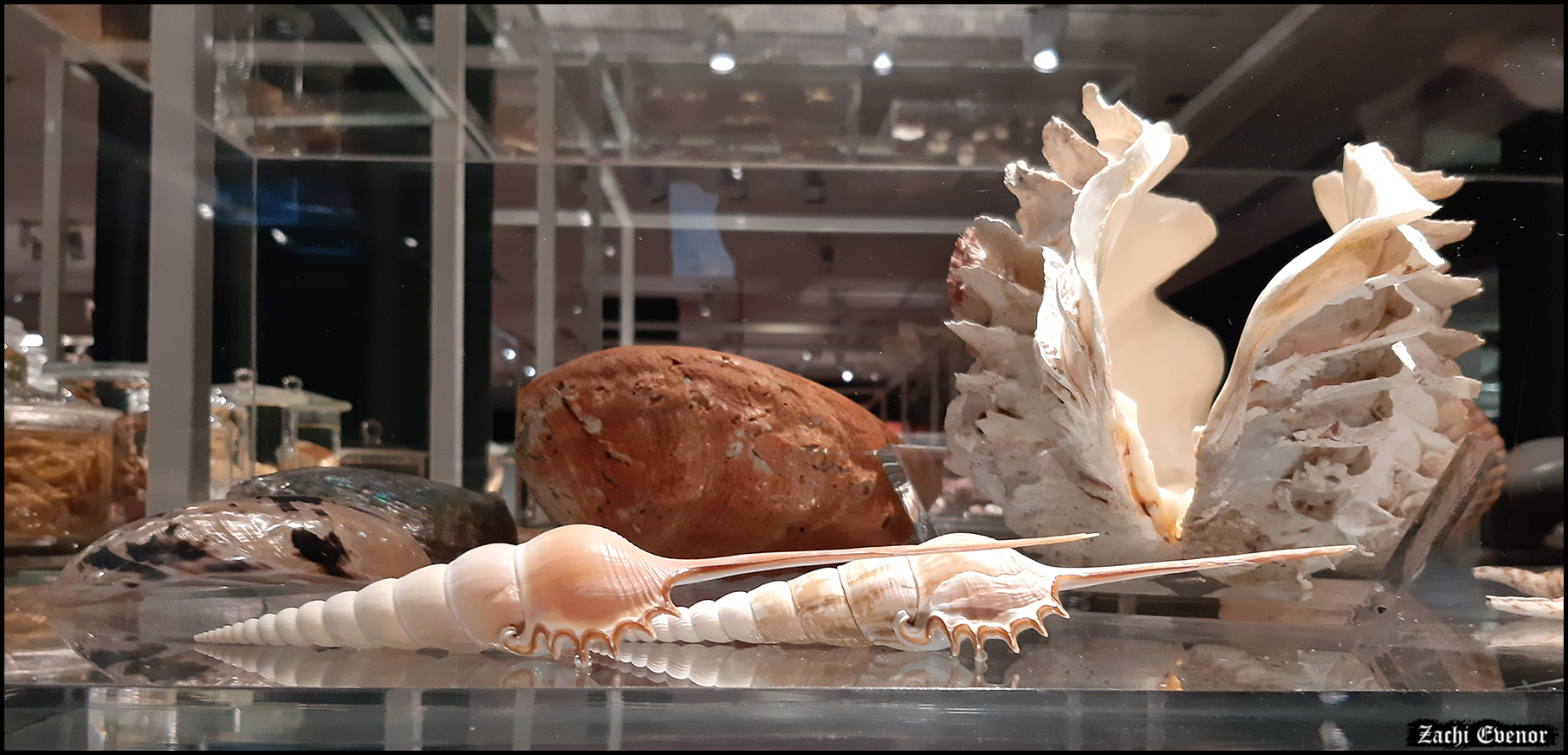
Shells of Tibia fusus in the "Collection Treasuries" exhibition

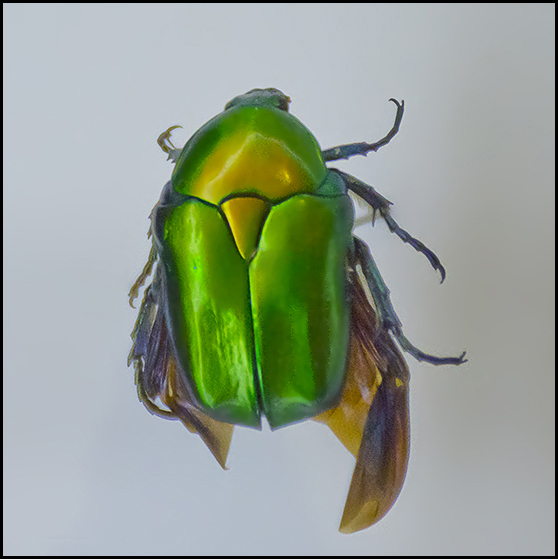
Beetle Protaetia cuprea ignicollis in the Insects display

The museum was designed by Kimmel Eshkolot Architects. The 9,620 sq m five-story building was designed as a "Treasure Box" or "Noah's Ark".

Thousands of items from the collections, used primarily for basic and applied research, for teaching and training, are presented to the public as part of exhibitions. Exhibition spaces comprise over 1,700 square meters in nine themed exhibitions: bird migration; Israel's diversity of ecosystems; bugs and beyond; life in the dark; (animal) shape, structure and functions; human impact on the environment; interaction between animals; treasures of the collections.

== Permanent exhibitions ==
- The Great Bird Migration - on the ceiling of the entrance lobby there are taxidermies of flying birds passing over Israel during the migration season, including water birds, storks, pelicans and rollers.
- Bugs and Beyond - in the entrance floor and including terrariums with living arthropods as well as taxidermy specimens.
- Life in the Dark - animals that live without daylight
- Urban Nature - wild animals living in the city
- Israel's Landscapes - several flat dioramas of natural habitats in Israel and their common fauna, including desert, sand & dunes, forests, fresh waters and the Mount Hermon's alpine climate, with stuffed and mounted animals. Entrance ramp to1st floor.
- Form and Function - an exhibition showing how the body of animals is adapted to their function. Includes skeletons and taxidermies of animals such as Velociraptor (replica), giant Aldabra tortoise, Negev gazelle, porcupine, elephant skull, mallard, flying fox and more. 1st floor.
- The Human Impact - an interactive exhibition showing mainly the negative human impact on the environment (pollution, destruction of habitats, invasive species, over-fishing etc).
- "The Web of Life" - Interaction Between Animals and Ecosystems - starting with a diorama of the ecosystem created by the Acacia tree, showing inter-relations and connections between different animals, plants and their ecosystems.
- Whale - a full size skeleton of a Common minke whale
- Treasures of the Collections - a wide collection of taxidermied birds and mammals, skeletons and preserved specimen of fish and marine invertebrates. The historical collection of zoologist Father Ernst Schmitz (1845–1922), on lease from the German Association of the Holy Land, is presented behind a protective glass. It includes the last wild Nile crocodile hunted in 1912 in Ottoman Palestine. 2nd floor.
- What Makes Us Human? - the origin of man: anthropology and skeletons of prehistoric men, showing their evolution from "Lucy" (replica) to modern Homo sapiens. 4th floor.

== Research and education ==
The specimens record the fauna and flora of the region over the past century, as well as the development and history of humankind. The collections are an extremely active National Research Infrastructure that is used by over 500 scientists, graduate students, and professionals from Israel and the world every year.

The museum integrates and absorbs the educational activities previously conducted within "Campus-Teva" at Tel Aviv University.

=== Israel Taxonomy Initiative ===
The Israel Taxonomy Initiative (ITI), a project supported by the higher education system of Israel, government ministries and agencies, and various research institutions, functions within the museum. Its main activities aim to revive the field of taxonomy, to train of taxonomists, and to deepen the knowledge of the biodiversity of Israel. The ultimate goal of the initiative is to contribute to the study, conservation and sustainable use of ecosystems in Israel.

== Location ==
The museum building is located in the east of Tel Aviv University campus, across the Diaspora Museum gate, adjacent to the Botanical Gardens and the I. Meier Segals Garden for Zoological Research.

== Contributing research institutions ==
The Zoological Museum (School of Zoology, George S Wise Faculty of Life Sciences), the National Herbarium of algae, fungi, and lichen (Department of Molecular Biology and Ecology of Plants, Faculty of Life Sciences), National Anthropological Collections (Department of Anatomy, Faculty of Medicine), and the collections and laboratories of biological archaeology (Institute of Archeology, Faculty of Humanities) have joined forces to establish the museum.

The Israel Academy of Sciences and Humanities recognized the collections as national collections, a national museum of natural history in the making, while the National Council for Research & Development recognizes them as a National Research Infrastructure. The Ministry of Science & Technology recognizes the museum as a Knowledge center in agricultural and the environment.

== Financing and administration ==
The construction of the museum building was made possible following the support of Michael Steinhardt, former Chairman of the Board of Governors of Tel Aviv University, and his wife, Judy, as well as donations from other foundations and individuals (Yad Hanadiv, Dan David Foundation, Arison Foundation, KKL-JNF, Millie Phillips, Colette Kerber, and Haim Filler, as well as government assistance provided by the Planning and Grants Committee of the Council for Higher Education, the Ministries of Environmental Protection; Agriculture and Rural Development; Tourism; Science & Technology).

The museum is chaired by Prof. Tamar Dayan of the School of Zoology at Tel Aviv University, with Alon Sapan acting as director. The collections operate under the auspices of the Israel Academy of Sciences and Humanities and with the support of the Planning and Grants Committee of the Council for Higher Education.
