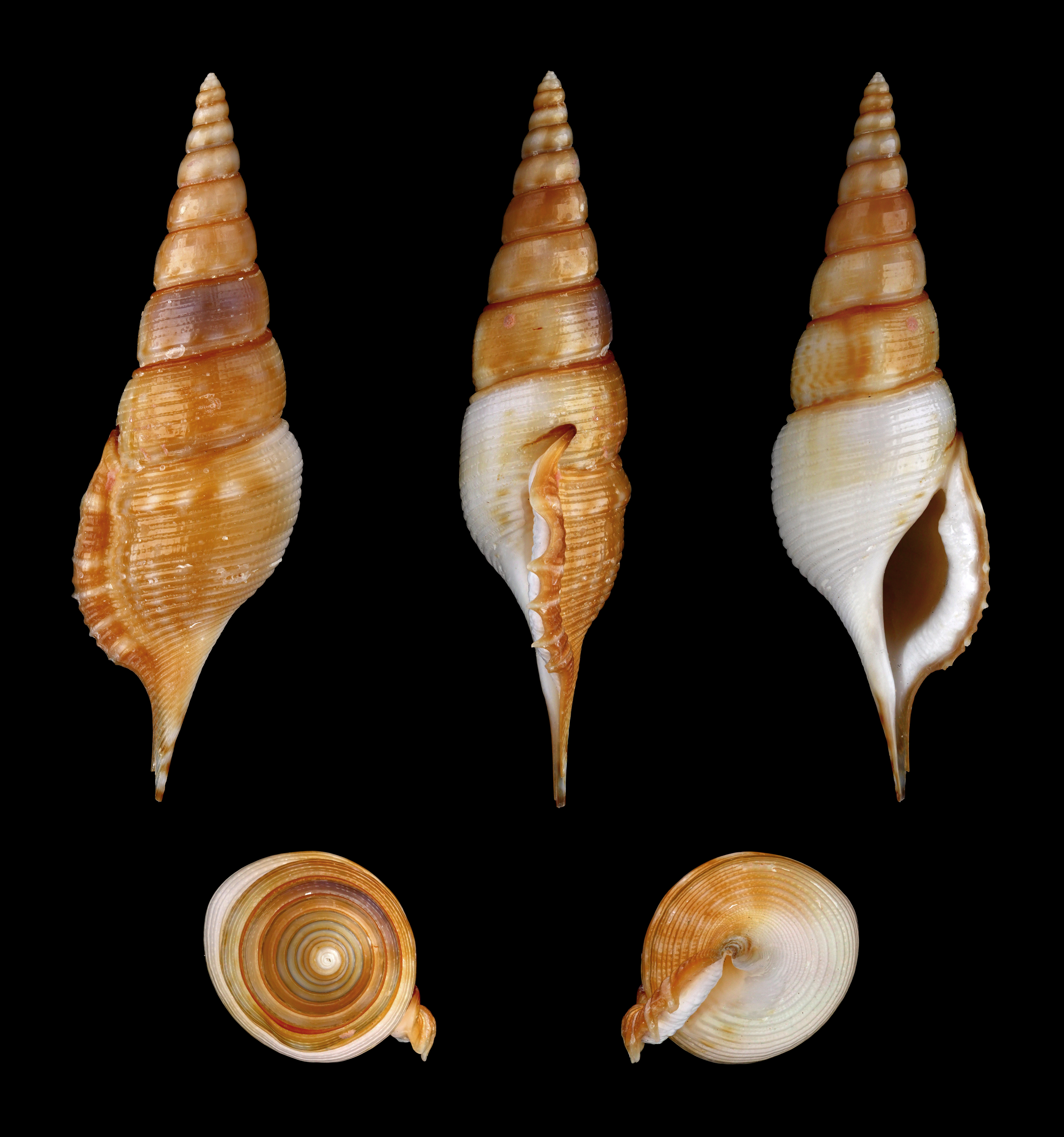
- Five views of a shell of Rimellopsis powisii

Scientific classification
- Kingdom: Animalia
- Phylum: Mollusca
- Class: Gastropoda
- Subclass: Caenogastropoda
- Order: Littorinimorpha
- Family: Rostellariidae
- Genus: Rimellopsis
- Species: R. powisii

Binomial name
- Rimellopsis powisii (Petit de la Saussaye, 1840)

Synonyms
- Rostellaria powisii Petit de la Saussaye, 1840 (original combination); Rostellaria powisii var. abyssicola Schepman, M.M., 1909; Tibia laurenti Duchamps, 1992; Tibia powisii (Petit de la Saussaye, 1840); Tibia (Sulcogladius) powisii (Petit, 1842)

= Rimellopsis powisii =

Species of gastropod

Rimellopsis powisii, common name Powis's tibia, is a species of large sea snail, a marine gastropod mollusks in the family Rostellariidae within the Stromboidea, the true conchs and their allies.

== Description ==
The length of the shell varies between 30 mm and 75 mm.

== Distribution ==
This marine species occurs from Southern Japan, and in the Indo-West Pacific to New Caledonia and Queensland, Australia.
