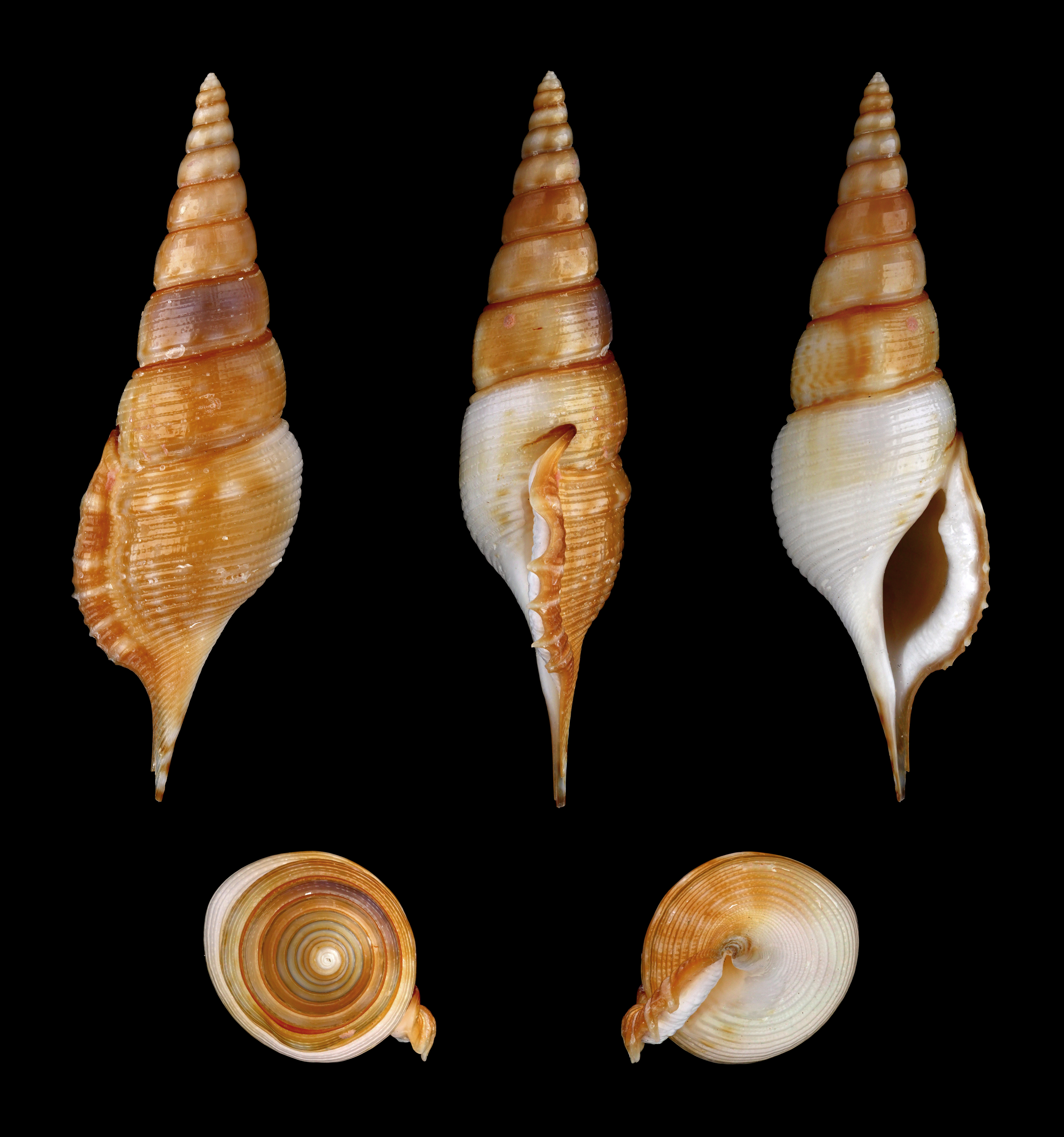
- Five views of a shell of Rimellopsis powisii

Scientific classification
- Kingdom: Animalia
- Phylum: Mollusca
- Class: Gastropoda
- Subclass: Caenogastropoda
- Order: Littorinimorpha
- Superfamily: Stromboidea
- Family: Rostellariidae
- Genus: Rimellopsis; Lambiotte, 1979

Type species
- Rostellaria powisii Petit de la Saussaye, 1840

= Rimellopsis =

Genus of gastropods

Rimellopsis is a genus of large sea snails, marine gastropod mollusks in the family Rostellariidae.

== Species ==
Species within the genus Rimellopsis include:

- Rimellopsis powisii (Petit de la Saussaye, 1840)
