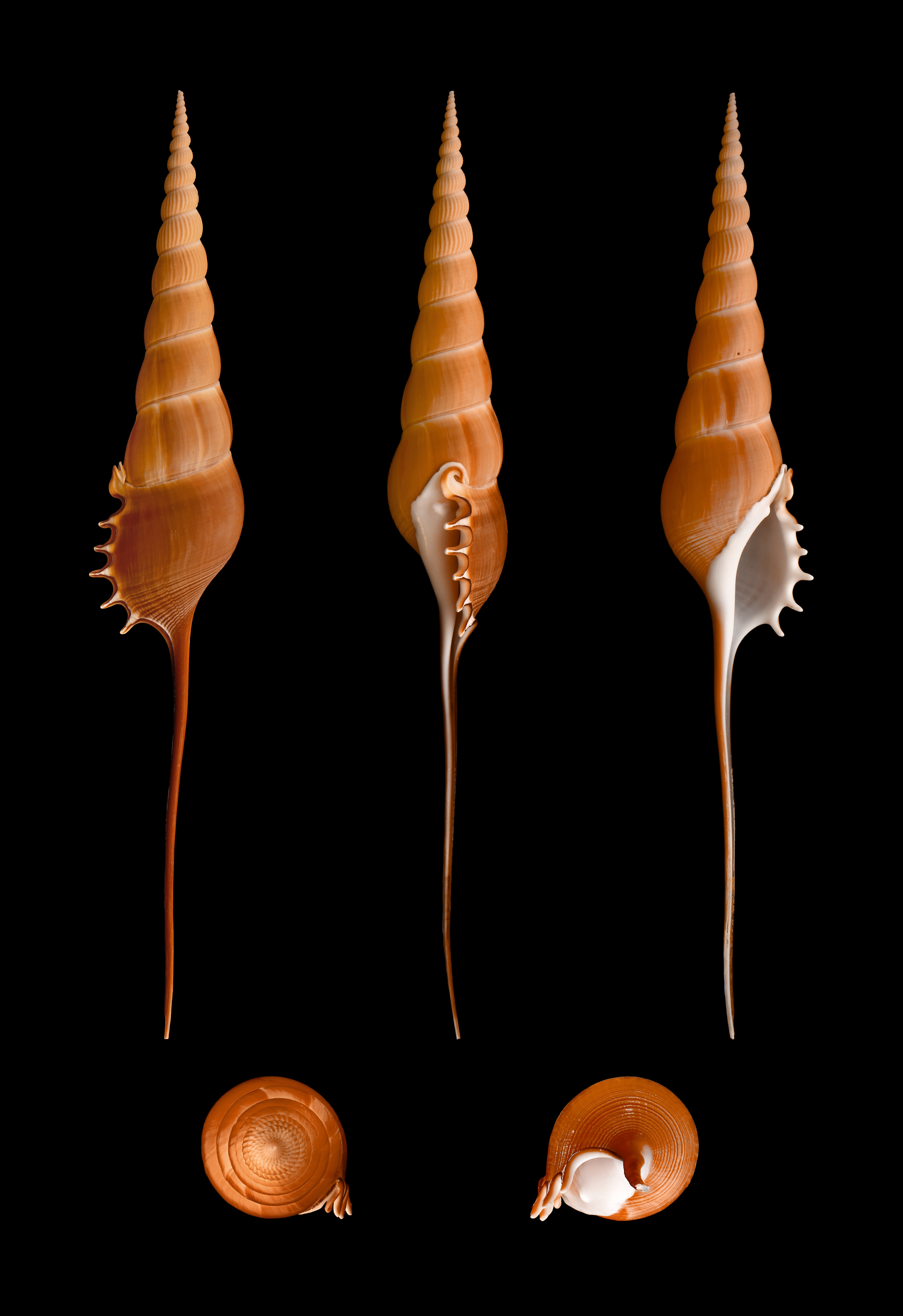
- Five views of a shell of Tibia fusus.

Scientific classification
- Kingdom: Animalia
- Phylum: Mollusca
- Class: Gastropoda
- Subclass: Caenogastropoda
- Order: Littorinimorpha
- Family: Rostellariidae
- Genus: Tibia
- Species: T. fusus

Binomial name
- Tibia fusus Linnaeus, 1758

Synonyms
- Murex fusus Linnaeus, 1758; Rostellaria fusus (Linnaeus, 1758); Rostellaria ionica Perry, 1811; Rostellaria rectirostris Lamarck, 1822; Rostellaria sinensis Perry, 1811; Rostellaria subulata Lamarck, 1801; Strombus clavus Linnaeus, 1771; Strombus unicornis Dillwyn, 1817; Tibia indiarum Röding, 1798

= Tibia fusus =

Species of gastropod

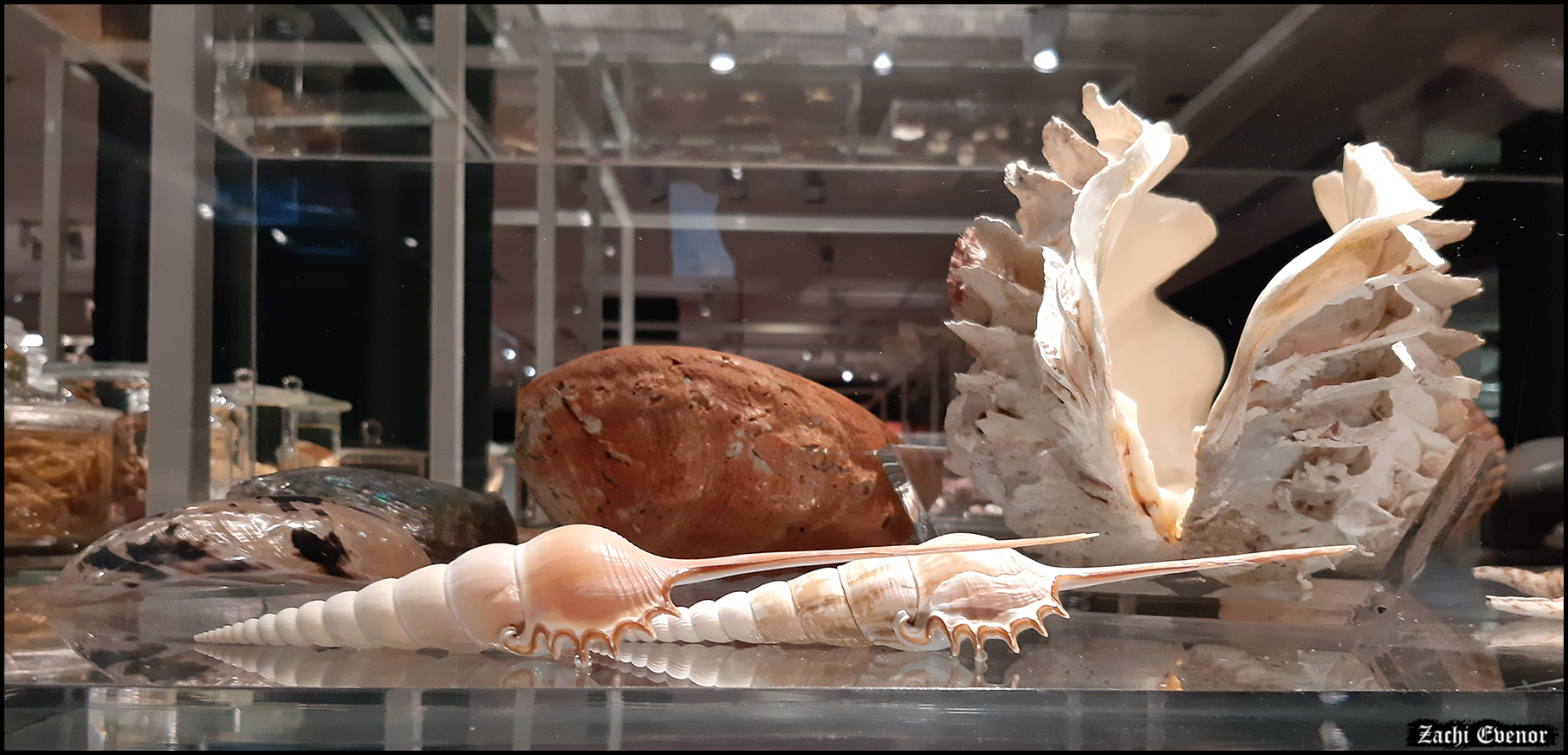
Tibia fusus shells in Steinhardt Museum of Natural History, Israel.

Tibia fusus, common name Spindle tibia or Shinbone Tibia Gastropod, is a species of large sea snail, a marine gastropod mollusk in the family Strombidae, the true conchs.

== Distribution ==
This species is widespread in Eastern Indian Ocean and Western Pacific, from Indochina, China Sea, southern Japan and the Philippines to the Banda Sea, Indonesia, Australia and Oceania.

== Habitat ==
Most Tibia fusus live in tropical offshore waters where there is plenty of sand, at depths of 5 to 50 m.

== Description ==
The shells of Tibia fusus can reach a length of 15–31 centimetres (5.9–12.2 in) (including the long siphonal canal), with a typical length of 23 cm (9 in.). These shells are large, spindle-shaped with moderately convex turns and an extremely long, thin and slightly curved siphonal canal. The basic color ranges from straw yellow to reddish-beige. The aperture is ovate and white inside, with 6 fingerlike growths on the outer lip.

It is a fairly common species where it occurs, but because of its attractive appearance, it is highly sought after by shell collectors.

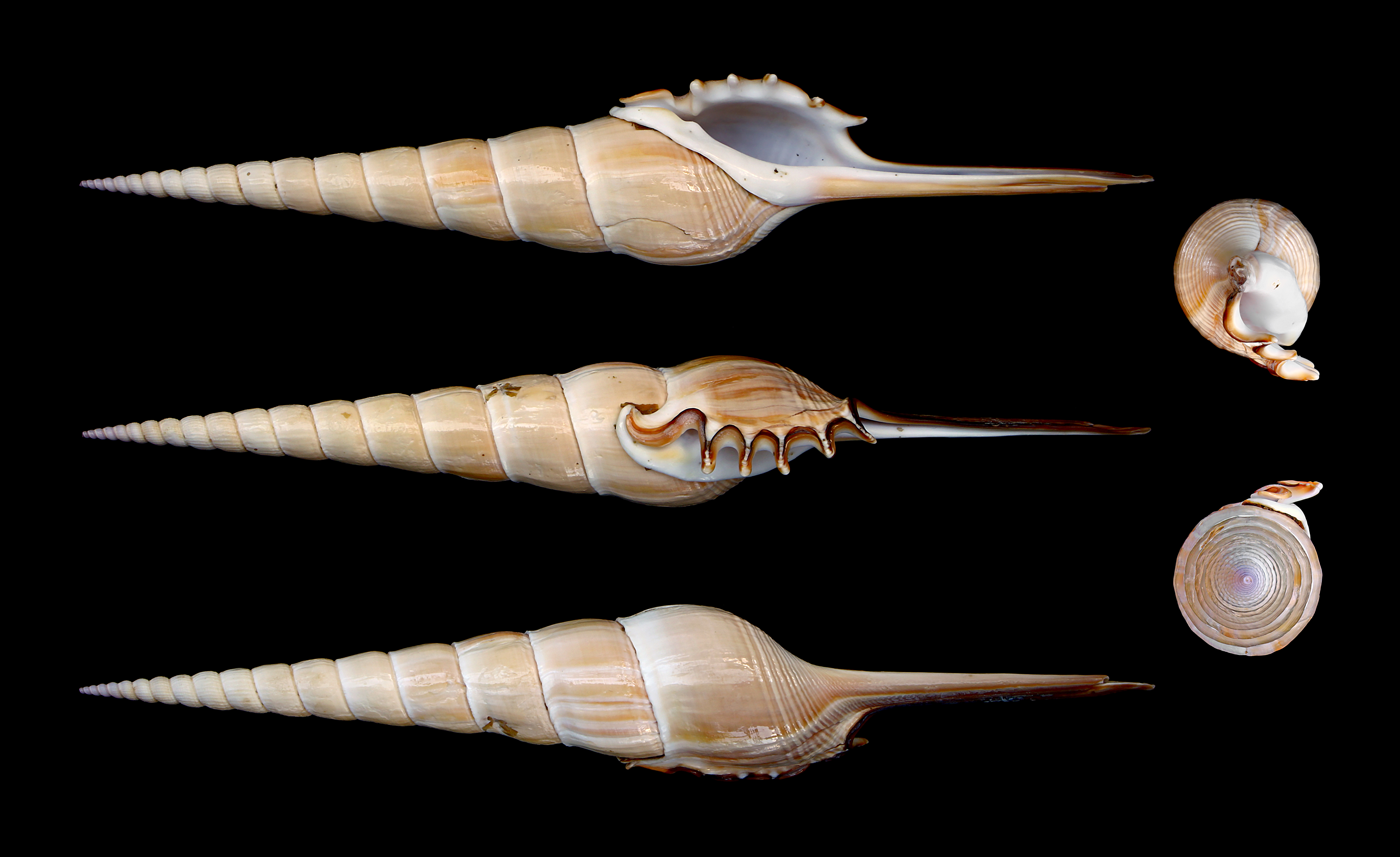

== Life cycle ==
Embryos develop into free-swimming planktonic marine larvae (trochophore) and later into juvenile veligers.

== Bibliography ==
- Walls, J.G. (1980). Conchs, tibias and harps. A survey of the molluscan families Strombidae and Harpidae. T.F.H. Publications Ltd, Hong Kong.
- Koichiro Masuda & CHi-Yue Huang, 1993. Miocene Gastropoda and Scaphopoda in the western foothills of northern Taiwan. Journal of the Geological Society of China (1993)
- Springsteen, F.J. & Leobrera, F.M. 1986. Shells of the Philippines
