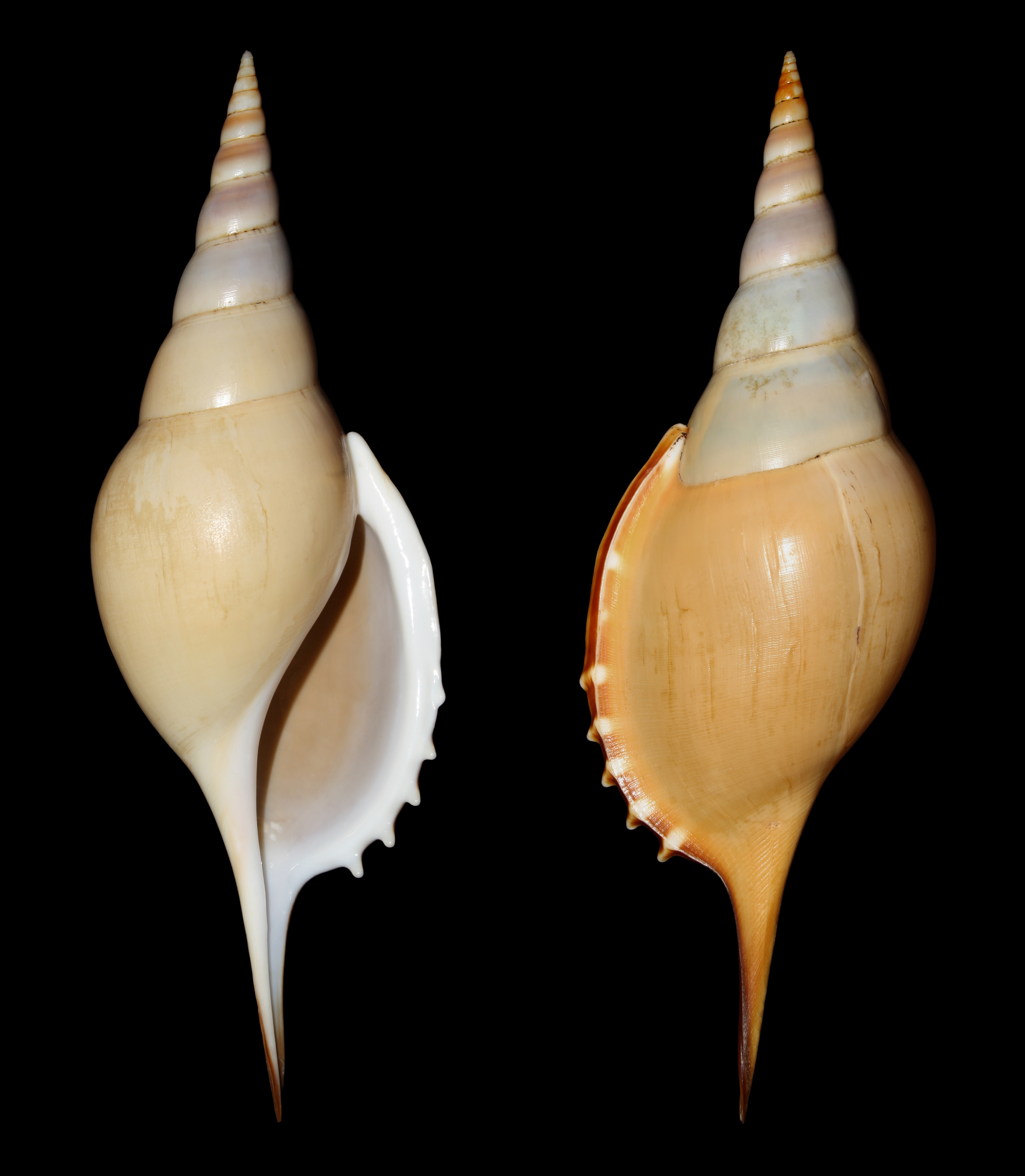
- A shell of Rostellariella martinii.

Scientific classification
- Kingdom: Animalia
- Phylum: Mollusca
- Class: Gastropoda
- Subclass: Caenogastropoda
- Order: Littorinimorpha
- Family: Rostellariidae
- Genus: Rostellariella; Thiele, 1929

Type species
- Rostellaria delicatula G. Nevill, 1881

= Rostellariella =

Genus of gastropods

Rostellariella is a genus of sea snails, marine gastropod mollusks in the family Rostellariidae within the Stromboidea, the true conchs and their allies.

== Species ==
Species within the genus Rostellariella include:

- Rostellariella barbieri Morrison, 2008
- Rostellariella delicatula (Nevill, 1881) - Synonym of Tibia delicatula Nevill, 1881
- Rostellariella lorenzi Morrison, 2005
- Rostellariella martinii (Marrat, 1877)
