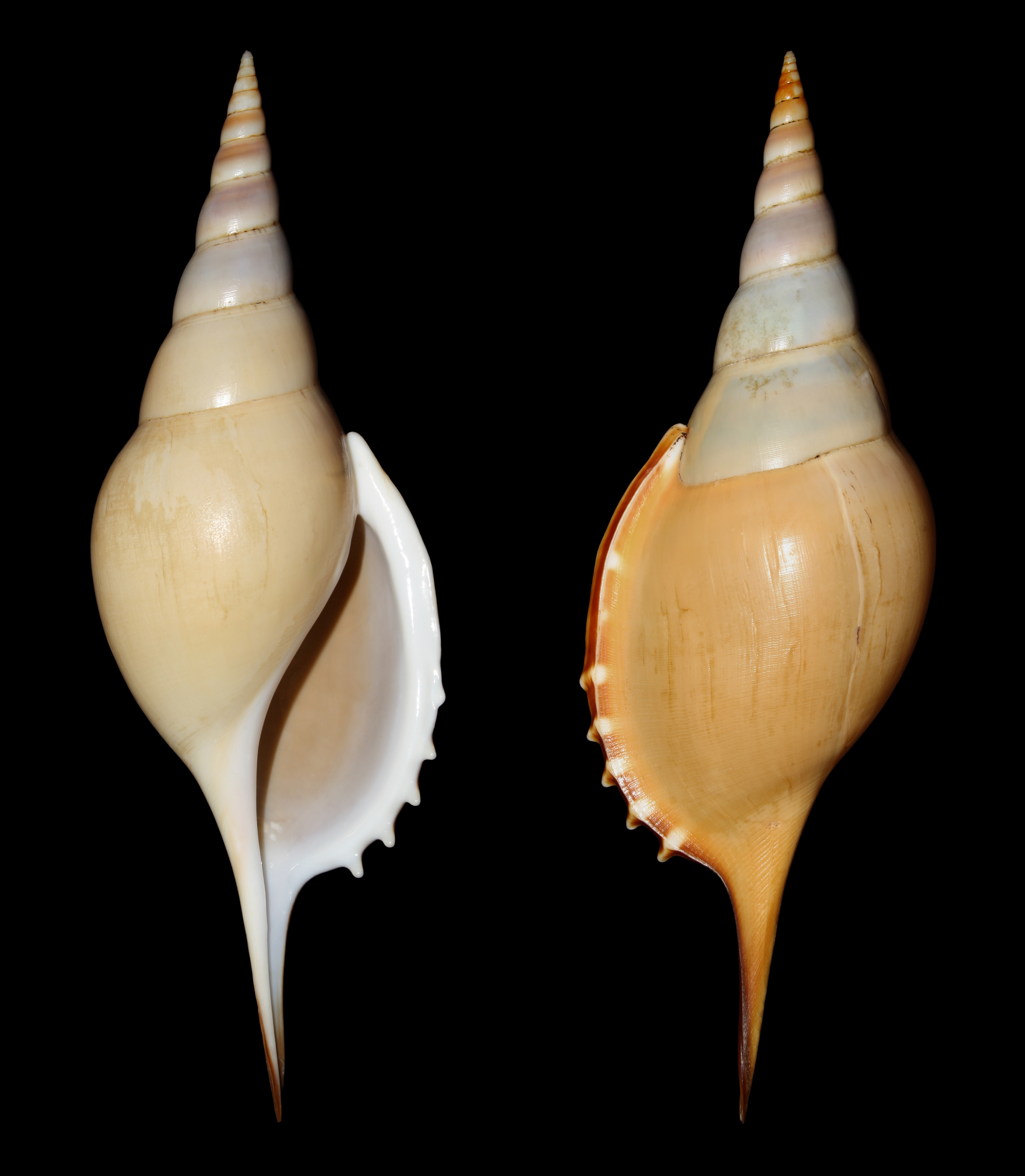
- A shell of Rostellariella martinii.

Scientific classification
- Kingdom: Animalia
- Phylum: Mollusca
- Class: Gastropoda
- Subclass: Caenogastropoda
- Order: Littorinimorpha
- Family: Rostellariidae
- Genus: Rostellariella
- Species: R. martinii

Binomial name
- Rostellariella martinii (Marrat, 1877)

Synonyms
- Gladius martinii Marrat, 1877 (original combination); Tibia martinii (Marrat, 1877); Tenuitibia martinii (Marrat, 1877) (accepted name)

= Rostellariella martinii =

Species of gastropod

Rostellariella martinii, commonly named the Martini's tibia, is a species of sea snail, a marine gastropod mollusk in the family Rostellariidae within the Stromboidea, the true conchs and their relatives. As noted on World Register of Marine Species (WoRMS), the accepted name is Tenuitibia martinii.

== Description ==
=== External Shell and Structure ===
Specimens of R. martinii range from 119-158mm. The original description by Marrat in 1877, under the original name Gladius martinii, is as follows,

"G. testa fusiform, pale yellow-spadiceous, above with a dark livid band girdled near the suture, spiral towering; anteriorly rounded, subinflated, all very densely transversely punctate-striated, neatly cancelled, near the sutures bisulcate, the last most swollen, widely expanded; lip five or six-toothed, externally dark-spotted, above calloused, shortly caniculated-produced and curled; columella arcuate, white, pale chestnut maw; canals very short, barely recurved." (Translated from Latin)

Photos of R. martinii show the shell as yellow, tan, or lightly orange colored. The shell itself is relatively thin. The spire is significantly pointed, and the shell also has an even more severely pointed tail spire. Most specimen photos show ten whorls on the teleoconch with one protoconch whorl.

=== Living Snail ===
The living animal that resides within the shell described above has lens eyes.

== Distribution and Habitat ==
This marine species occurs between Taiwan and Borneo, with several documented specimens being found in dredged samples off of the Philippine Islands, specifically Luzon Island and Cebu. R. martinii is a marine species that resides between 100 and 200 meters deep.

== Behavior ==
=== Locomotion ===
R. martinii utilizes mucus mediated gliding.

=== Reproduction ===
R. martinii reproduces sexually.
