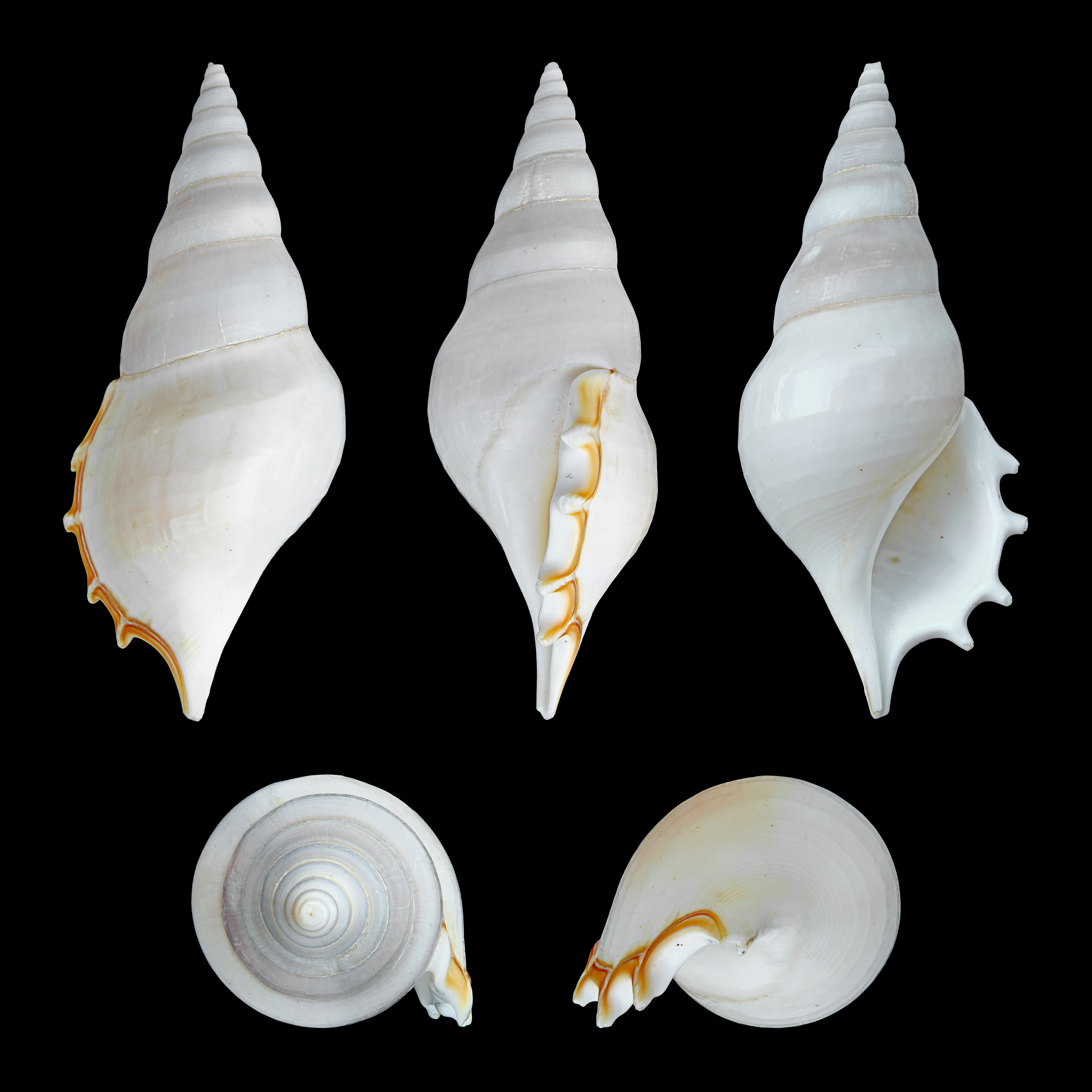

Scientific classification
- Kingdom: Animalia
- Phylum: Mollusca
- Class: Gastropoda
- Subclass: Caenogastropoda
- Order: Littorinimorpha
- Family: Rostellariidae
- Genus: Rostellariella
- Species: R. delicatula

Binomial name
- Rostellariella delicatula (Nevill, 1881)

Synonyms
- Rostellaria delicatula G. Nevill, 1881 (original combination); Rostellaria delicatula var. quatuordenticulata Melvill & Standen, 1905; Rostellaria delicatula var. quinquedenticulata Melvill & Standen, 1905; Rostellaria delicatula var. tridenticulata Melvill & Standen, 1905 junior subjective synonym; Tibia delicatula (Nevill, 1881); Tibia deliculata [sic] (misspelling)

= Rostellariella delicatula =

Species of gastropod

Rostellariella delicatula, commonly known as the delicate tibia, is a species of sea snail, a marine gastropod mollusk in the family Rostellariidae, the true conchs.

== Description ==
The size of the shell varies between 45 mm and 110 mm.

(Original description) This species immediately stands out from all other living members of its genus due to its thin, delicate, and translucent composition, a characteristic that suggests a significant link to certain fossil forms.

Its color is a pale ochraceous brown, with the body whorl decorated by four narrow white bands. Each of these bands ends in one of the four projecting, digitate processes of the outer lip; only one such band is visible in the middle of the preceding four whorls. The spire measures just under half the total shell length, with a moderately acute apex.

The shell features 10 ½ moderately convex whorls. The body whorl is conspicuously convex and tumid, and like the one before it, shows a slight sutural depression. It extends at the base into a short siphonal canal, which is relatively less developed than in any other known species. This "canal" is slightly tortuously deflected.

The first three or four whorls are sculptureless. The next three or four are inconspicuously but regularly spirally striated, with about ten filiform and slightly punctured striae that become obsolete on the last two whorls. However, they reappear more coarsely developed at the very base of the body whorl. Additionally, five somewhat inconspicuous varices are present at intervals on the last four whorls. These also exhibit minute longitudinal striation under a lens, with the striae being close-set, fine, and flexuous.

The aperture is oval and rather large, with a thickened and elongated peristome that bears four equidistant, relatively small, digitate processes.

== Distribution ==
This marine species occurs from the Gulf of Aden and East Africa to Sumatra, Indonesia; also in the Bay of Bengal.
