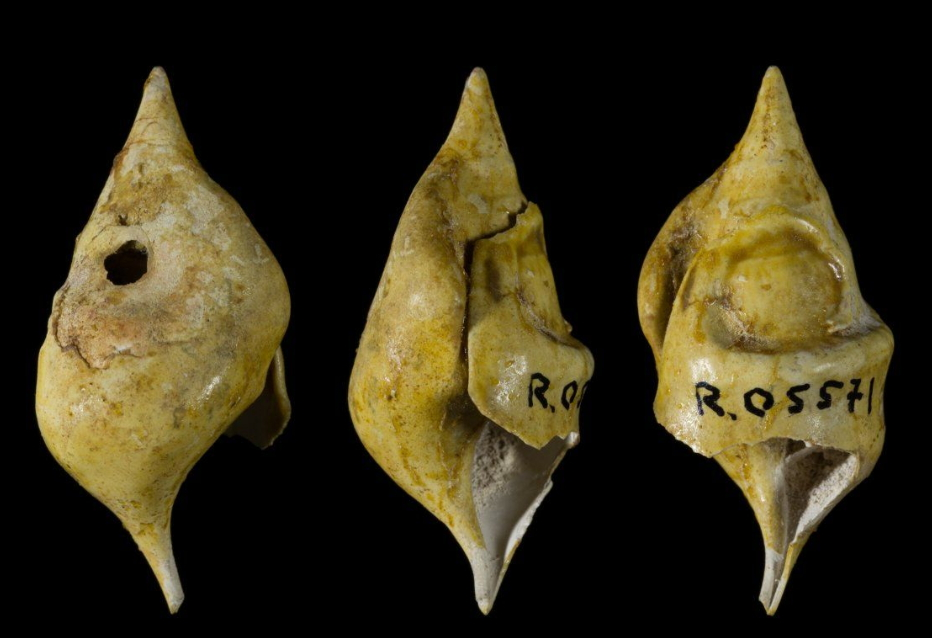
- Shell of Calyptraphorus termieri (syntype at MNHN, Paris)

Scientific classification
- Kingdom: Animalia
- Phylum: Mollusca
- Class: Gastropoda
- Subclass: Caenogastropoda
- Order: Littorinimorpha
- Family: Rostellariidae
- Genus: †Calyptraphorus; Conrad, 1857

Species
- See text

= Calyptraphorus =

Calyptraphorus Temporal range: Campanian–Pliocene

Extinct genus of gastropod

Calyptraphorus, also known by its alternative spelling Calyptrophoris, is an extinct genus of sorbeochonid gastropod that belongs to the family Rostellariidae. It had a global distribution occurring from the Cretaceous period to the mid-Pliocene epoch. Members of this genus were likely epifaunal grazers.

== Evolutionary history ==
The earliest records of this genus date back to the Cretaceous period possibly during the Campanian age although it seems that the formation was found in is possibly Maastrichtian age. During the Cretaceous, members of this genus can be found in Mexico and Mali. This genus would subsequently survive the Cretaceous-Paleogene extinction event (K-Pg) that ended the Mesozoic era. During the Paleogene, this genus can be found in a wide range of places including Mexico, United States (Texas, Alabama, Louisiana, South Carolina, Virginia, New Jersey and Maryland), Mali and Nigeria. During the Eocene epoch their range would include Mexico, Peru, the United States (Alabama, Mississippi, Louisiana, Arkansas, Texas, Virginia, New Jersey and Maryland) India and Saudi Arabia.

It was thought that Calyptraphorus had become extinct before the end of the Eocene epoch. However a single specimen that has not been described a species was found in the Tartaro Formation in Northern Luzon (Philippines). This means that the genus temporal range was extended by 30 million years going extinct during the mid-Pliocene epoch. This would also make Calyptraphorus a Lazarus taxon disappearing from the fossil record for a long period of time and reappearing.

== Taxonomy ==
=== Species ===
This genus currently contains 17 described species. A list of them can be found below:

- Calyptraphorus afra (É. Vincent, 1913)
- Calyptraphorus africanus L. R. Cox, 1952
- Calyptraphorus binodiferus Perrilliat & Vega, 1997
- Calyptraphorus chelonites C. A. White, 1887
- Calyptraphorus ewekoroensis (Adegoke, 1977)
- Calyptraphorus hollandi Cossmann & Pissarro, 1909
- Calyptraphorus hopkinsi Olsson, 1934
- Calyptraphorus itamaracensis Muñiz, 1993
- Calyptraphorus jacksoni W. B. Clark, 1895
- Calyptraphorus lissoni
- Calyptraphorus stamineus (Conrad, 1855)
- Calyptraphorus septentrionalis Stanton, 1921
- Calyptraphorus stamineus (Conrad, 1855)
- Calyptraphorus termieri Salvan, 1955
- Calyptraphorus terrysmithae Perrilliat, 2013
- Calyptraphorus velata
- Calyptraphorus velatus

This genus also currently contains several (nine) species who lack formal opinion data. Below is a list of these species:

- Calyptraphorus aldrichi J. A. Gardner, 1935
- Calyptraphorus carrizensis J. A. Gardner, 1945
- Calyptraphorus compressus (Aldrich, 1894)
- Calyptraphorus indicus Cossmann & Pissarro, 1909
- Calyptraphorus popenoe J. A. Gardner, 1935
- Calyptraphorus trinodiferus Conrad, 1857
- Calyptraphorus velates
- Calyptraphorus velatus (Conrad, 1833)
- Calyptraphorus velusus
