= National Memorial Hall For Israel's Fallen =

Monument in Jerusalem (2017)

- היכל הזיכרון הממלכתי לחללי מערכות ישראל
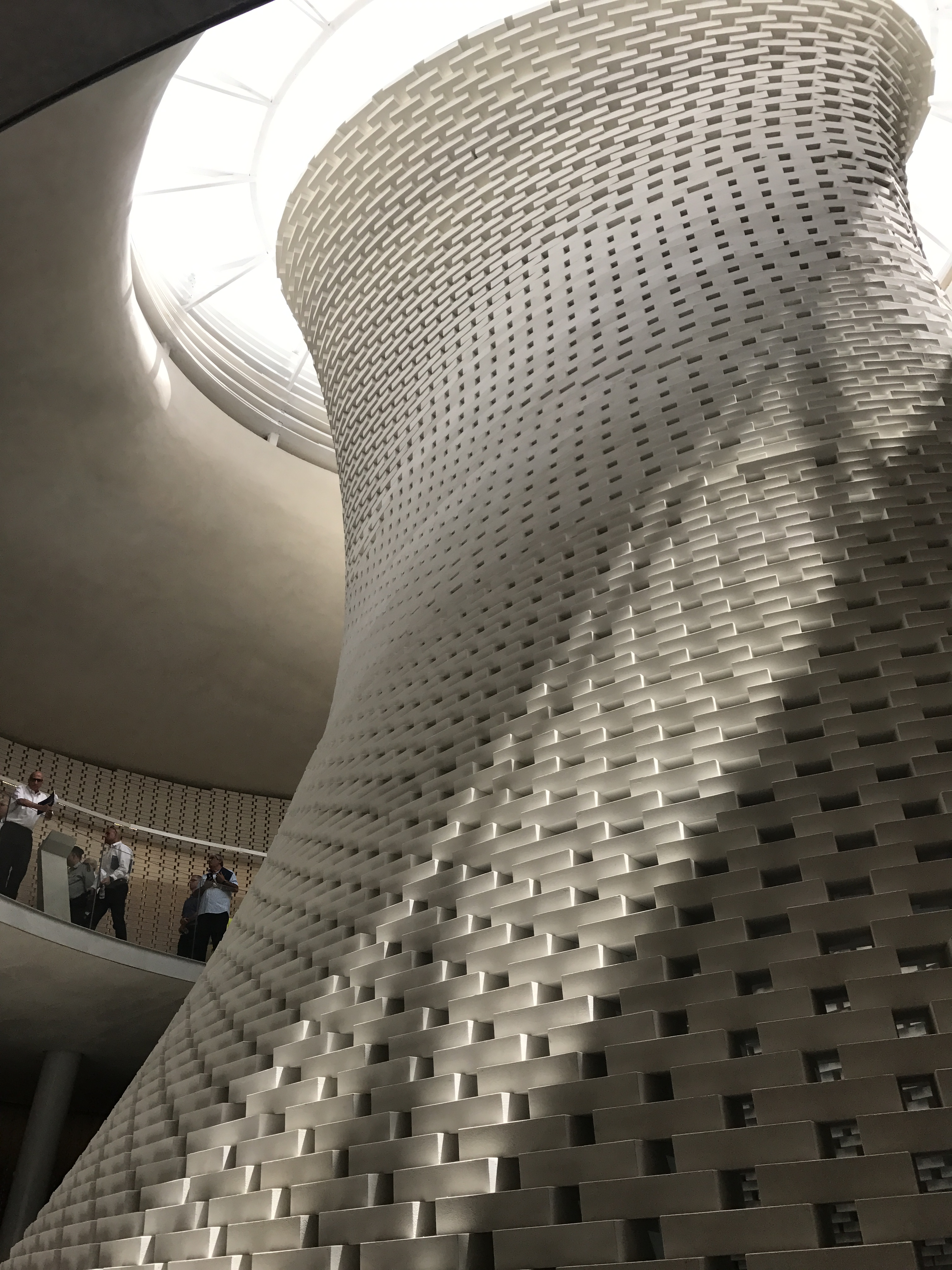
- Location: Mount Herzl, Jerusalem
- Coordinates: 31.7754°N 35.1830°E
- Designer: Kimmel Eshkolot Architects
- Completion date: 2017
- Website: https://www.izkor.gov.il/en/

The National Memorial Hall for Israel's Fallen (Hebrew: היכל הזיכרון הממלכתי לחללי מערכות ישראל) is a national memorial for all soldiers who gave their lives establishing and defending the State of Israel. The memorial was commissioned by the Israeli Ministry of Defense to provide a central place of pilgrimage for all bereaved families to commemorate their lost loved ones. Daily memorial services are held to honor the anniversary of each soldier's death.

The memorial is located on Mount Herzl in Jerusalem.

== Design ==
The hall was designed to preserve the memory of all fallen soldiers while providing visitors with both a personal and collective experience of commemoration. The hall's central atrium consists of an undulating funnel designed to symbolize a torch and an eternal flame. Approximately 23,000 bricks wrap around the hall's spiral staircase, forming a 250-meter-long "wall of names." Each brick is "individually engraved with the name of a fallen soldier, the date the soldier was killed and a candle to be lit on the anniversary of the soldier’s death."

The exterior of the hall echoes the topography of the surrounding mountain landscape.

== See also ==
- Australian War Memorial
- Canadian National Vimy Memorial
- National War Memorial (Canada)
- Poklonnaya Hill
- Arlington National Cemetery
- List of Australian military memorials
