= Kimmel Eshkolot Architects =

Kimmel-Eshkolot Architects is an Israeli architecture firm, founded by Etan Kimmel and Michal Kimmel-Eshkolot in Tel Aviv, Israel in 1986. In its first years of practice, the firm was involved in the preservation and rehabilitation of Neve Tzedek, the historical neighborhood of Tel Aviv. Throughout the years the firm won several national competitions for the design of high-profile public projects in Israel, such as the new expansion of the government compound ("Kiryat Hamemshala") in Jerusalem, the Davidson Museum in the Archaeological Park near the Western Wall and the Memorial Center for Israeli military casualties at Mount Herzl.
In 2011 the firm won the Rechter Prize for Architecture, considered to be the most prestigious award for architecture in Israel. It received the award for the design of a rehabilitation center for IDF disabled veterans, located in Be'er Sheva. This project was also selected for project of the year in the international competition of the magazine Israeli Architecture.

== Selected projects ==
Project	
The Diller Center- Ben-Gurion University of the Negev	
Bet- Halochem, Beer Sheva	Bet-Halochem, Beer Sheva
The Steinhardt Museum of Nature, Tel-Aviv University	The Steinhardt Museum of Nature, Tel-Aviv University
Davidson Center- Jerusalem	
National Memorial Hall For Israel's Fallen	National Memorial Hall For Israel's Fallen
