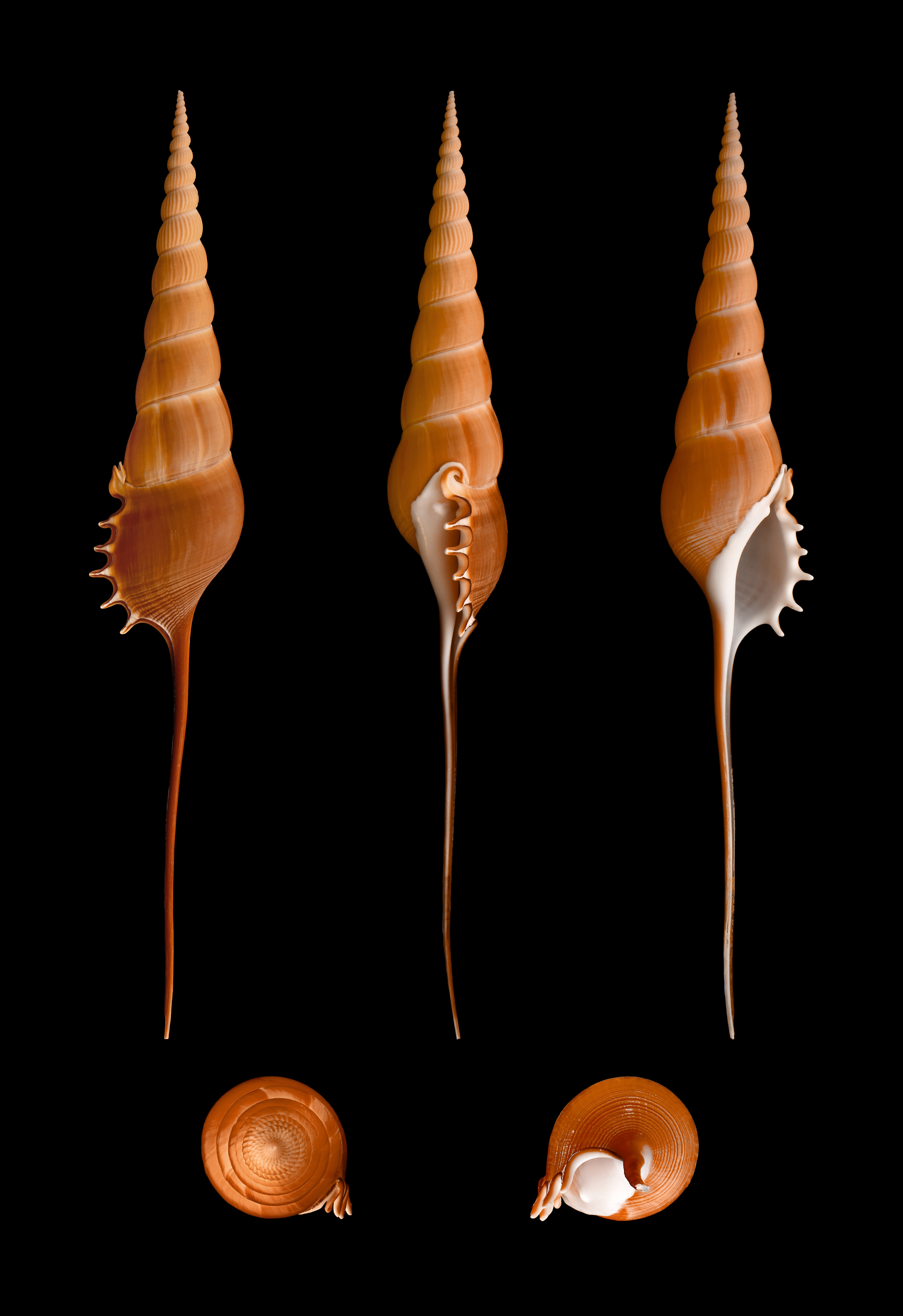
- Five views of a shell of Tibia fusus

Scientific classification
- Kingdom: Animalia
- Phylum: Mollusca
- Class: Gastropoda
- Subclass: Caenogastropoda
- Order: Littorinimorpha
- Superfamily: Stromboidea
- Family: Rostellariidae; Gabb, 1868

Synonyms
- Tibiidae Golikov & Starobogatov, 1975

= Rostellariidae =

Family of molluscs

Rostellariidae is a family of sea snails, marine gastropod molluscs in the clade Littorinimorpha.

== Taxonomy ==
=== Higher classification ===
Bouchet & Rocroi (2005)

This taxon is ranked at subfamily level Rostellariinae within the family Strombidae in the taxonomy of the Gastropoda (Bouchet & Rocroi, 2005). Above this rank the superfamily Caenogastropoda contains the unranked clades Hypsogastropoda and Littorinimorpha respectively.

Morrison (2008)

Rostellariidae is ranked at family level for example by Morrison (2008).

=== Genera ===
The family consists of the following genera:

- † Africoterebellum Eames, 1957
- † Amekichilus Eames, 1957
- † Amplogladius Cossmann, 1889
- † Calyptraphorus Conrad, 1857
- † Cyclomolops Gabb, 1868
- † Cyrtulotibia Eames, 1957
- † Dientomochilus Cossmann, 1904
- † Digitolabrum Cossmann, 1904
- † Ectinochilus Cossmann, 1889
- † Eotibia B. L. Clark, 1942
- † Mauryna de Gregorio, 1880
- † Rimella Agassiz, 1841
- Rimellopsis Lambiotte, 1979
- Rostellariella Thiele, 1929
- Strombolaria de Gregorio, 1880
- † Sulcogladius Sacco, 1893
- † Terebellomimus Pacaud, 2008
- † Terebellopsis Leymerie, 1846
- Tibia Röding, 1798 (synonyms: Gladius Mörch, 1852; Rostellaria Lamarck, 1799; Rostellum Montfort, 1810)
