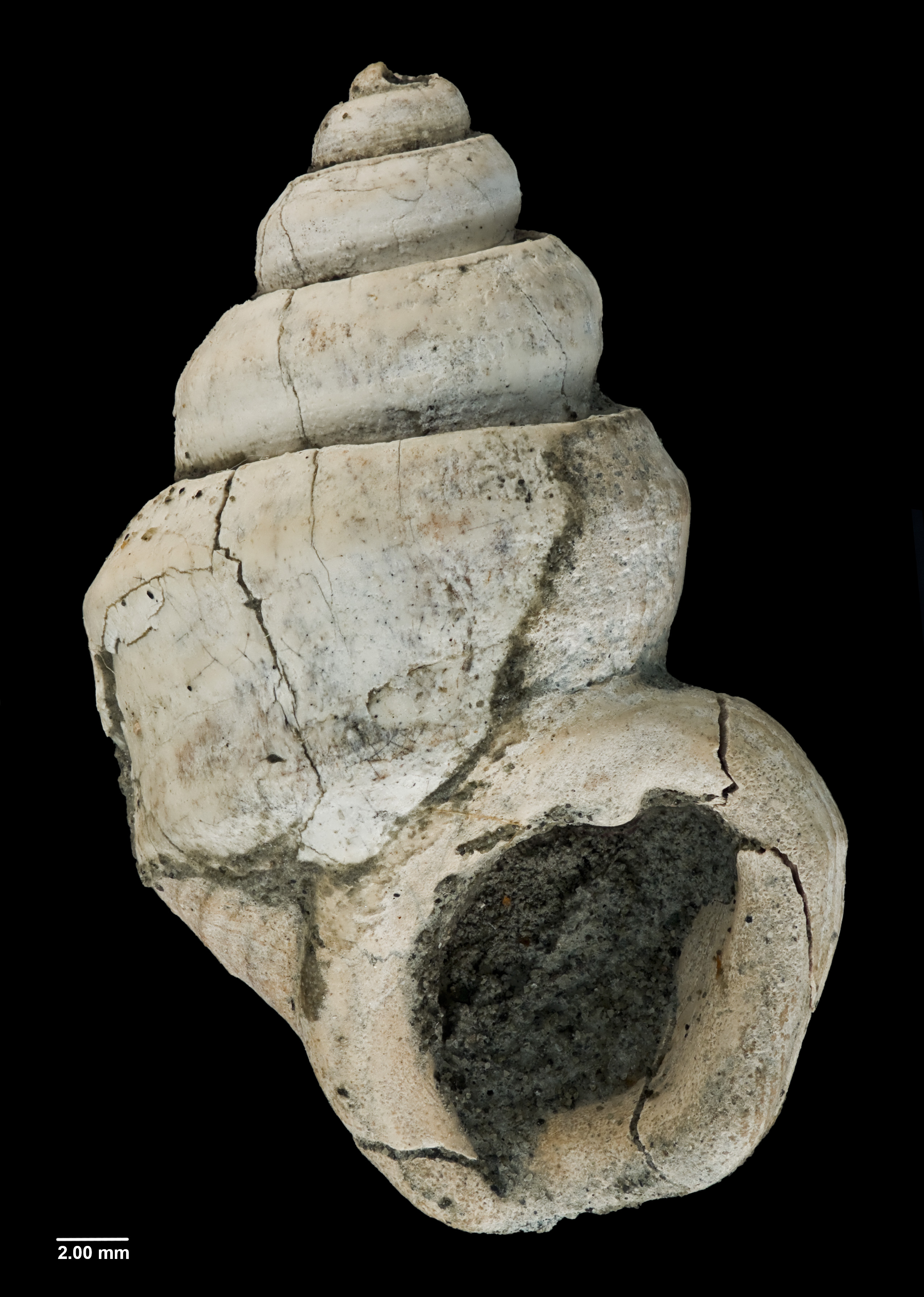
- Holotype from Auckland War Memorial Museum

Scientific classification
- Kingdom: Animalia
- Phylum: Mollusca
- Class: Gastropoda
- Subclass: Caenogastropoda
- Order: Littorinimorpha
- Family: Struthiolariidae
- Genus: Struthiolaria
- Species: S. incrassata

Binomial name
- Struthiolaria incrassata A. W. B. Powell, 1931

Synonyms
- Pelicaria incrassata A. W. B. Powell, 1931; Struthiolaria (Pelicaria) incrassata A. W. B. Powell, 1931

= Struthiolaria incrassata =

Struthiolaria incrassata Temporal range: late Pliocene

Extinct species of gastropod

Struthiolaria incrassata is an extinct species of sea snail, a marine gastropod mollusc in the family Struthiolariidae. Fossils of the species date to late Pliocene strata of the Tangahoe Formation in New Zealand.

== Description ==
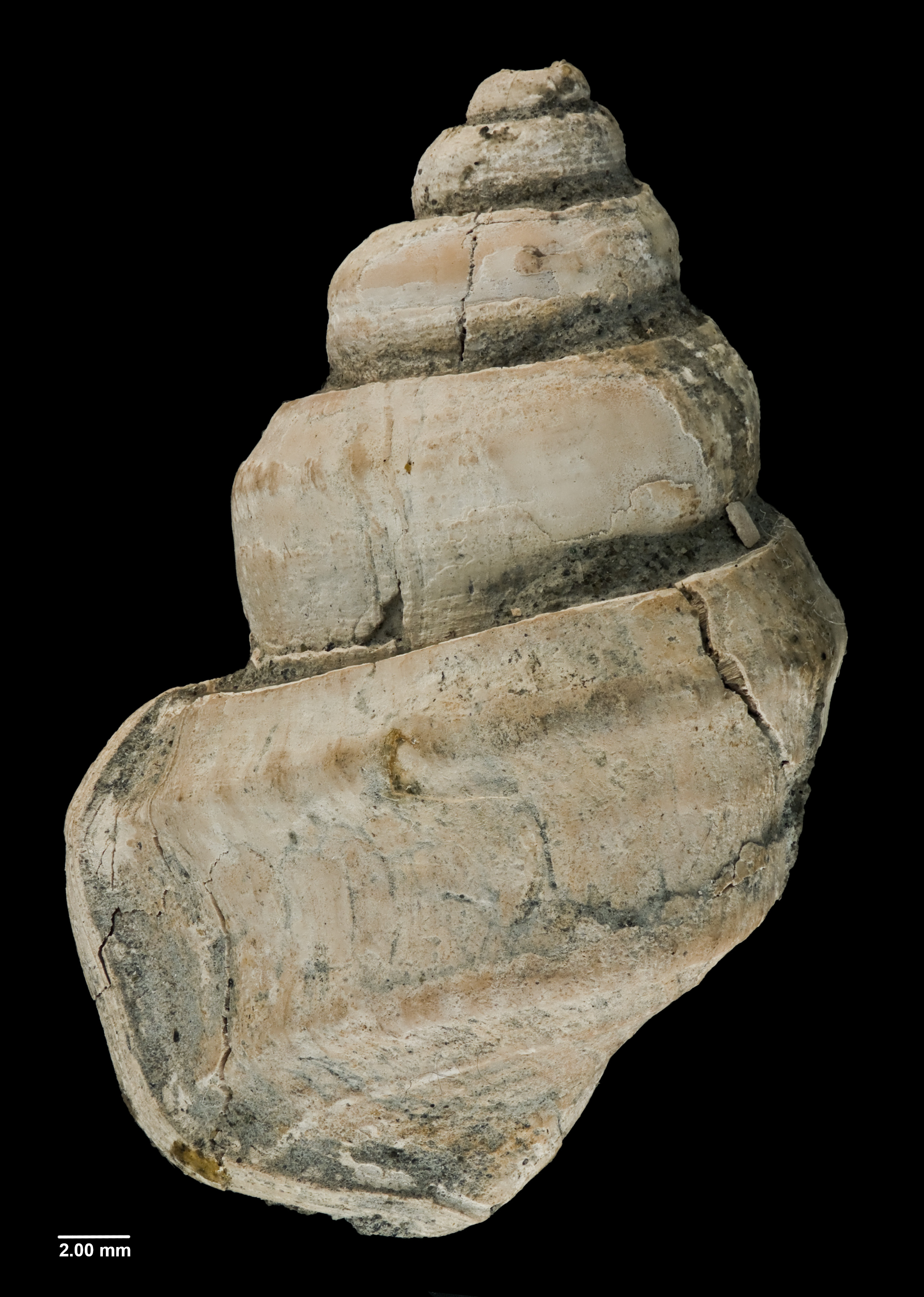
Reverse view of holotype

In the original description, Powell described the species as follows:

This species is characterized by its massive outer lip, prominent parietal tubercle, small aperture, canaliculate suture and strongly bicarinate body-whorl. The upper carina bears rather closely spaced blunt nodules, undeveloped except over the body-whorl, where they gradually gain strength towards the aperture. There are faint traces of an obsolete third spiral situated midway between the two carinae. The aperture is proportionately small and very much thickened all round. In vermis the aperture is much larger and the outer-lip callus extends to about half way between the main carinae, whereas in incrassata it terminates very little above the level of the lower carina. Whorls four to five (five in holotype), exclusive of the missing nuclear whorls. Spire normally, about equal to height of aperture. The holotype has been slightly flattened and elongated by pressure, the smaller specimen exhibiting the true proportions. Suture deeply canaliculate, almost comparable to that of sclandiae. The base exhibits a primitive condition in the development of only five basal spirals.

The holotype of the species has an estimated height of 23.5 mm (0.93 in), and a diameter of 24.75 mm (0.974 in). It is a small member of its genus, and can be identified due to having only two prominent spiral cords. It can be distinguished from a morphologically similar species, Pelicaria parva, due to parva having a third, prominent narrow carina located between the two major carina, the upper carina being nodulous.

== Taxonomy ==
The species was first described by A. W. B. Powell in 1931, who used the name Struthiolaria (Pelicaria) incrassata. While the accepted name became Pelicaria incrassata, in 2010 based on a suggestion by Phillip A. Maxwell, A. G. Beu placed the species in the genus Struthiolaria, due to the relatively tall and narrow shape, the species only having two spiral cords, the small aperture, the thickened sinuous lips and the large parietal tubercule. The holotype was collected in January 1931 from near the mouth of Waihi Stream near Hāwera, Taranaki, and is held in the collections of Auckland War Memorial Museum.

== Distribution ==
This extinct marine species occurs in late Pliocene (Waipipian) strata of the Tangahoe Formation, primarily associated with the Taranaki and Manawatū–Whanganui regions of New Zealand. Fossils of the species have been found near Hāwera, South Taranaki.
