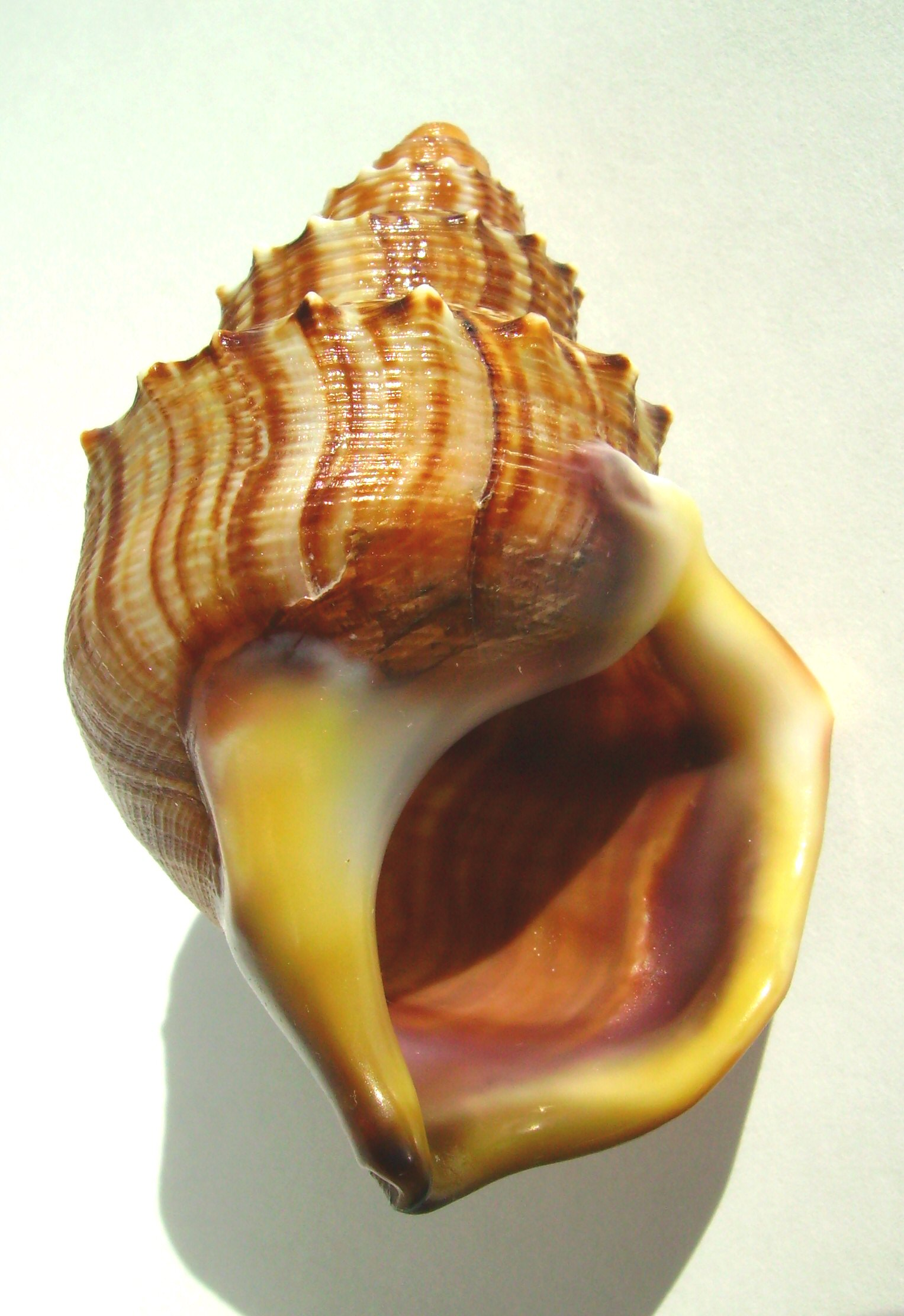
- An apertural view of a shell of the ostrich foot, Struthiolaria papulosa

Scientific classification
- Kingdom: Animalia
- Phylum: Mollusca
- Class: Gastropoda
- Subclass: Caenogastropoda
- Order: Littorinimorpha
- Family: Struthiolariidae
- Genus: Struthiolaria; Lamarck, 1816

Type species
- Struthiolaria nodulosa Lamarck, 1816

Species
- See text

Synonyms
- † Struthiolaria (Callusaria) Finlay, 1926 · accepted, alternate representation; Struthiolaria (Struthiolaria) Lamarck, 1816 · accepted, alternate representation

= Struthiolaria =

Genus of gastropods

Struthiolaria, commonly known as the ostrich foot snails, is a genus of sea snails, marine gastropod molluscs in the family Struthiolariidae.

== Species ==
Species within the genus Struthiolaria include:

- † Struthiolaria arthritica Bartrum & Powell, 1928
- † Struthiolaria calcar Hutton, 1886
- † Struthiolaria callosa Marwick, 1924
- † Struthiolaria cincta Hutton, 1873
- † Struthiolaria cingulata Zittel, 1864
- † Struthiolaria errata Marwick, 1924
- † Struthiolaria firthi Marwick, 1948
- † Struthiolaria frazeri Hutton, 1917
- † Struthiolaria illepida Bartrum & Powell, 1928
- † Struthiolaria incrassata Powell, 1931
- † Struthiolaria lawsi Powell & Bartrum, 1929
- † Struthiolaria nexa Marwick, 1931
- † Struthiolaria obesa Hutton, 1885
- † Struthiolaria otaioica Laws, 1935
- Struthiolaria papulosa (Martyn, 1784)
- † Struthiolaria praenuntia Marwick, 1926
- † Struthiolaria prior Finlay, 1926
- † Struthiolaria spinifera Marwick, 1924
- † Struthiolaria spinosa Hector, 1886
- † Struthiolaria tuberculata Hutton, 1873

Species brought into synonymy

- † Struthiolaria acuminata Marwick, 1924: synonym of Pelicaria vermis (Martyn, 1784)
- † Struthiolaria ameghinoi Ihering, 1897: synonym of Perissodonta ameghinoi (Ihering, 1897)
- † Struthiolaria convexa Marwick, 1924: synonym of Pelicaria vermis (Martyn, 1784)
- Struthiolaria crenulata Lamarck, 1822: synonym of Pelicaria vermis (Martyn, 1784)
- † Struthiolaria dolorosa L. C. King, 1934: synonym of Struthiolaria cingulata Zittel, 1865
- † Struthiolaria fossa Marwick, 1924: synonym of Pelicaria vermis (Martyn, 1784)
- Struthiolaria gigas Sowerby II, 1842: synonym of Struthiolaria papulosa (Martyn, 1784)
- Struthiolaria inermis G.B. Sowerby I, 1821: synonym of Pelicaria vermis (Martyn, 1784)
- † Struthiolaria media Marwick, 1924: synonym of Pelicaria vermis (Martyn, 1784)
- Struthiolaria mirabilis E. A. Smith, 1875: synonym of Perissodonta mirabilis (E. A. Smith, 1875)
- Struthiolaria nodulosa Lamarck: synonym of Struthiolaria papulosa (Martyn, 1784)
- Struthiolaria scutulata (Gmelin, 1791): synonym of Tylospira scutulata (Gmelin, 1791)
- Struthiolaria tricarinata Lesson, 1841: synonym of Pelicaria vermis (Martyn, 1784)
- Struthiolaria vermis (Martyn, 1784): synonym of Pelicaria vermis (Martyn, 1784)
  - Struthiolaria vermis bradleyi Neef, 1970: as above
  - Struthiolaria vermis flemingi Neef, 1970: as above
  - Struthiolaria vermis grahami Neef, 1970: as above
  - Struthiolaria vermis powelli Neef, 1970: as above
