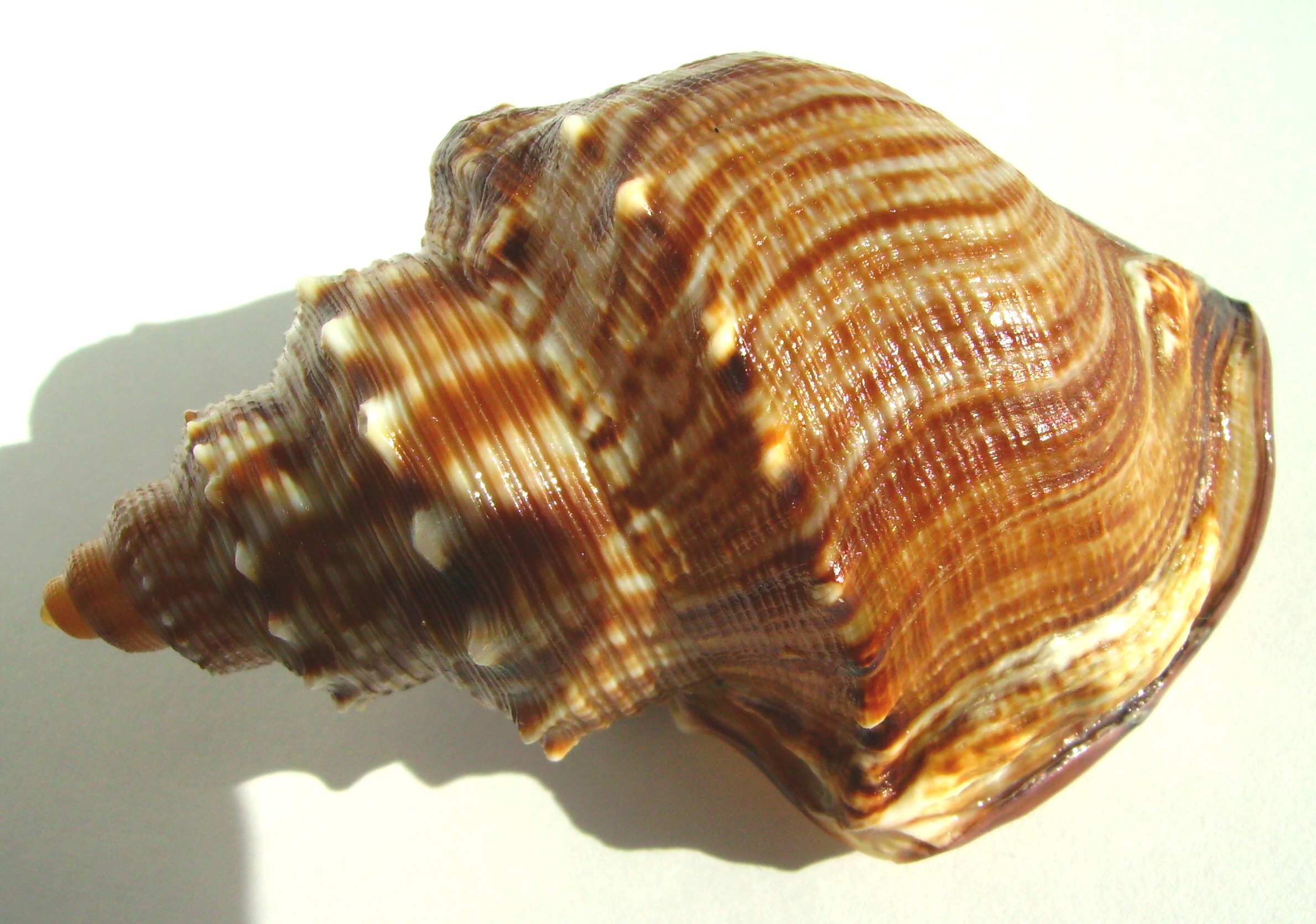
- Dorsal view of a Struthiolaria papulosa shell

Scientific classification
- Kingdom: Animalia
- Phylum: Mollusca
- Class: Gastropoda
- Subclass: Caenogastropoda
- Order: Littorinimorpha
- Family: Struthiolariidae
- Genus: Struthiolaria
- Species: S. papulosa

Binomial name
- Struthiolaria papulosa (Martyn, 1784)

Synonyms
- Buccinum papulosum Martyn, 1784 (basionym); Struthiolaria nodulosa Lamarck, 1816

= Struthiolaria papulosa =

Species of gastropod

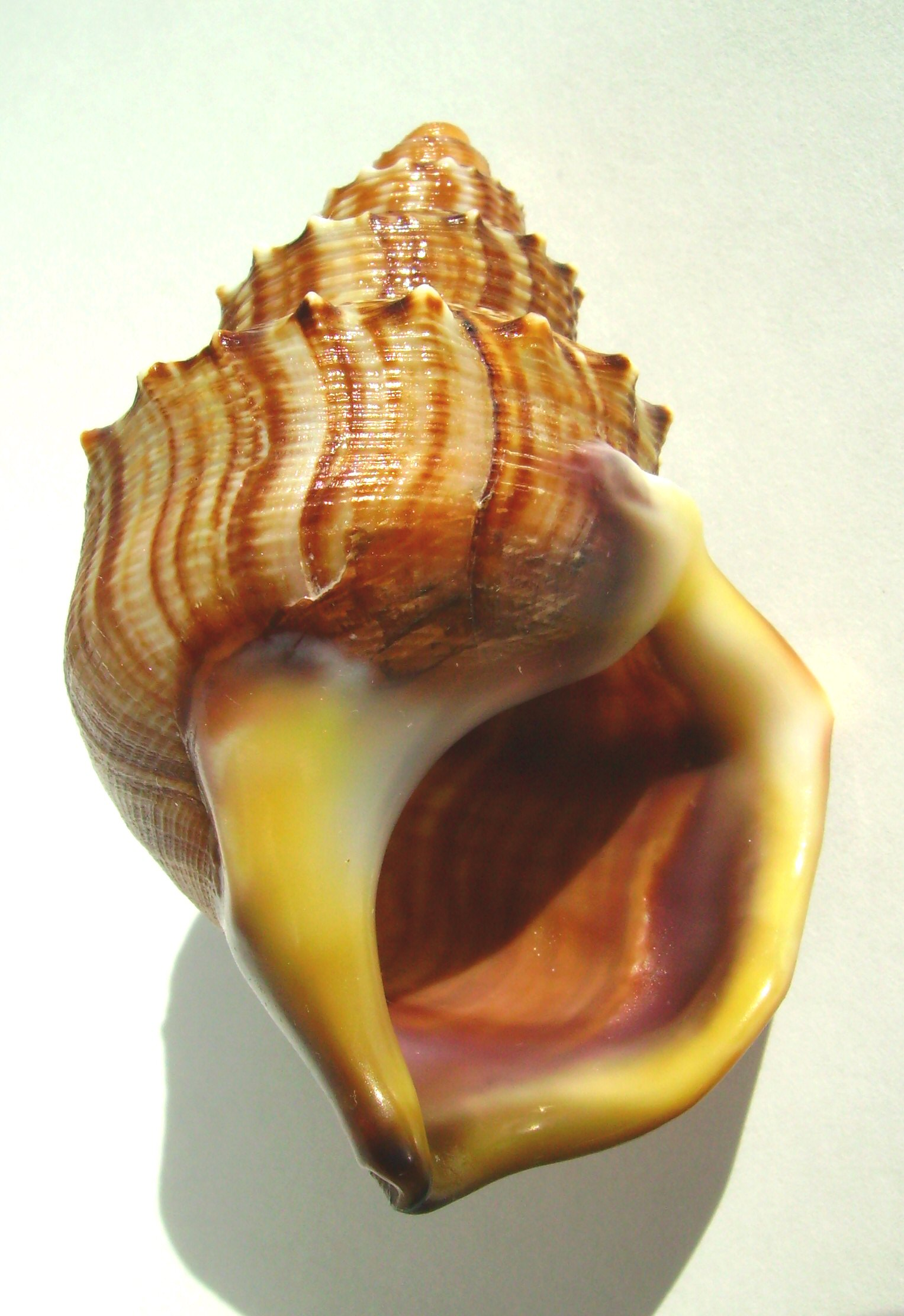
Apertural view of the same shell as above

Struthiolaria papulosa, whose common name is the ostrich foot snail or ostrich foot shell, is a species of medium-sized sea snail native to New Zealand.

== Description ==
Struthiolaria papulosa has an average body length of 77 mm, a body volume of 26.9 cm^{3} and a wet body mass of 47 g. The shell is dextrally coiled. The upper part of the shell is small and cone-shaped made of two swirls, called the protoconch. On this protoconch there are fine lines very close to each other. The opening of the shell has an oval shape with thick, turned-out and wavy lips with a thickened area at the top of the opening.

== Distribution and habitat ==
S. papulosa is native to New Zealand but can also be found in certain places along the south and east coast of Australia. In New Zealand, S. papulosa is found along the coast in both the North and South Island.

S. papulosa prefers shallow salt water or on sand flats in sheltered or open coasts.

== Life cycle ==
The life cycle of S. papulosa is divided in four stages: egg, larva, juvenile and adult. Adult S. papulosa release their sperm and eggs into the water, which can take up to 1 hour. Fertilization occurs externally, after which the fertilized egg starts developing. The egg starts forming a larval shell 9–10 hours after fertilization and, around 3 days later, the larvae grow into juvenile sea snails. S. papulosa live an average of 5 years but can live up to 25 years.

== Ecology ==
=== Diet ===
S. papulosa is a filter feeder that feeds on algae, plankton and other small marine animals. It filters suspended matter from the water with a specialized filtering structure, or uses its tooth-lined tongue to graze seaweed from the bottom of the sea.

=== Predators, parasites and diseases ===
S. papulosa has many predators including fish, birds and reptiles. The egg and larva stage are eaten by many plankton feeders but the most common S. papulosa predator is Asteroidea, especially starfish. S. papulosa protects itself from being eaten by Asteroidea by repeatedly doing somersaults.

== Ecology ==
Although the origin of this snail is unclear, it is believed that S. errata is a possible ancestor.
