= Perissodonta =

Scientific classification
- Kingdom: Animalia
- Phylum: Mollusca
- Class: Gastropoda
- Subclass: Caenogastropoda
- Order: Littorinimorpha
- Family: Struthiolariidae
- Genus: Perissodonta; Martens, 1878

Genus of gastropods

Perissodonta is a genus of sea snails, marine gastropod mollusks in the family Struthiolariidae, the ostrich-foot snails.

== Species ==
Species within the genus Perissodonta include:

- Perissodonta georgiana Strebel, 1908
- Perissodonta mirabilis (Smith, 1875)
