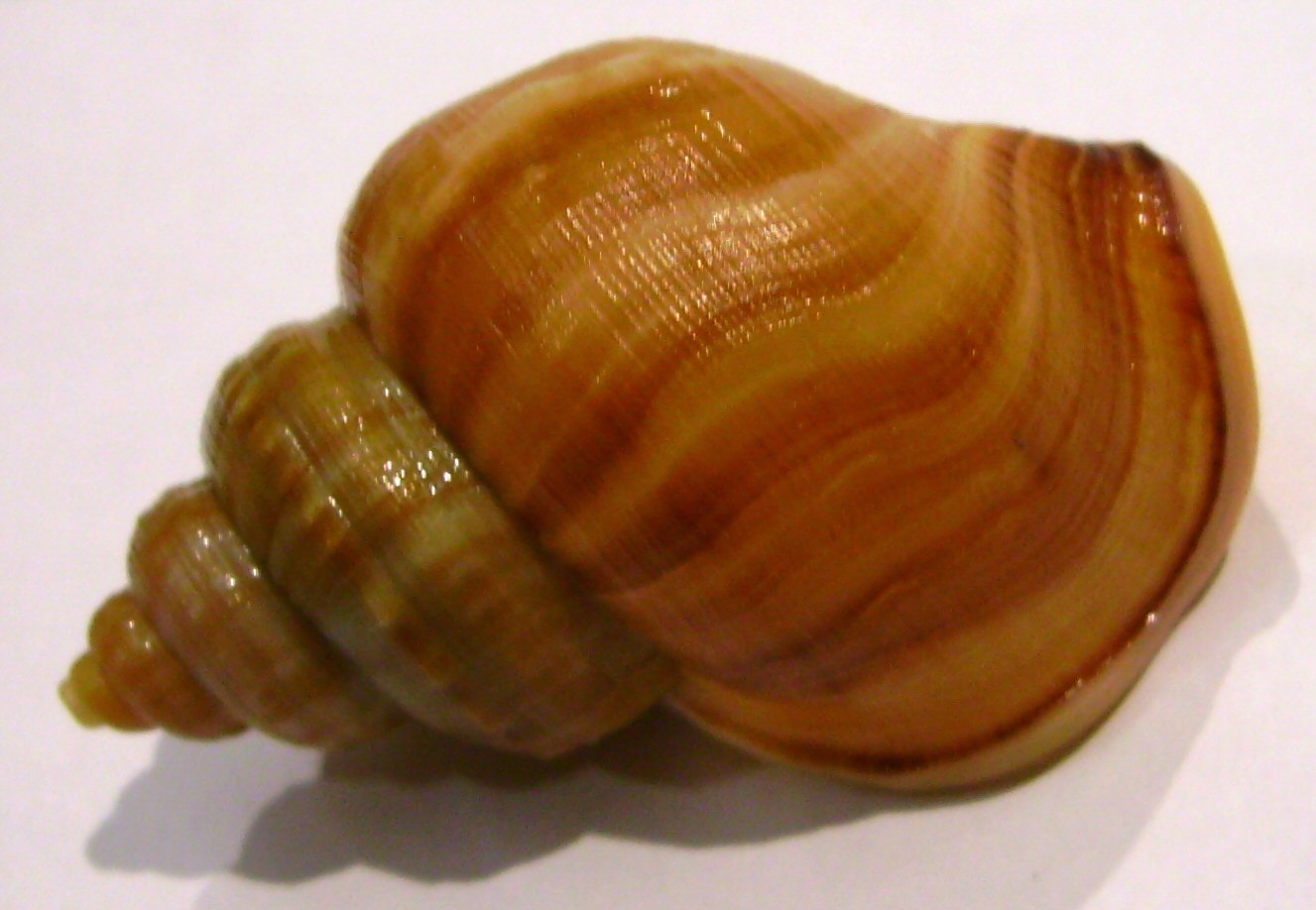
- Dorsal view of a shell of Pelicaria vermis

Scientific classification
- Kingdom: Animalia
- Phylum: Mollusca
- Class: Gastropoda
- Subclass: Caenogastropoda
- Order: Littorinimorpha
- Superfamily: Stromboidea
- Family: Struthiolariidae
- Genus: Pelicaria; Gray, 1857

Type species
- Buccinum vermis Martyn, 1784

Synonyms
- Struthiolaria (Pelicaria) Gray, 1857

= Pelicaria =

Genus of gastropods

Pelicaria is a genus of sea snail, a marine gastropod mollusc in the family Struthiolariidae.

== Species ==
- † Pelicaria arahura Beu, 2010
- † Pelicaria canaliculata (Zittel, 1864)
- † Pelicaria cestata Marwick, 1965
- † Pelicaria clarki (Neef, 1970)
- † Pelicaria granttaylori Beu, 2010
- † Pelicaria lacera (Marwick, 1931)
- † Pelicaria marima (Neef, 1970)
- † Pelicaria monilifera (Suter, 1914)
- † Pelicaria nana (Marwick, 1926)
- † Pelicaria parva (Suter, 1915)
- † Pelicaria procanalis Beu, 1970
- † Pelicaria pseudovermis (Bartrum & Powell, 1928)
- † Pelicaria rugosa (Marwick, 1924)
- Pelicaria vermis (Martyn, 1784)
- † Pelicaria zelandiae (P. Marshall & R. Murdoch, 1920)

Species brought into synonymy

- Pelicaria acuminata (Marwick, 1924): synonym of Pelicaria vermis (Martyn, 1784)
- Pelicaria convexa (Marwick, 1924): synonym of Pelicaria vermis (Martyn, 1784)
- Pelicaria fossa (Marwick, 1924): synonym of Pelicaria vermis (Martyn, 1784)
- † Pelicaria mangaoparia Vella, 1953: synonym of Pelicaria vermis (Martyn, 1784)
- † Pelicaria marwicki Finlay, 1931: synonym of † Tylospira marwicki (Finlay, 1931) (original combination)
- † Pelicaria rotunda Vella, 1953: synonym of Pelicaria vermis (Martyn, 1784)
