= Perissodonta mirabilis =

Scientific classification
- Kingdom: Animalia
- Phylum: Mollusca
- Class: Gastropoda
- Subclass: Caenogastropoda
- Order: Littorinimorpha
- Family: Struthiolariidae
- Genus: Perissodonta
- Species: P. mirabilis

Binomial name
- Perissodonta mirabilis (Smith, 1875)

Species of gastropod

Perissodonta mirabilis is a species of sea snail, a marine gastropod mollusk in the family Struthiolariidae, the ostrich-foot shells.
