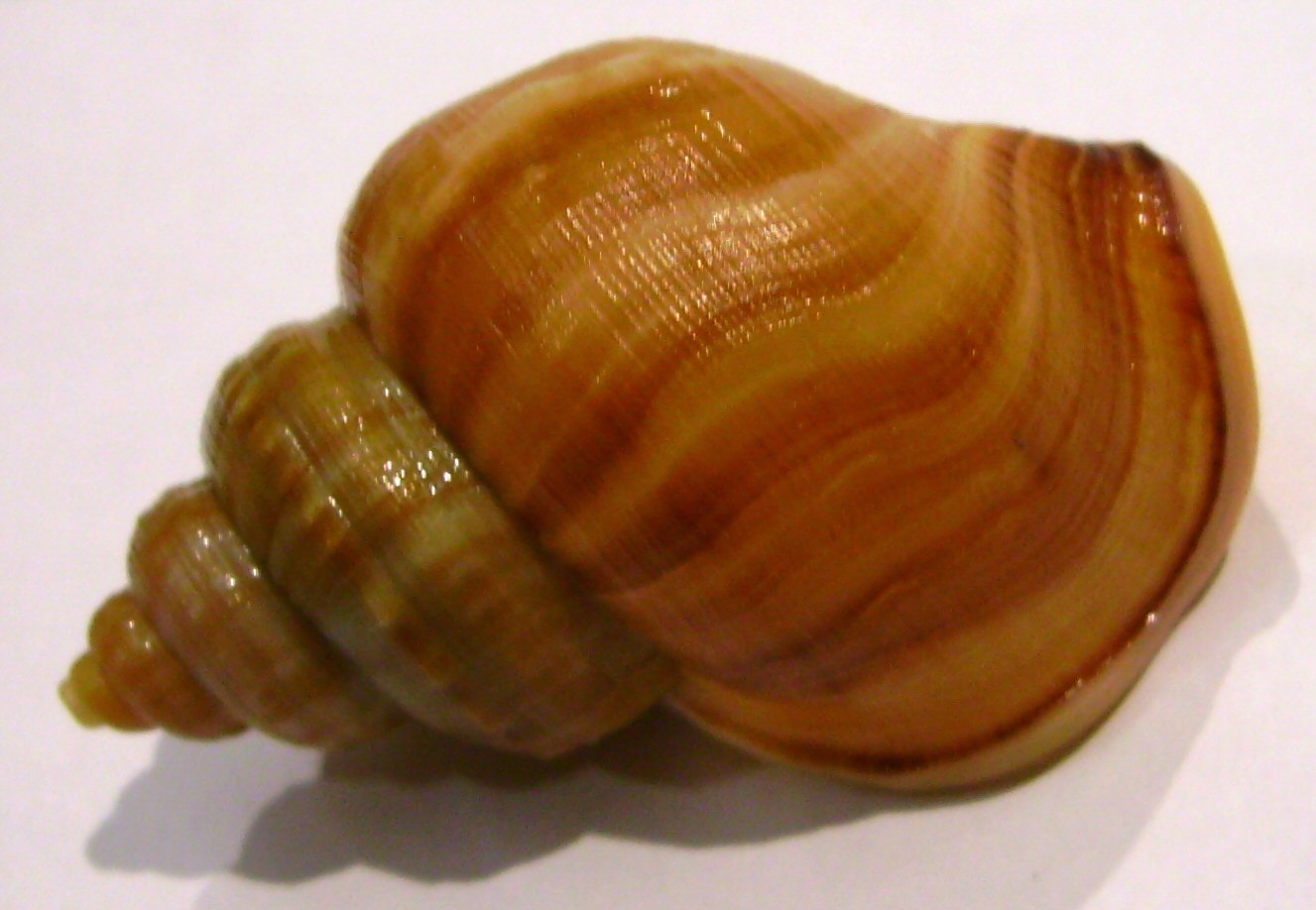
- Dorsal view of a shell of Pelicaria vermis

Scientific classification
- Kingdom: Animalia
- Phylum: Mollusca
- Class: Gastropoda
- Subclass: Caenogastropoda
- Order: Littorinimorpha
- Family: Struthiolariidae
- Genus: Pelicaria
- Species: P. vermis

Binomial name
- Pelicaria vermis (Martyn, 1784)

Synonyms
- Buccinum vermis Martyn, 1784 (basionym); Murex australis Gmelin, 1791; † Pelicaria mangaoparia Vella, 1953; † Pelicaria rotunda Vella, 1953; † Struthiolaria acuminata Marwick, 1924; † Struthiolaria convexa Marwick, 1924; Struthiolaria crenulata Lamarck, 1822; † Struthiolaria fossa Marwick, 1924; Struthiolaria inermis G.B. Sowerby I, 1821; † Struthiolaria media Marwick, 1924; Struthiolaria tricarinata Lesson, 1841; Struthiolaria vermis (Martyn, 1784); Struthiolaria vermis bradleyi Neef, 1970; Struthiolaria vermis flemingi Neef, 1970; Struthiolaria vermis grahami Neef, 1970; Struthiolaria vermis powelli Neef, 1970; Struthiolaria vermis vellai Neef, 1970; Struthiolaria vermis wellmani Neef, 1970

= Pelicaria vermis =

Species of gastropod

Pelicaria vermis, known as the small ostrich foot shell, or as takai in Māori, is a species of sea snail, a marine gastropod mollusc in the family Struthiolariidae. It is the only extant species in the genus.

== Distribution and habitat ==
This species is endemic to the North Island of New Zealand, where it lives just beneath the surface on tidal flats and off sandy beaches, occasionally to depths of 90m.

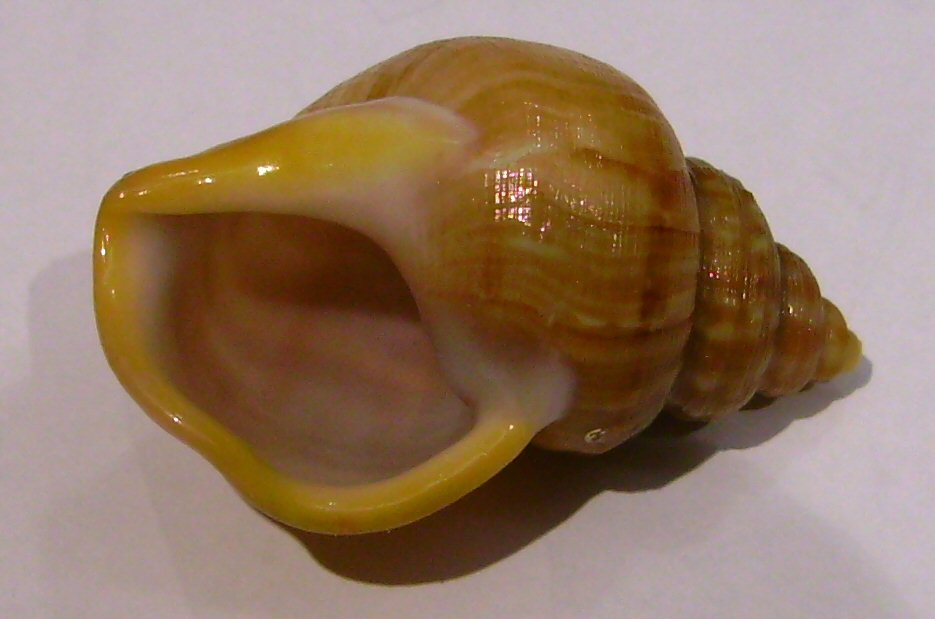
Shell of Pelicaria vermis, apertural view

== Description ==
The shell height is up to 54 mm, and width up to 35 mm, colouring usually yellow brown, rarely plain yellow or purple.
