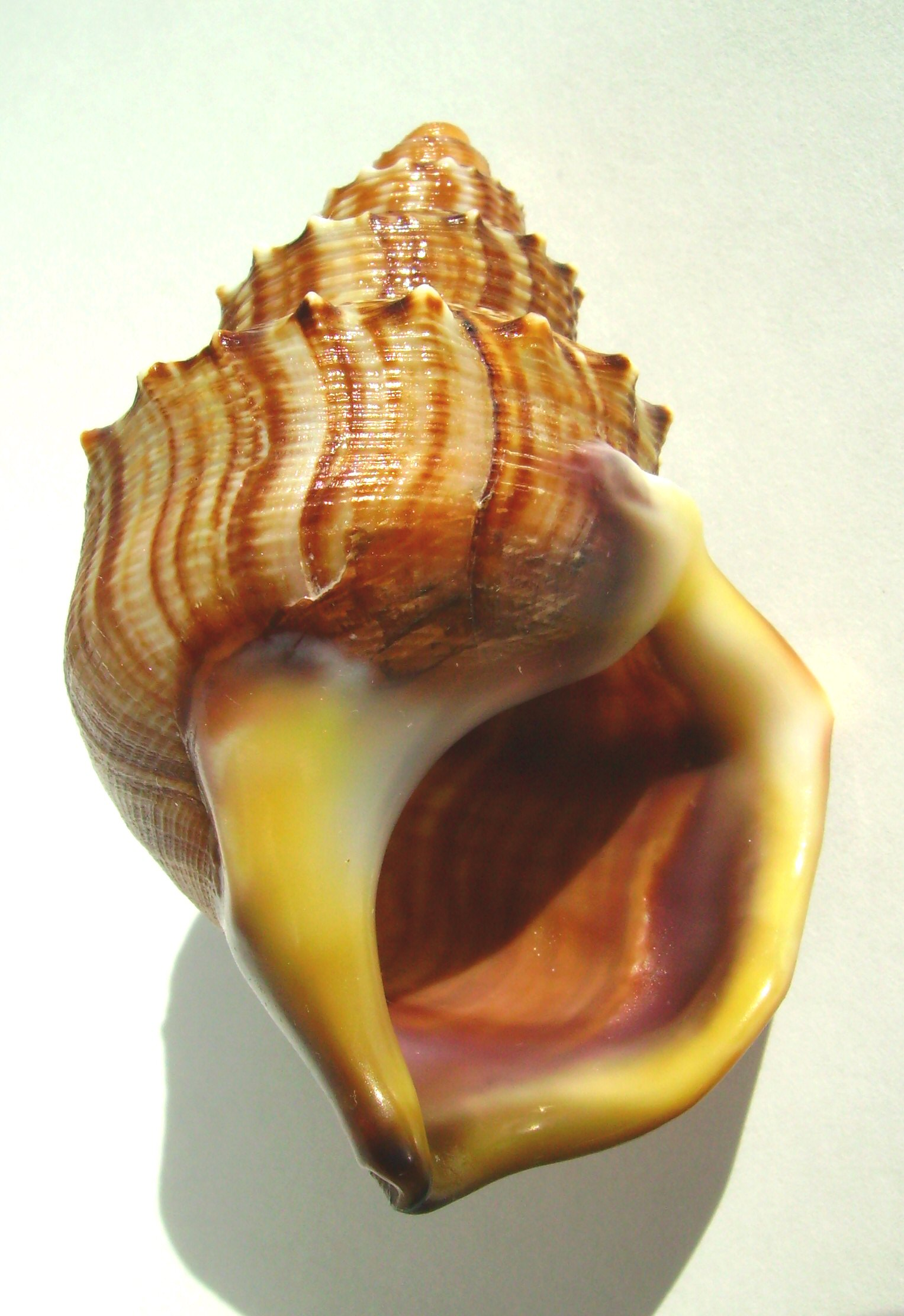
- Struthiolaria papulosa

Scientific classification
- Kingdom: Animalia
- Phylum: Mollusca
- Class: Gastropoda
- Subclass: Caenogastropoda
- Order: Littorinimorpha
- Superfamily: Stromboidea
- Family: Struthiolariidae; Gabb, 1868

Synonyms
- Struthiolariinae Gabb, 1868 (original rank)

= Struthiolariidae =

Family of gastropods

Struthiolariidae is a family of small to medium-sized sea snails, marine gastropod molluscs in the superfamily Stromboidea.

== General characteristics ==
(Original description) The animal has an outer mantle-margin that is simple. The shell is oblong-oval or turrited, with entire lips.

== Genera ==
Genera within the family Struthiolariidae include:

- Conchothyra Hutton, 1877
- † Monalaria Marwick, 1924
- Pelicaria Gray, 1857
- Perissodonta Martens, 1878
- Struthiolaria Lamarck, 1816
- Tylospira Harris, 1897

Synonyms

- † Antarctodarwinella Zinsmeister, 1976 : synonym of Perissodonta E. von Martens, 1878
- † Singletonaria Marwick, 1952: synonym of Tylospira G. F. Harris, 1897 (junior subjective synonym)
- † Struthiolarella Steinmann & Wilckens, 1908: synonym of Perissodonta E. von Martens, 1878
