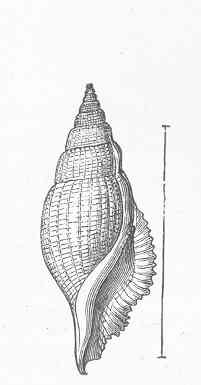
- Drawing of shell of Varicospira cancellata

Scientific classification
- Kingdom: Animalia
- Phylum: Mollusca
- Class: Gastropoda
- Subclass: Caenogastropoda
- Order: Littorinimorpha
- Family: Rimellidae
- Genus: Varicospira
- Species: V. cancellata

Binomial name
- Varicospira cancellata (Lamarck, 1816)

Synonyms
- Rimella cancellata (Lamarck, 1816); Rostellaria fisurella Linnaeus, C. 1767 (nomen dubium); Strombus cancellatus Lamarck, 1816 (original combination); Varicospira lee Iredale, 1958

= Varicospira cancellata =

Species of gastropod

Varicospira cancellata, common name the cancellated beak shell, is a species of sea snail, a marine gastropod mollusk in the family Rimellidae, the true conchs.

== Description ==
the length of the shell attains 36 mm.

(Described as Rimella cancellata) The whorls are cancellated, occasionally varicose. The siphonal canal is produced upon the spire, which it ascends in a curved line. The interior of the outer lip is dentate. The color of the shell is pale yellowish brown, indistinctly banded with pale chestnut.

== Distribution ==
This marine species occurs in the Indo-West Pacific; also off India, in the Andaman Sea, Thailand and Myanmar, the Philippines, Indonesia; off Taiwan, the China Seas, Solomon Islands, off Papua New Guinea and Australia (Queensland, Western Australia)
