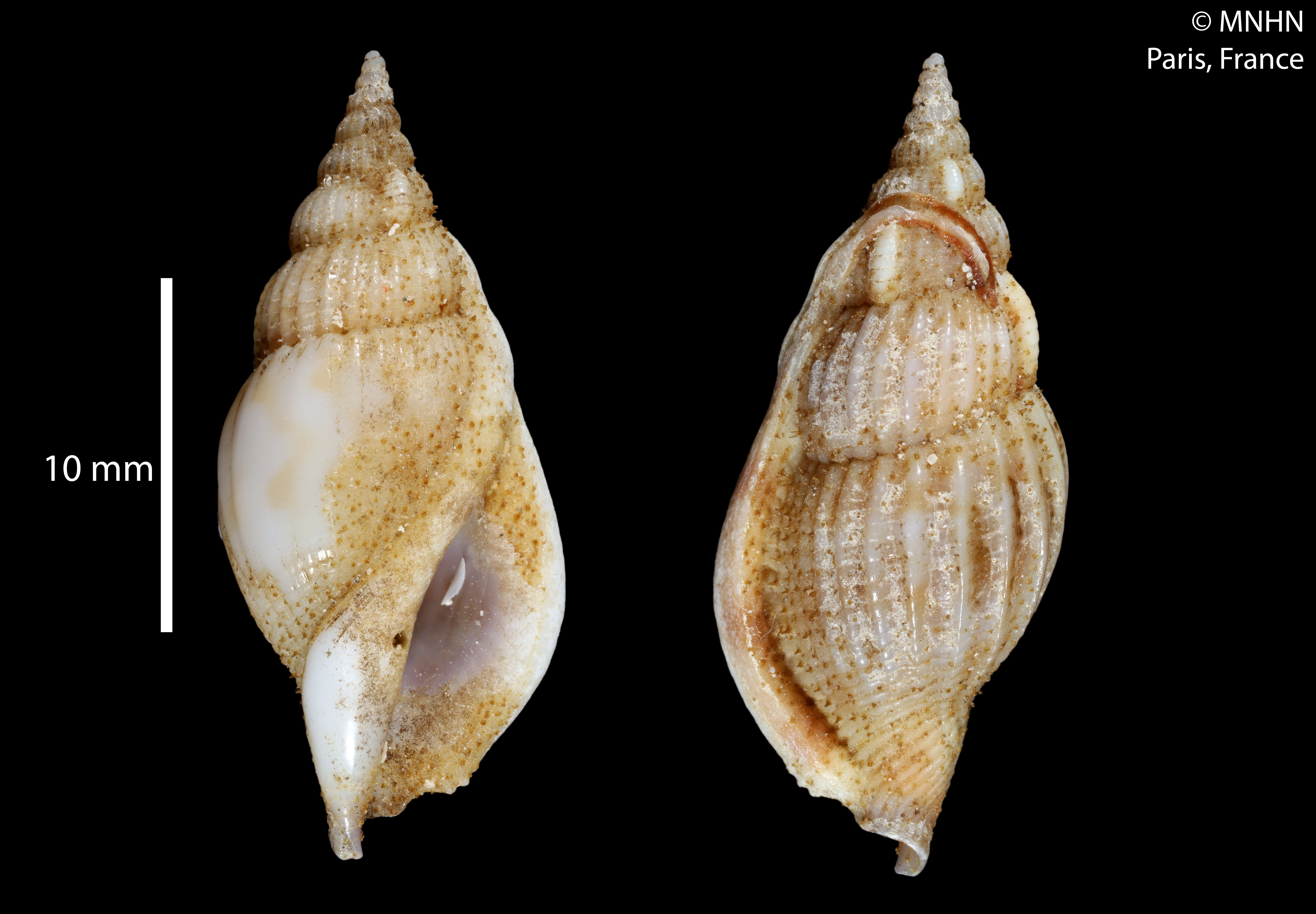

Scientific classification
- Kingdom: Animalia
- Phylum: Mollusca
- Class: Gastropoda
- Subclass: Caenogastropoda
- Order: Littorinimorpha
- Family: Rimellidae
- Genus: Varicospira
- Species: V. kooli

Binomial name
- Varicospira kooli Moolenbeek & Dekker, 2007

= Varicospira kooli =

Species of gastropod

Varicospira kooli is a species of sea snail, a marine gastropod mollusk in the family Rimellidae, the true conchs.

== Distribution ==
This marine species occurs off Thailand and Myanmar.
