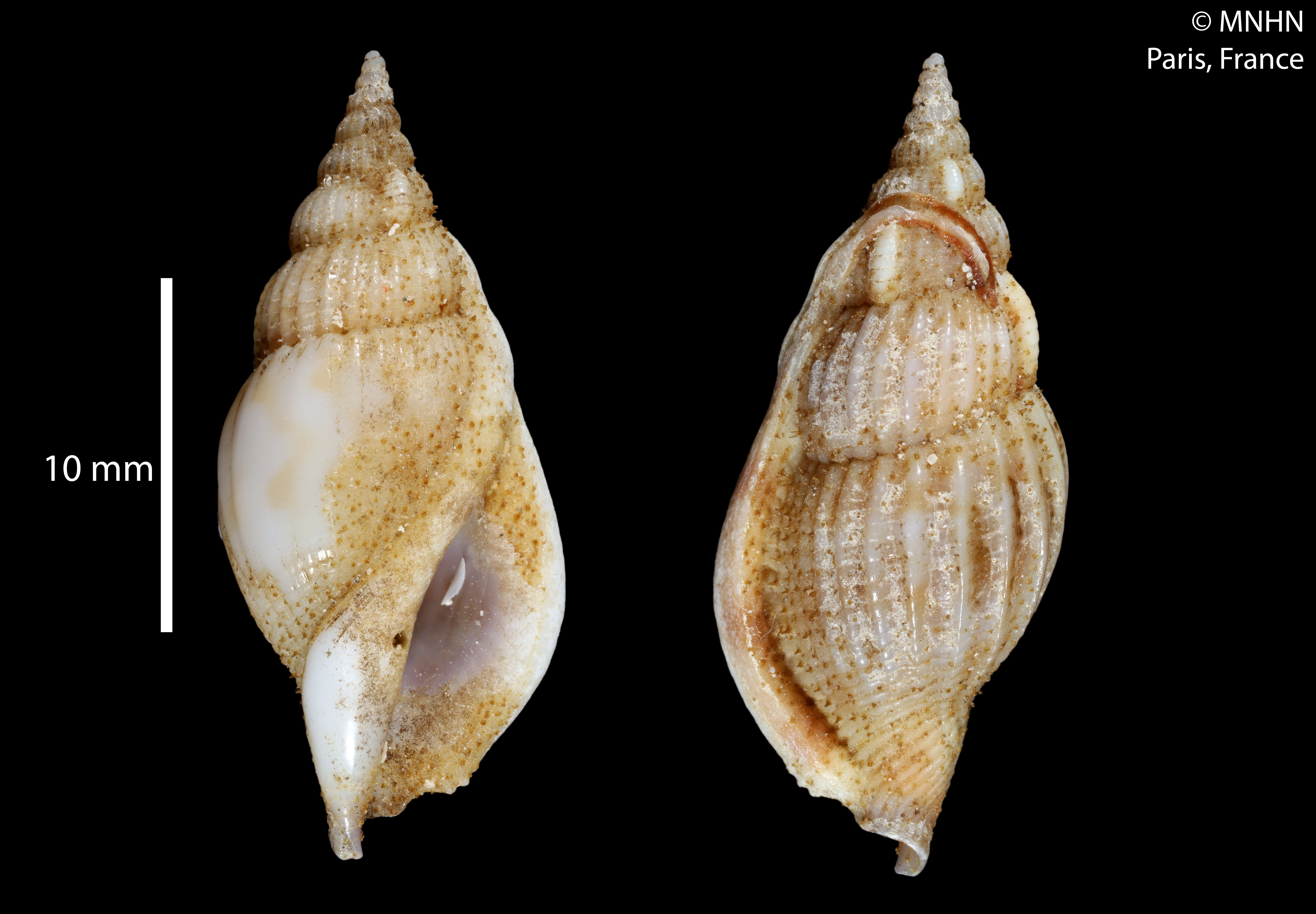
- Varicospira kooli

Scientific classification
- Kingdom: Animalia
- Phylum: Mollusca
- Class: Gastropoda
- Subclass: Caenogastropoda
- Order: Littorinimorpha
- Superfamily: Stromboidea
- Family: Rimellidae
- Genus: Varicospira; Eames, 1952

Type species
- Strombus cancellatus Lamarck, 1816

= Varicospira =

Genus of gastropods

Varicospira is a genus of sea snails, marine gastropod mollusks in the family Rimellidae within the Stromboidea, the true conchs and their allies.

== Distribution ==
Species of this genus occur in the Central Indo-west Pacific and off Australia (Queensland, Western Australia)

== Species ==
Species within the genus Varicospira include:

- Varicospira bekenuensis Raven, 2021
- Varicospira cancellata (Lamarck, 1816)
- Varicospira crispata (G. B. Sowerby II, 1842)
- † Varicospira decussata (J.L.M. Defrance in B. de Basterot, 1825 )
- † Varicospira integra (A. von Koenen, 1889)
- Varicospira javana (K.Martin, 1879)
- Varicospira kooli Moolenbeek & Dekker, 2007
- Varicospira longirostra (Pannekoek, 1936)
- Varicospira marjae Dekkers, 2026
- Varicospira mordax (K.Martin, 1916)
- † Varicospira rakhiensis (F.E. Eames, 1952)
- Varicospira reticulata Raven, 2021
- † Varicospira sokkohensis (K. Martin, 1916)
- † Varicospira spinifera (Martin, 1899)
- † Varicospira tenuiincisus (F.E. Eames, 1952)
- † Varicospira toyamaensis (K. Tsuda, 1959
- Varicospira tyleri (H. Adams & A. Adams, 1864)
- Varicospira zuschini Harzhauser, 2007

Species brought into synonymy

- Varicospira formosana (M. Yokoyama, 1928) (synonym of † Rostellaria (Rimella) spinifera var. formosana Yokoyama, 1928 (uncertain > unassessed)
- † Varicospira gerthi (A. Pannekoek, 1936) : synonym of † Dientomochilus gerthi (Pannekoek, 1936)
- Varicospira lee Iredale, 1958: synonym of Varicospira cancellata (Lamarck, 1816) (nomen dubium)
- † Varicospira martini (A. Pannekoek, 1936) : synonym of † Dientomochilus martini (Pannekoek, 1936)
- † Varicospira narica (E.W. Vredenburg, 1925 ) : synonym of † Rimella subrimosa var. narica Vredenburg, 1925
- † Varicospira rembangensis (A. Pannekoek, 1936): synonym of † Dientomochilus rembangensis (Pannekoek, 1936)
- † Varicospira semicancellata (Martin, 1899): synonym of † Rimella semicancellata (K. Martin, 1899)
- † Varicospira sindiensis (E.W. Vredenburg, 1925): synonym of † Rostellaria sindiensis Vredenburg, 1925
- Varicospira speciosa (H. Adams & A. Adams, 1864) (nomen dubium)
- † Varicospira subrimosa (A.V.M.D. D'Orbigny, 1852): synonym of † Rimella subrimosa (d'Orbigny, 1847)
