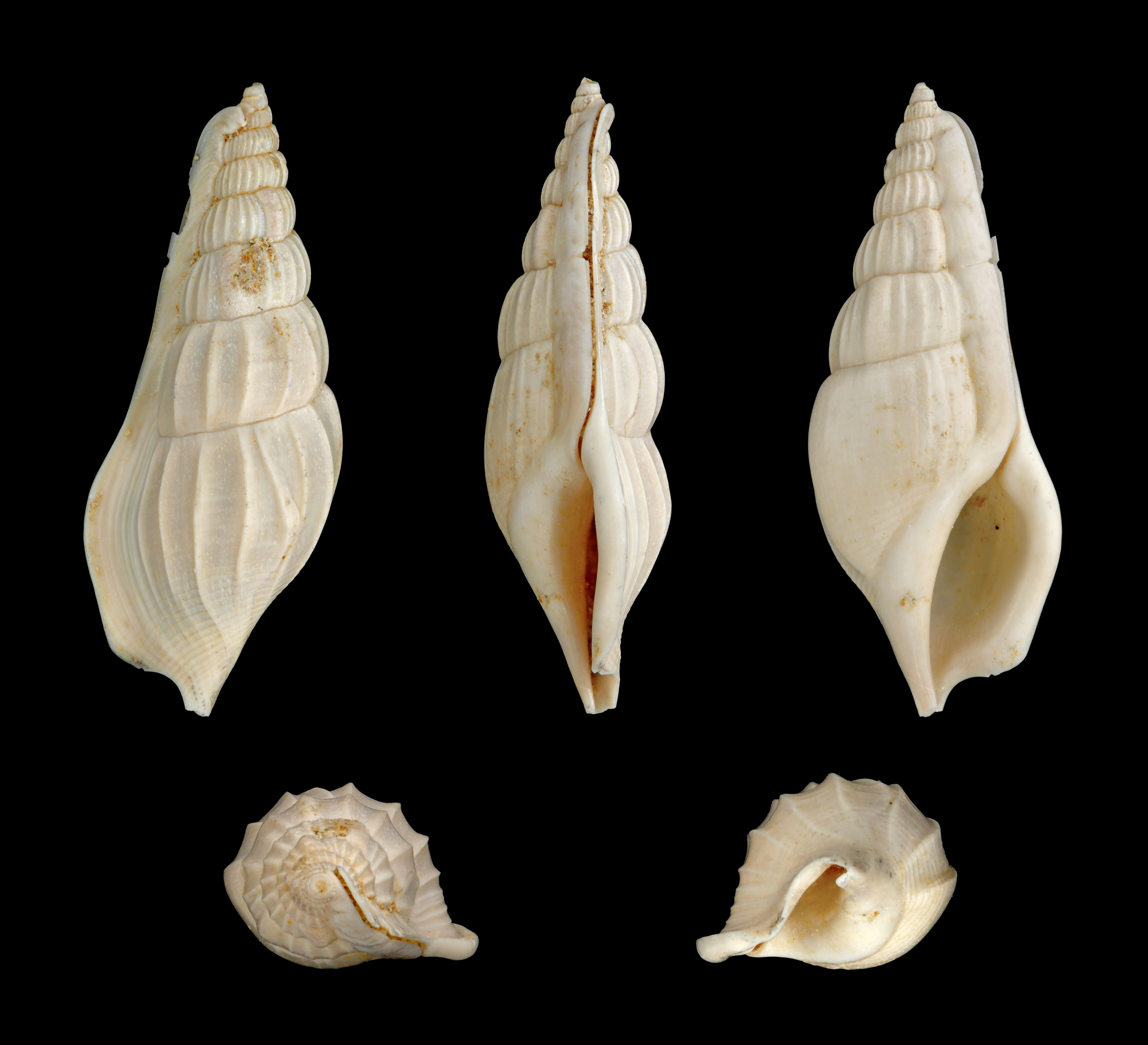

Scientific classification
- Kingdom: Animalia
- Phylum: Mollusca
- Class: Gastropoda
- Subclass: Caenogastropoda
- Order: Littorinimorpha
- Family: Rostellariidae
- Genus: †Rimella
- Species: †R. fissurella

Binomial name
- †Rimella fissurella (Linnaeus, 1767)

Synonyms
- Strombus fissurella

= Rimella fissurella =

Rimella fissurella Temporal range: Paleocene - Oligocene

Extinct species of gastropod

Rimella fissurella is an extinct species of fossil sea snail, a marine gastropod mollusk in the family Strombidae, the true conchs. This species is found from the Paleocene to the Oligocene of Europe.
