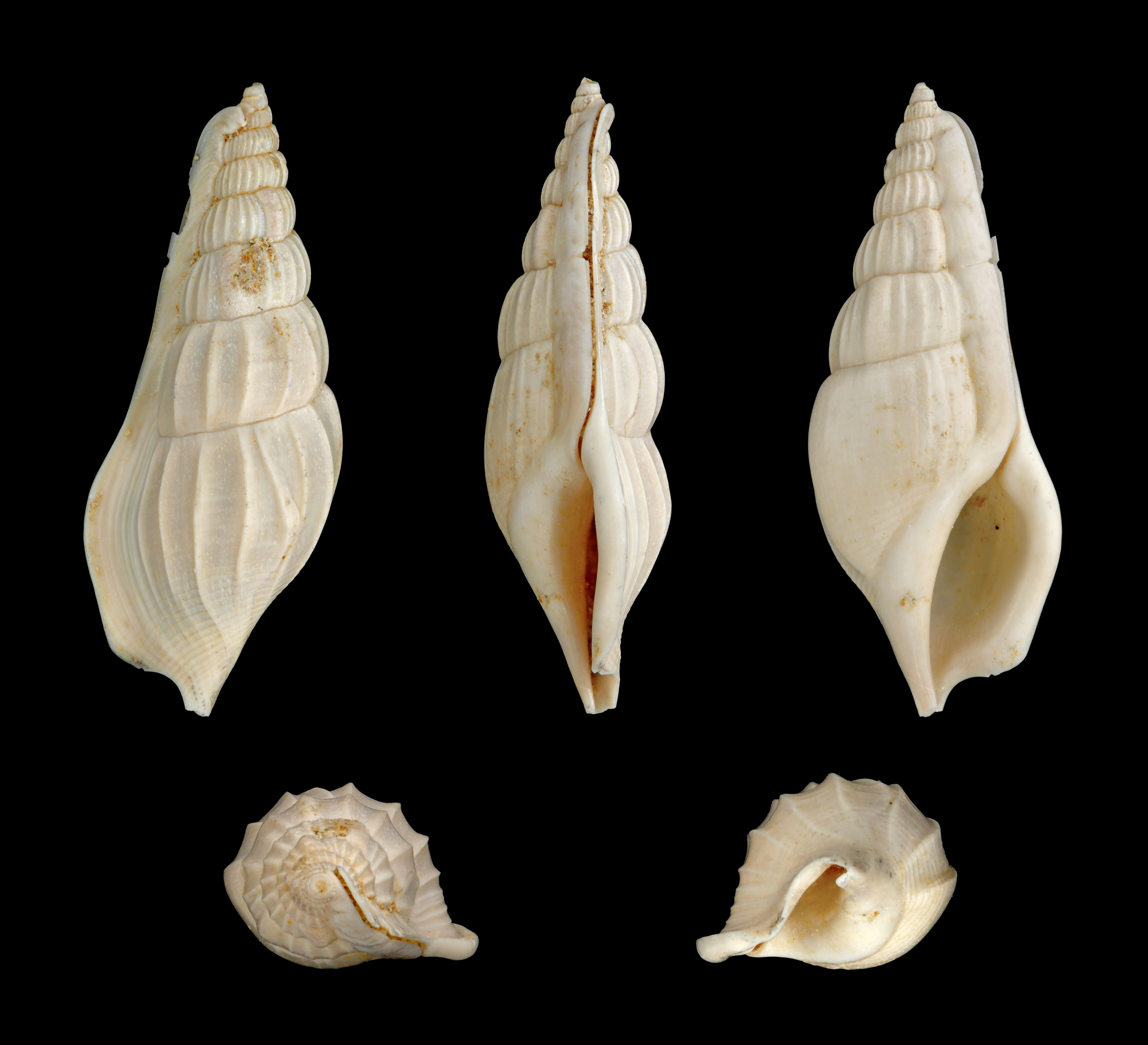

Scientific classification
- Kingdom: Animalia
- Phylum: Mollusca
- Class: Gastropoda
- Subclass: Caenogastropoda
- Order: Littorinimorpha
- Family: Rostellariidae
- Genus: †Rimella; Agassiz, 1841

Type species
- † Strombus fissurella Linnaeus, 1758

= Rimella (gastropod) =

Rimella Temporal range: Paleocene - Oligocene

Genus of gastropods

Rimella is a genus of fossil sea snails, marine gastropod molluscs in the family Rimellidae within the Stromboidea, the true conchs and their allies.

Species in this genus are extinct and were found from the Paleocene to the Oligocene of Europe.

== Species ==
Species within the genus Rimella include:

- † Rimella cazesi Pacaud & Pons, 2015
- † Rimella duplicicosta Cossmann, 1901
- † Rimella fissurella (Linnaeus, 1758)
- † Rimella gomezi Pacaud & Pons, 2015
- † Rimella gracilis Ma & Zhang, 1996
- † Rimella labrosa (G. B. Sowerby I, 1823)
- † Rimella mexcala Kiel & Perrilliat, 2001
- † Rimella obesa Cuvillier, 1935
- † Rimella rimosa (Solander, 1766)
- † Rimella rokeyae Banerjee & Halder, 2024
- † Rimella sandrinae Pacaud & Pons, 2015

Species brought into synonymy

- Rimella tyleri H. Adams & A. Adams, 1864: synonym of Varicospira tyleri (H. Adams & A. Adams, 1864)
