= Rimellidae =

Scientific classification
- Kingdom: Animalia
- Phylum: Mollusca
- Class: Gastropoda
- Subclass: Caenogastropoda
- Order: Littorinimorpha
- Superfamily: Stromboidea
- Family: Rimellidae; R. B. Stewart, 1927

Type genus
- † Rimella Agassiz, 1841

Synonyms
- Rimellinae R. B. Stewart, 1927 superseded rank

Family of molluscs

Rimellidae is a family of sea snails, marine gastropod molluscs in the clade Littorinimorpha.

== Genera ==
- † Dientomochilus Cossmann, 1904
- † Ectinochilus Cossmann, 1889
- † Rimella Agassiz, 1841
- † Strombolaria De Gregorio, 1880
- Varicospira Eames, 1952
