= Distorsio graceiellae =

Scientific classification
- Kingdom: Animalia
- Phylum: Mollusca
- Class: Gastropoda
- Subclass: Caenogastropoda
- Order: Littorinimorpha
- Superfamily: Tonnoidea
- Family: Personidae
- Genus: Distorsio
- Species: D. graceiellae

Binomial name
- Distorsio graceiellae Parth, 1989

Species of gastropod

Distorsio graceiellae is a species of medium-sized sea snail, a marine gastropod mollusk in the family Personidae, the Distortio snails.

== Description ==
The length of the shell attains 30 mm.

== Distribution ==
This marine species occurs off the Philippines, Indonesia, Vanuatu, the Fiji Islands, the Solomon Islands, the Loyalty Islands and New Caledonia and Australia (New South Wales, Queensland)
