= Distorsio burgessi =

Scientific classification
- Kingdom: Animalia
- Phylum: Mollusca
- Class: Gastropoda
- Subclass: Caenogastropoda
- Order: Littorinimorpha
- Superfamily: Tonnoidea
- Family: Personidae
- Genus: Distorsio
- Species: D. burgessi

Binomial name
- Distorsio burgessi Lewis, 1972

Species of gastropod

Distorsio burgessi is a species of medium-sized sea snail, a marine gastropod mollusk in the family Personidae, the Distortio snails.

== Description ==
The length of the shell attains 70 mm.

== Distribution ==
This marine species occurs off Hawaii.
