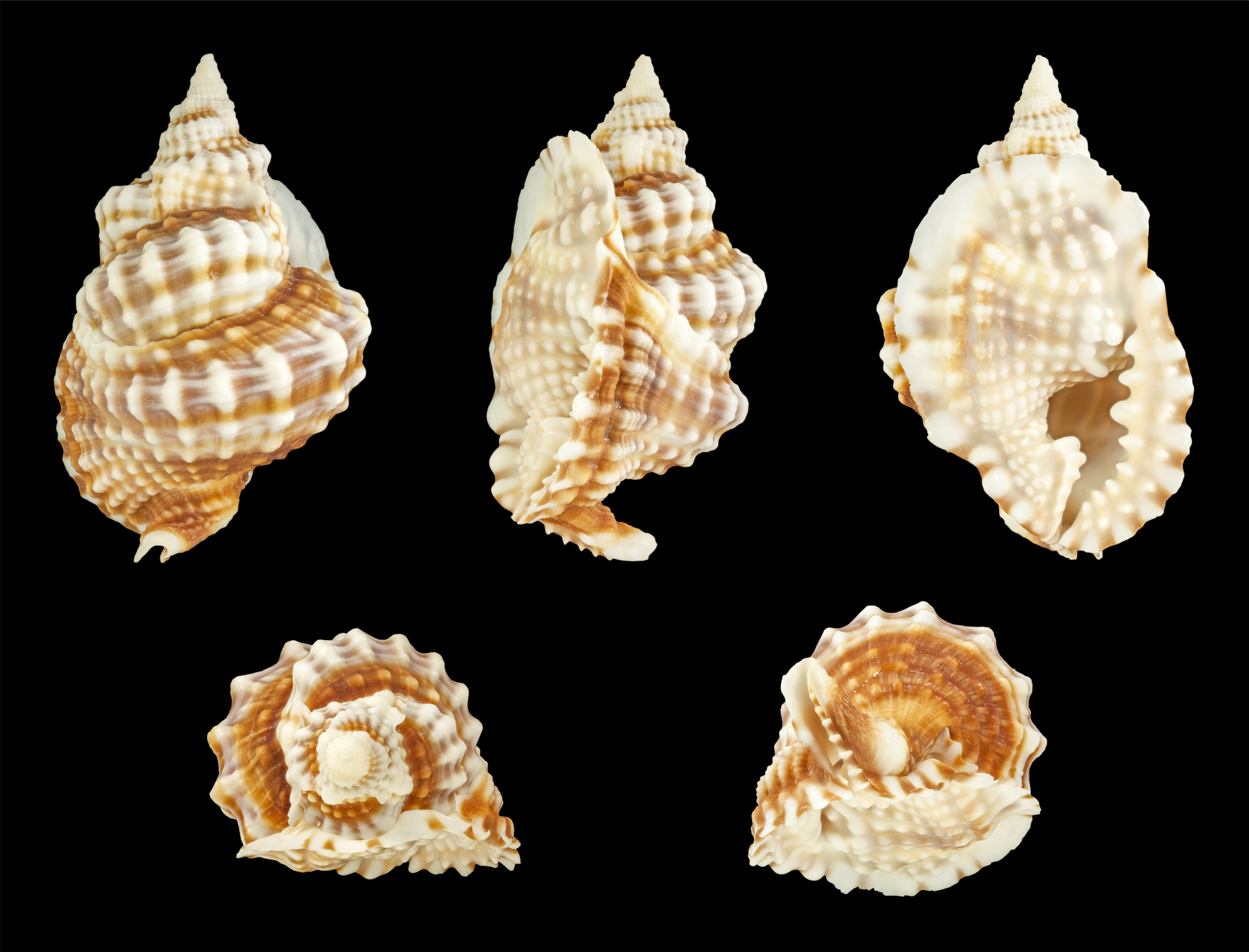
- Five views of a shell of Distorsio anus (Linnaeus, 1758)

Scientific classification
- Kingdom: Animalia
- Phylum: Mollusca
- Class: Gastropoda
- Subclass: Caenogastropoda
- Order: Littorinimorpha
- Superfamily: Tonnoidea
- Family: Personidae
- Genus: Distorsio
- Species: D. anus

Binomial name
- Distorsio anus (Linnaeus, 1758)

Synonyms
- Distorta rotunda Perry, 1811; Distorta rugosa Schumacher, 1817; Distortrix anus (Linnaeus, 1758); Murex anus Linnaeus, 1758

= Distorsio anus =

Species of gastropod

Distorsio anus, common name the common distorsio, is a species of medium-sized sea snail, a marine gastropod mollusk in the family Personidae, the Distortio snails.

The Distorsio anus is a marine gastropod found in tropical and subtropical waters, typically inhabiting sandy or rocky seabeds at moderate depths. As a member of the Tonnoidea superfamily, it is often associated with coral reef environments and other hard-bottom habitats where it can find shelter and food. D. anus is not widely exploited, but its uniquely ridged and textured shell makes it of interest to shell collectors. Some species within the Distorsio genus have also been used in the ornamental shell trade. While it does not have significant commercial or medicinal applications, its ecological role as a predator or scavenger within marine ecosystems helps maintain the balance of benthic communities.

== Description ==
The size of the shell varies between 33 mm and 100 mm.

== Distribution ==
This marine species occurs in the Red Sea and in the Indo-Pacific (Tanzania, Madagascar, the Mascarene Basin, Mauritius)
