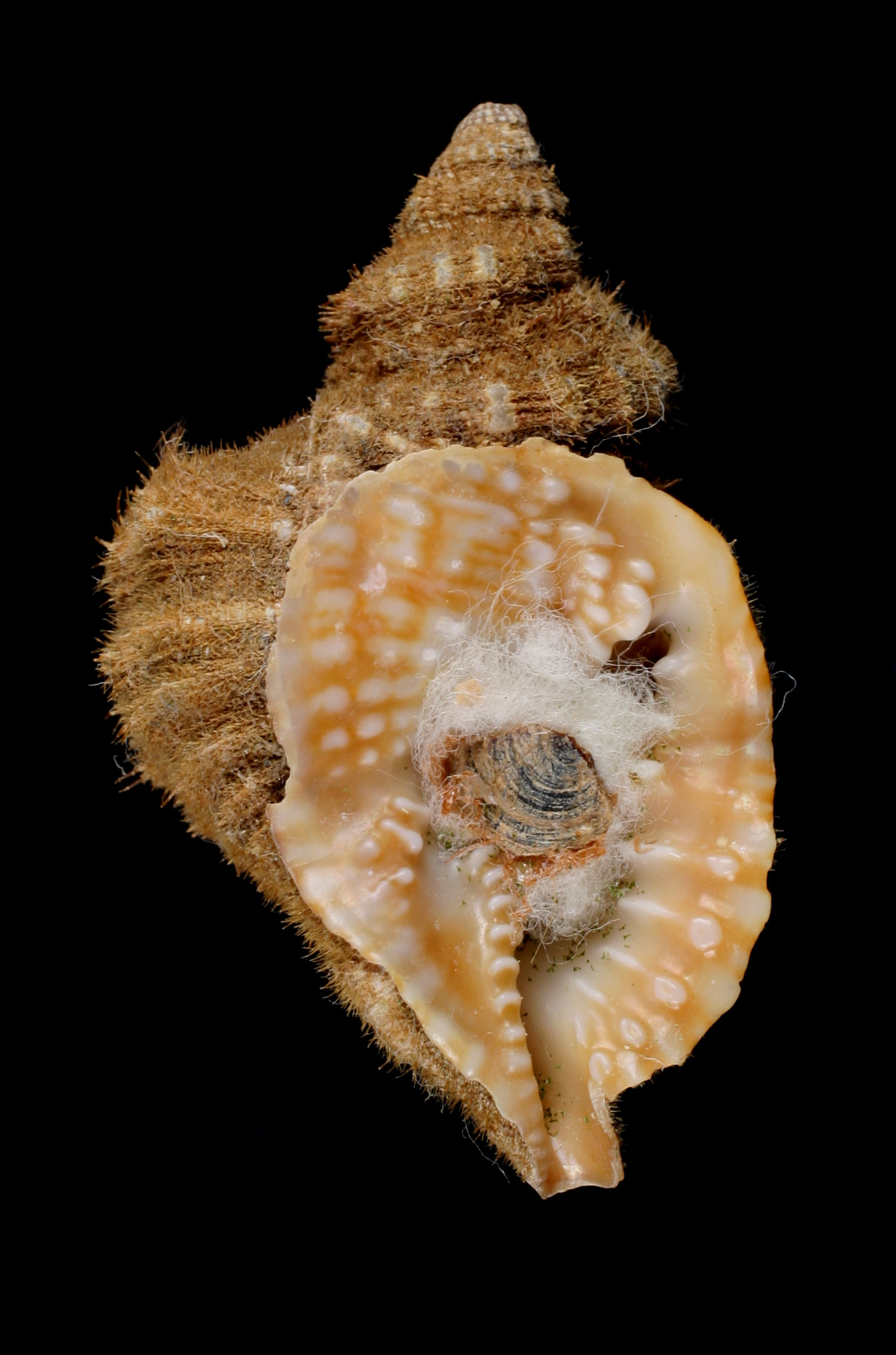
- Apertural view of Distorsio constricta (Broderip, 1833) with operculum and periostracum

Scientific classification
- Kingdom: Animalia
- Phylum: Mollusca
- Class: Gastropoda
- Subclass: Caenogastropoda
- Order: Littorinimorpha
- Superfamily: Tonnoidea
- Family: Personidae
- Genus: Distorsio
- Species: D. constricta

Binomial name
- Distorsio constricta (Broderip, 1833)

Synonyms
- Triton constricta Broderip, 1833

= Distorsio constricta =

Species of gastropod

Distorsio constricta is a species of medium-sized sea snail, a marine gastropod mollusk in the family Personidae, the Distortio snails.

== Subspecies ==
- Distorsio constricta constricta (Broderip, 1833)
- Distorsio constricta mcgintyi Emerson & Puffer, 1953: synonym of Distorsio mcgintyi Emerson & Puffer, 1953

== Distribution ==
This marine species occurs in the Pacific Ocean from Mexico to Ecuador.

== Description ==
The maximum recorded shell length of Distorsio constricta mcgintyi is 65 mm.

== Habitat ==
Minimum recorded depth of Distorsio constricta mcgintyi is 25 m. Maximum recorded depth is 274 m.
