= Distorsio ridens =

Scientific classification
- Kingdom: Animalia
- Phylum: Mollusca
- Class: Gastropoda
- Subclass: Caenogastropoda
- Order: Littorinimorpha
- Superfamily: Tonnoidea
- Family: Personidae
- Genus: Distorsio
- Species: D. ridens

Binomial name
- Distorsio ridens (Reeve, 1844)

Synonyms
- Distorsio (Distorsio) jenniernestae Emerson & Piech, 1992; Distorsio jenniernestae Emerson & Piech, 1992; Triton ridens Reeve, 1844 (original combination)

Species of gastropod

Distorsio ridens is a species of medium-sized sea snail, a marine gastropod mollusk in the family Personidae, the Distortio snails.

== Description ==
The length of the shell attains 88 mm.

== Distribution ==
This marine species occurs in the Caribbean Sea.
