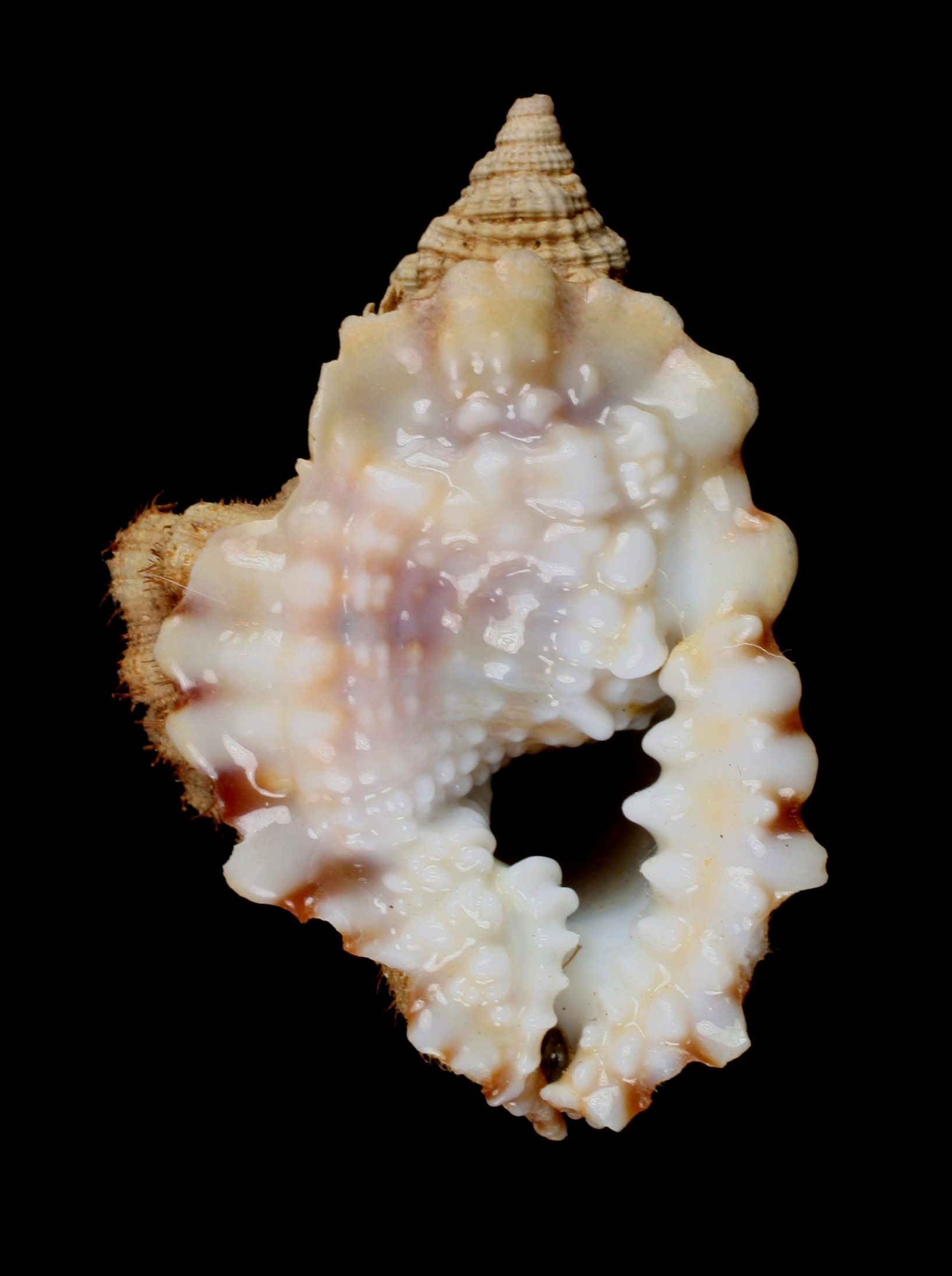
- Apertural view of a shell of Distorsio anus (Linnaeus, 1758)
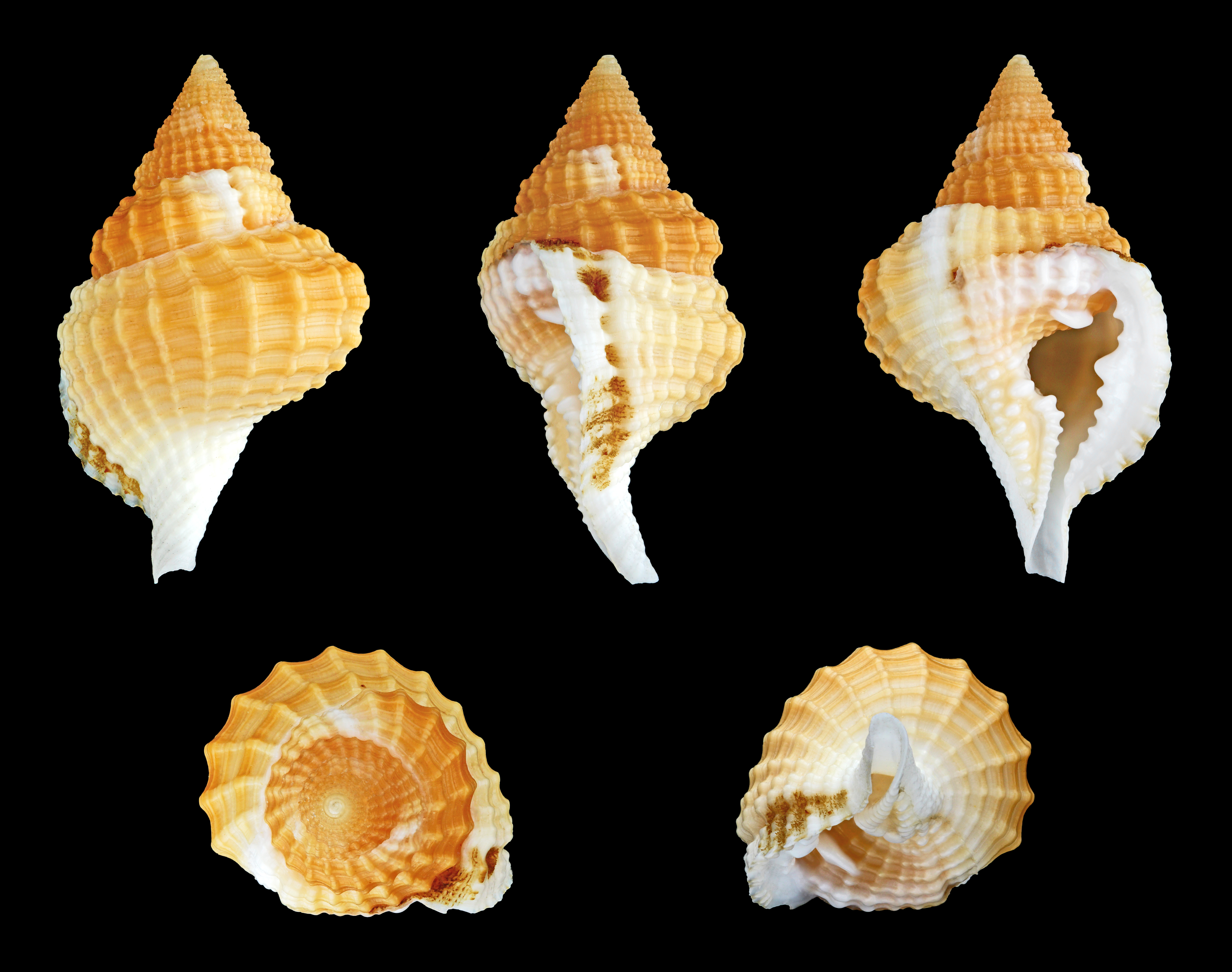
- Five views of a shell of Distorsio decipiens

Scientific classification
- Kingdom: Animalia
- Phylum: Mollusca
- Class: Gastropoda
- Subclass: Caenogastropoda
- Order: Littorinimorpha
- Superfamily: Tonnoidea
- Family: Personidae
- Genus: Distorsio; Bolten, 1798

Type species
- Murex anus Linnaeus, 1758

Synonyms
- Calcarella Souleyet, 1850; Distorsio (Distorsio) Röding, 1798; Distorsio (Rhysema) Clench & Turner, 1957; Distorta Perry, 1811; Distortrix Link, 1807; Persona Montfort, 1810

= Distorsio =

Genus of gastropods

Distorsio is a genus of medium-sized sea snails, marine gastropod mollusks in the family Personidae, the Distortio snails.

== Description ==
The shell is subturreted. The whorls are distorted. The aperture is irregular, contracted and ringent. The siphonal canal is recurved. The inner lip is dilated lamellar and rugosely indented. The columella is excavated and verrucosely plicate. The outer lip is sinuous and internally plicato-dentate.

== Species ==
Species within the genus Distorsio include:

- Distorsio anus (Linnaeus, 1758)
- † Distorsio biangulata Beu, 2010
- Distorsio burgessi Lewis, 1972
- † Distorsio cancellina (Lamarck, 1803)
- Distorsio clathrata (Lamarck, 1816)
- Distorsio constricta (Broderip, 1833)
- Distorsio decussata (Valenciennes, 1832)
- † Distorsio djunggranganensis (K. Martin, 1916)
- Distorsio euconstricta Beu, 1987
- † Distorsio floridana (J. Gardner, 1947) †
- Distorsio globosa Nolf, 2014
- Distorsio graceiellae Parth, 1989
- Distorsio habei Lewis, 1972
- Distorsio kurzi Petuch & Harasewych, 1980
- Distorsio mcgintyi Emerson & Puffer, 1953
- † Distorsio metableta (Cossmann, 1903)
- Distorsio micalii T. Cossignani, 2023
- Distorsio minoruohnishii Parth, 1989
- Distorsio muehlhaeusseri Parth, 1990
- Distorsio parvimpedita Beu, 1998
- Distorsio perdistorta Fulton, 1938
- Distorsio reticularis (Linnaeus, 1758)
- Distorsio ridens (Reeve, 1844)
- † Distorsio ringens (R. A. Philippi, 1887)
- † Distorsio simillima (G. B. Sowerby I, 1850)
- Distorsio smithi (von Maltzan, 1884)
- Distorsio somalica Parth, 1990

Species which are synonyms or were incorrectly placed in the genus Distorsio:

- Distorsio acuta Perry, 1811: synonym of Distorsio reticularis (Linnaeus, 1758)
- Distorsio arcularia Röding, 1798: synonym of Nassarius arcularia arcularia (Linnaeus, 1758)
- Distorsio communis Röding, 1798: synonym of Nassarius stolatus (Gmelin, 1791)
- Distorsio decipiens (Reeve, 1844): synonym of Distorsio reticularis (Linnaeus, 1758)
- Distorsio francesae Iredale, 1931: synonym of Distorsio reticularis (Linnaeus, 1758)
- Distorsio horrida Kuroda & Habe in Habe, 1961: synonym of Distorsio perdistorta Fulton, 1938
- Distorsio jenniernestae Emerson & Piech, 1992: synonym of Distorsio ridens (Reeve, 1844)
- Distorsio lewisi Beu, 1978: synonym of Distorsionella lewisi (Beu, 1978)
- Distorsio mcgintyi Emerson & Puffer, 1953: synonym of Distorsio constricta mcgintyi Emerson & Puffer, 1953
- Distorsio muricina Röding, 1798: synonym of Gutturnium muricinum (Röding, 1798)
- Distorsio plicata Röding, 1798: synonym of Nassarius arcularia plicatus (Röding, 1798)
- Distorsio pusilla Pease, 1861: synonym of Distorsomina pusilla (Pease, 1861)
- Distorsio reticulata Röding, 1798: synonym of Distorsio reticularis (Linnaeus, 1758)
- Distorsio robinsoni Petuch, 1987: synonym of Distorsio clathrata (Lamarck, 1816)
- † Distorsio septemdentata Gabb, 1860: synonym of † Personopsis septemdentata (Gabb, 1860)
- Distorsio ventricosa Kronenberg, 1994: synonym of Distorsio muehlhaeusseri Parth, 1990
