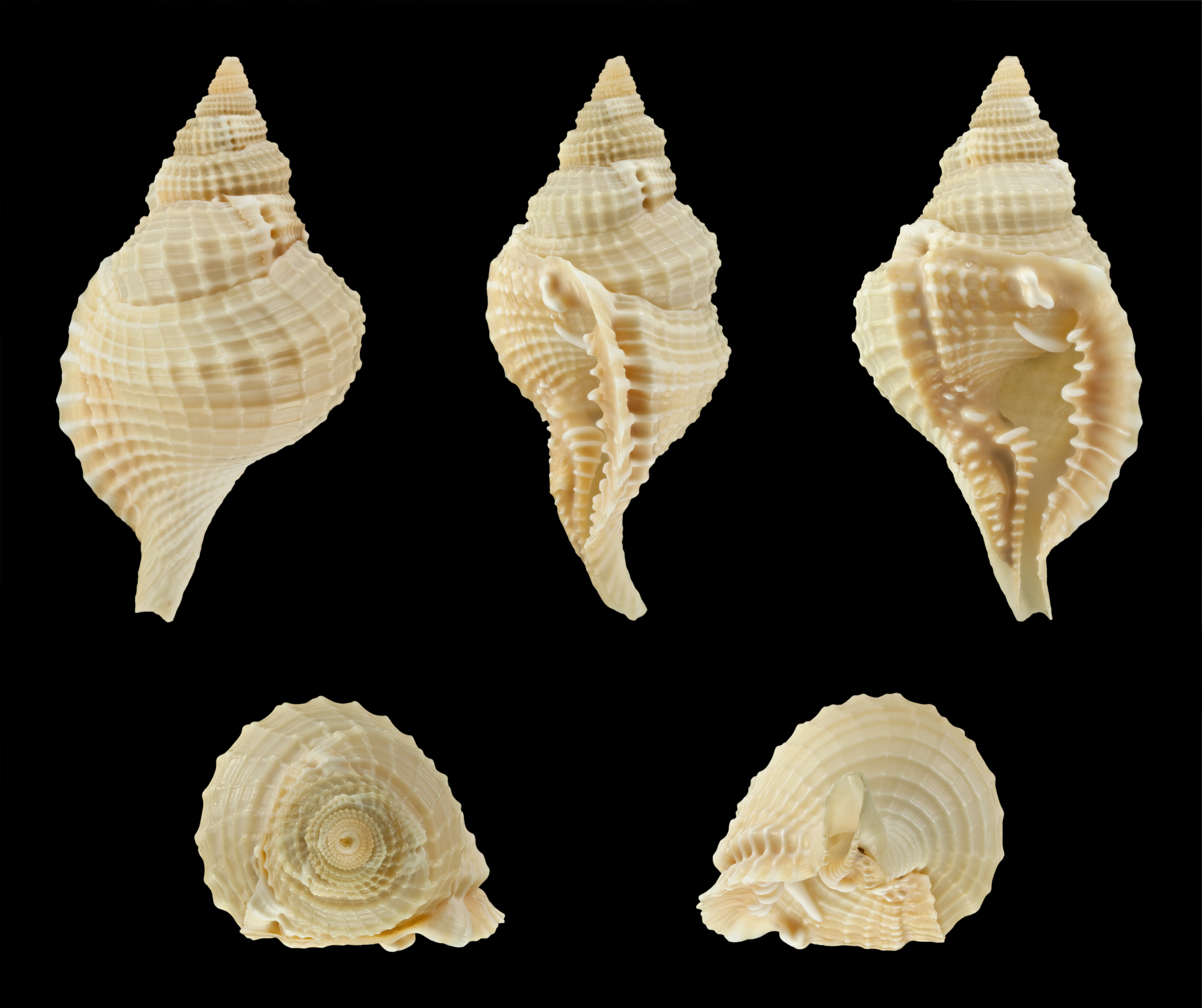
- Distorsio reticularis (Linnaeus, 1758)

Scientific classification
- Kingdom: Animalia
- Phylum: Mollusca
- Class: Gastropoda
- Subclass: Caenogastropoda
- Order: Littorinimorpha
- Superfamily: Tonnoidea
- Family: Personidae
- Genus: Distorsio
- Species: D. reticularis

Binomial name
- Distorsio reticularis (Linnaeus, 1758)

Synonyms
- Distorsio (Distorsio) reticularis (Linnaeus, 1758); Distorsio acuta Perry, 1811; Distorsio decipiens (Reeve, 1844) ·; Distorsio francesae Iredale, 1931; Distorsio reticulata Röding, 1798; Distorta acuta Perry, 1811; Distortrix cancellinus Roissy; Distortrix reticulata (Röding, 1798); Murex mulus Dillwyn, 1817; Murex reticularis Linnaeus, 1758; † Nassa lamonganana K. Martin, 1884; † Tritia lamonganana (K. Martin, 1884) ·; Triton decipiens Reeve, 1844

= Distorsio reticularis =

Species of mollusc

Distorsio reticularis, common name reticulate distorsio, is a species of medium-sized sea snail, a marine gastropod mollusk in the family Personidae, the Distortio snails.

== Subspecies ==
- Distorsio reticularis francesae Iredale, 1931

== Distribution ==
This species is widespread in the Indo-Western Pacific, including the Persian Gulf, to Melanesia, north to Japan, China Sea, Taiwan, Philippines and south to Queensland.

== Habitat ==
These sea snails live in tropical coral reef, at depths of about 10 to 100 m.

== Description ==
Shells of Distorsio reticularis can reach a length of 40–94 millimetres (1.6–3.7 in). These shells are fusiform, inflated and roughly sculptured with axial and spiral ribs and low axial varices. Spire whorls are irregular, with a wavering suture. The aperture is narrow and distorted (hence the genus name), with strong teeth on the lips and a moderately developed callus. Siphonal canal is rather long and dorsally recurved. Operculum is corneous, irregularly ovate.

== Biology ==
These sea snails probably are carnivorous. Sexes are separate. After hatching larvae are free-swimming.

== Bibliography ==
- A.G. Hinton - Guide to Australian Shells
- A.G. Hinton - Guide to Shells of Papua New Guinea
- A.G. Hinton - Shells of New Guinea & Central Pacific
- B. Dharma - Indonesian Shells I
- Barry Wilson - Australian Marine Shells Part 1
- Beu, A. (2010). Catalogue of Tonnoidea. Pers. comm.
- Deepak Apte – The Book of Indian Shells
- F. Pinn - Sea Snails of Pondicherry
- F. Springsteen and F. M. Leobrera - Shells of the Philippines
- Hsi-Jen Tao - Shells of Taiwan Illustrated in Colour
- Ngoc-Thach Nguyên - Shells of Vietnam
- R. Tucker Abbott - Seashells of South East Asia
