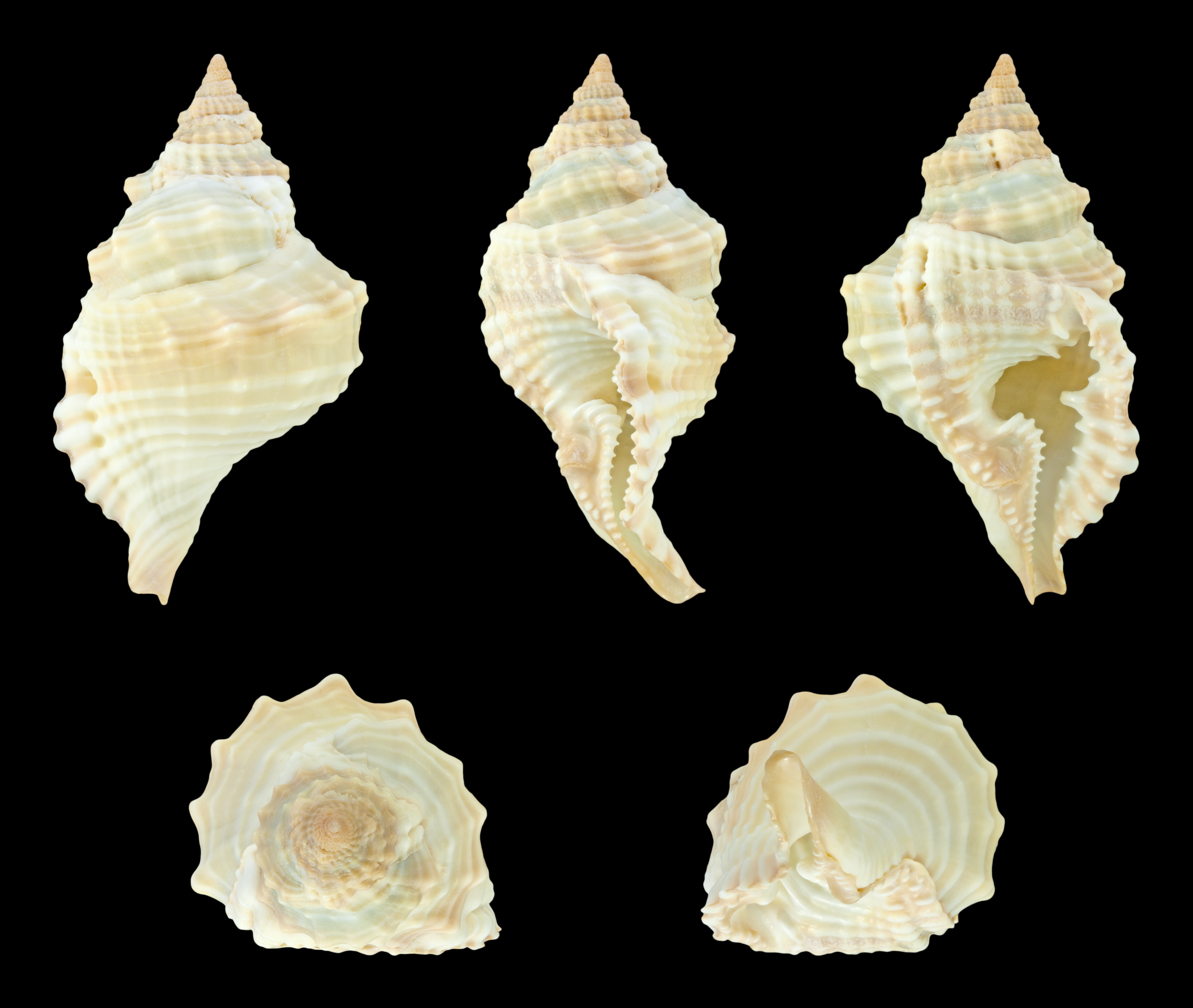
- A shell of Distorsio smithi

Scientific classification
- Kingdom: Animalia
- Phylum: Mollusca
- Class: Gastropoda
- Subclass: Caenogastropoda
- Order: Littorinimorpha
- Superfamily: Tonnoidea
- Family: Personidae
- Genus: Distorsio
- Species: D. smithi

Binomial name
- Distorsio smithi (Maltzan, 1884)

Synonyms
- Persona smithi von Maltzan, 1884

= Distorsio smithi =

Species of gastropod

Distorsio smithi, common name Smith's distorsio, is a species of medium-sized sea snail, a marine gastropod mollusk in the family Personidae, the Distortio snails.

== Description ==
The size of the shell varies between 40 mm and 112 mm.

== Distribution ==
This species occurs in the Atlantic Ocean off the Cape Verdes, Mauritania, Gabon and Angola.
