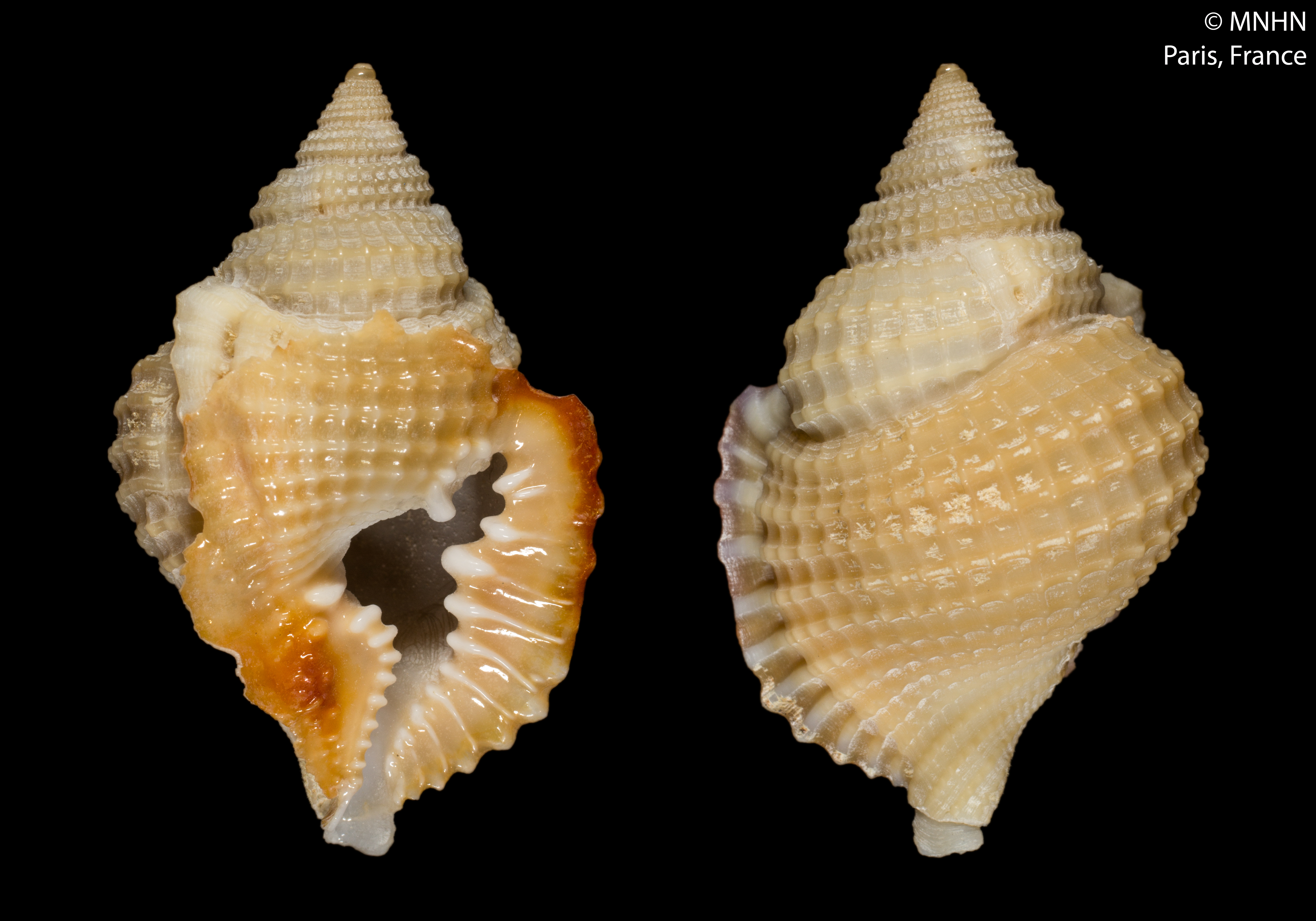
- Shell of Distorsio parvimpedita (holotype at MNHN, Paris)

Scientific classification
- Kingdom: Animalia
- Phylum: Mollusca
- Class: Gastropoda
- Subclass: Caenogastropoda
- Order: Littorinimorpha
- Superfamily: Tonnoidea
- Family: Personidae
- Genus: Distorsio
- Species: D. parvimpedita

Binomial name
- Distorsio parvimpedita Beu, 1998

= Distorsio parvimpedita =

Species of gastropod

Distorsio parvimpedita is a species of medium-sized sea snail, a marine gastropod mollusk in the family Personidae, the Distortio snails.

== Description ==
The length of the shell attains 47.5 mm. It is short and wide, with a short spire, moderately inflated whorls, and a rapidly contracted base.

== Distribution ==
The species is confined to the waters off New Caledonia, more specifically off Touho, Noumea, and Ile de Pins. It has been found in soft substances in depths between 25 metres (82 ft) and 70 metres (230 ft).
