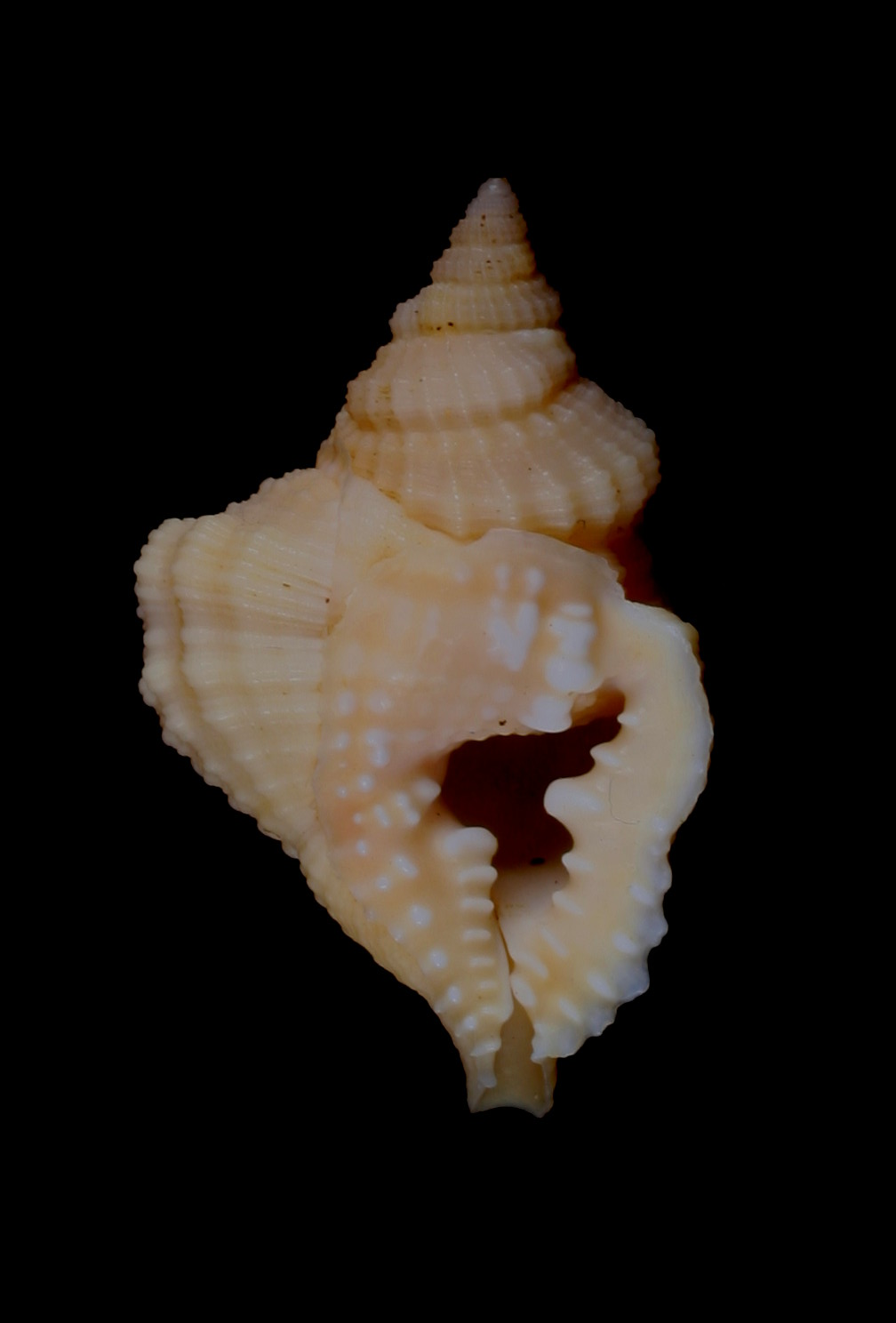
- Apertural view of Distorsio habei Lewis, 1972

Scientific classification
- Kingdom: Animalia
- Phylum: Mollusca
- Class: Gastropoda
- Subclass: Caenogastropoda
- Order: Littorinimorpha
- Superfamily: Tonnoidea
- Family: Personidae
- Genus: Distorsio
- Species: D. habei

Binomial name
- Distorsio habei Lewis, 1972

Synonyms
- † Distorsio (Rhysema) kotakai Ogasawara & Morita, 1990 · unaccepted; † Distorsio (Rhysema) yagenaensis H. Noda, 1980 ·; Distorsio constricta habei Lewis, 1972

= Distorsio habei =

Species of gastropod

Distorsio habei is a species of medium-sized sea snail, a marine gastropod mollusk in the family Personidae, the Distortio snails.

== Description ==
The length of the shell attains 62 mm.

Distorsio habei is commonly known as the Habe's distortio snail. It is found in the western Pacific Ocean, specifically in the waters around Japan, the Philippines, and Indonesia.

This species of sea snail has a medium-sized, elongated shell with a pointed spire and a distinct shoulder at the base of the body whorl. The shell is covered with spiral ridges and has a pale orange or pinkish-brown color with darker brown spots. The aperture, or opening of the shell, is oval-shaped and has a thickened outer lip.

Distorsio habei is a carnivorous snail that feeds on other mollusks, including bivalves and gastropods. It is also known to prey on small fish and crustaceans. This species is active during the night and hides in crevices and under rocks during the day.

Due to its attractive shell and its predatory nature, Distorsio habei is sometimes collected by shell collectors and can be found in the ornamental shell trade. However, the species is not currently listed as endangered or threatened by any major conservation organizations.

== Distribution ==
This marine species occurs in the Western Pacific and off the Philippines, Japan, Taiwan, the Tonga Islands, the Solomon Islands, the New Hebrides, New Caledonia, the Coral Sea, the Kermadec Islands and Australia (New South Wales, Queensland, Western Australia)
