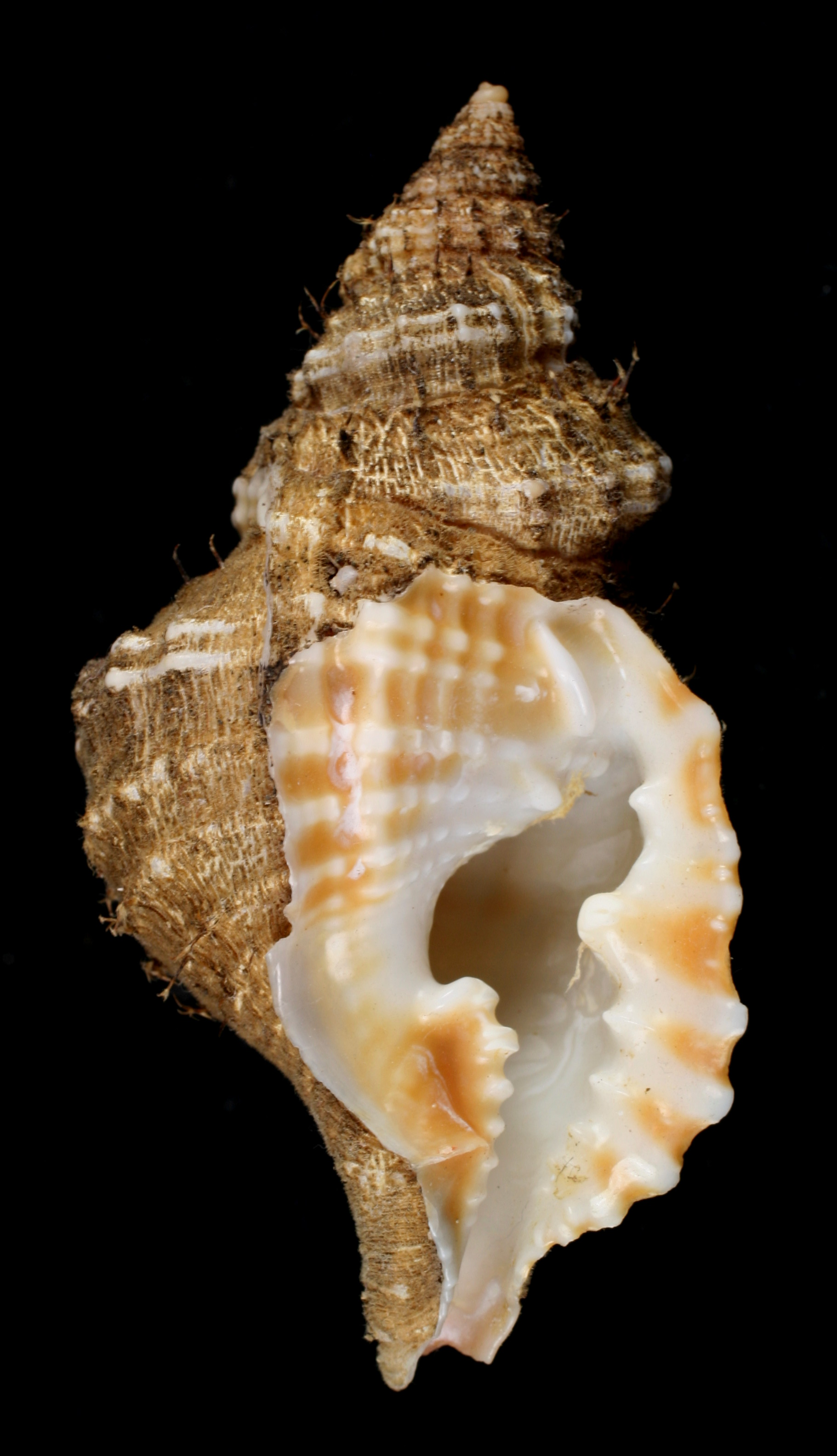
- Apertural view of Distorsio decussata (Valenciennes, 1832)

Scientific classification
- Kingdom: Animalia
- Phylum: Mollusca
- Class: Gastropoda
- Subclass: Caenogastropoda
- Order: Littorinimorpha
- Superfamily: Tonnoidea
- Family: Personidae
- Genus: Distorsio
- Species: D. decussata

Binomial name
- Distorsio decussata (Valenciennes, 1832)

Synonyms
- Triton decussata Valenciennes, 1832; Tritonium decussatum Valenciennes, 1832

= Distorsio decussata =

Species of gastropod

Distorsio decussata, commonly named the decussate distorsio, is a species of medium-sized sea snail, a marine gastropod mollusk in the family Personidae, the Distortio snails.

== Description ==
The length of the shell varies between 30 mm and 85 mm.

== Distribution ==
This marine species occurs from the Gulf of California, W Mexico to Peru.
