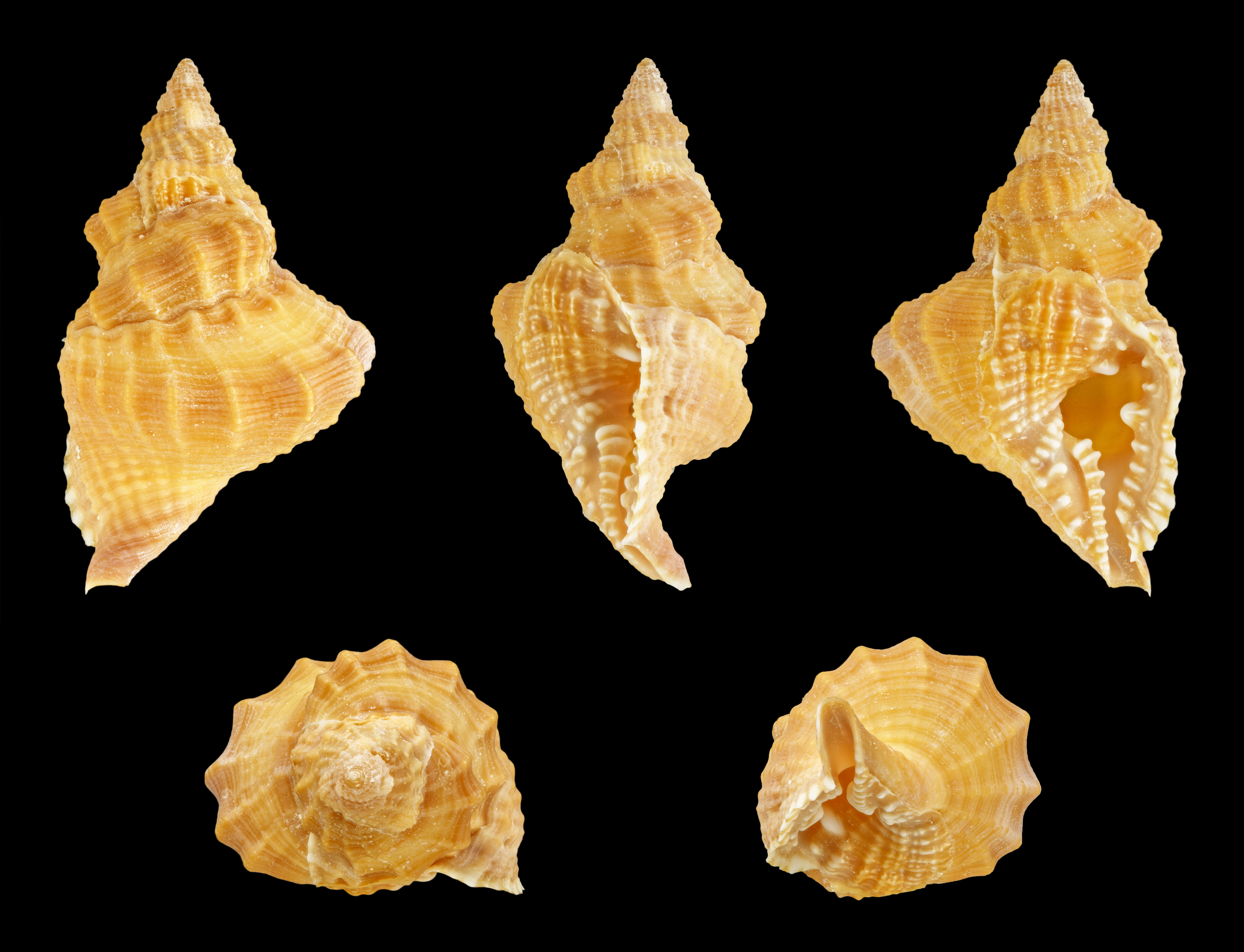
- Five views of a shell of Distorsio kurzi Petuch & Harasewych, 1980

Scientific classification
- Kingdom: Animalia
- Phylum: Mollusca
- Class: Gastropoda
- Subclass: Caenogastropoda
- Order: Littorinimorpha
- Superfamily: Tonnoidea
- Family: Personidae
- Genus: Distorsio
- Species: D. kurzi

Binomial name
- Distorsio kurzi Petuch & Harasewych, 1980

Synonyms
- Distorsio (Rhysema) kurzi Petuch & Harasewych, 1980

= Distorsio kurzi =

Species of gastropod

Distorsio kurzi, common name Kurz's distorsio, is a species of medium-sized sea snail, a marine gastropod mollusk in the family Personidae, the Distortio snails.

== Description ==
The size of the shell varies between 30 and 64 mm (1.2 and 2.5 in).

== Distribution ==
This marine species occurs off Southeast Africa, Mozambique, the Andamans, the Philippines, and in the Western Pacific (Vanuatu); in the Coral Sea, and off New Caledonia.
