= Distorsio somalica =

Scientific classification
- Kingdom: Animalia
- Phylum: Mollusca
- Class: Gastropoda
- Subclass: Caenogastropoda
- Order: Littorinimorpha
- Superfamily: Tonnoidea
- Family: Personidae
- Genus: Distorsio
- Species: D. somalica

Binomial name
- Distorsio somalica Parth, 1990

Species of gastropod

Distorsio somalica is a species of medium-sized sea snail, a marine gastropod mollusk in the family Personidae, the Distortio snails.

== Description ==
The length of the shell attains 58 mm.

== Distribution ==
This marine species occurs off Somalia.
