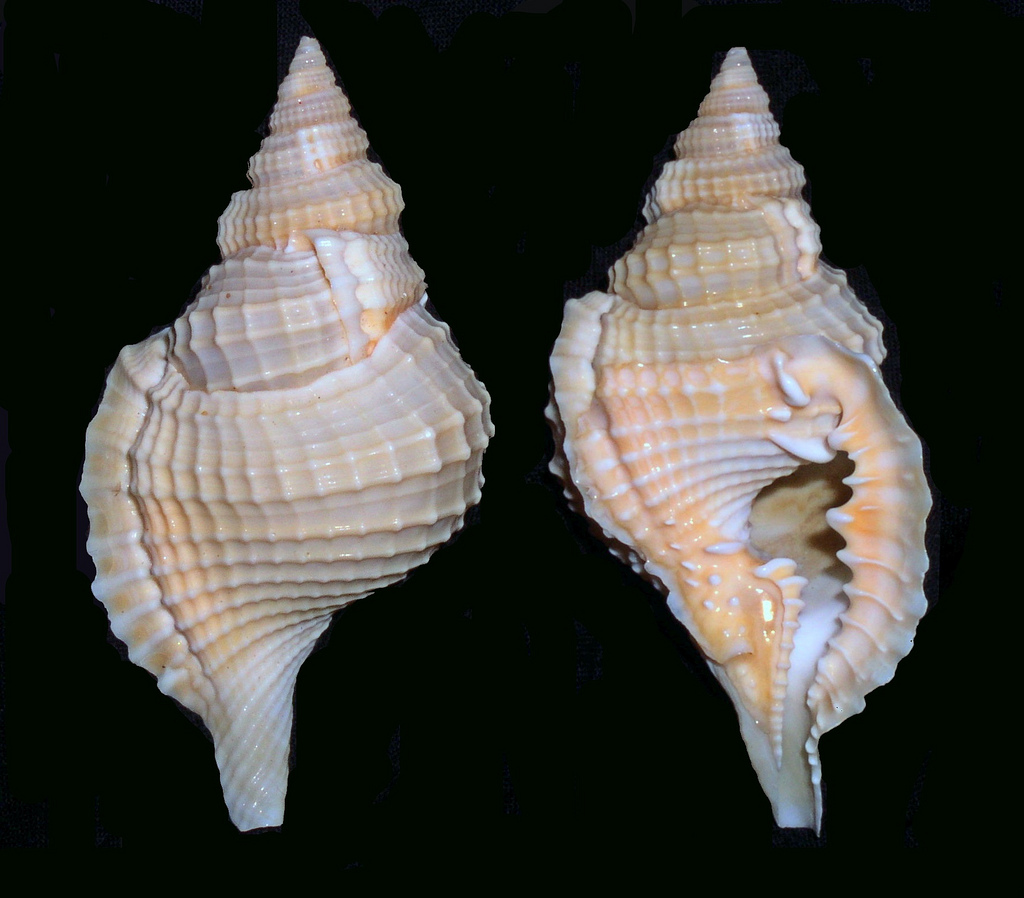

Scientific classification
- Kingdom: Animalia
- Phylum: Mollusca
- Class: Gastropoda
- Subclass: Caenogastropoda
- Order: Littorinimorpha
- Superfamily: Tonnoidea
- Family: Personidae
- Genus: Distorsio
- Species: D. perdistorta

Binomial name
- Distorsio perdistorta Fulton, 1938

Synonyms
- Distorsio (Rhysema) horrida Kuroda & Habe in Habe, 1961

= Distorsio perdistorta =

Species of gastropod

Distorsio perdistorta, common name the bristly distorsio, is a species of medium-sized sea snail, a marine gastropod mollusk in the family Personidae, the Distortio snails.

== Distribution ==
This marine species has a wide distribution and occurs in the Indo-West Pacific; the Atlantic Ocean and in the Caribbean Sea.

== Description ==
The maximum recorded shell length is 89.5 mm.

Shell up to 80 mm, with a moderately high spire and a strongly distorted profile. The protoconch is large (2 mm), globose, distinctly cyrtoconoid with three smooth whorls. The teleoconch consists of 7-8 whorls. The body whorlis compressed on the side of the aperture and increasingly inflated opposite to it. The sculpture shows low spiral cords, and of narrow axial ribs which form indistinct nodes where crossing the spirals. The interspaces between the cords are furnished with a small intervening cordlet. Varixes are situated at about each 3/4 of a whorl over the last whorls. The aperture is subtriangular, considerably constricted by outgrowths of the outer lip and of the columellar edge. The outer lip is provided with 6-7 elongate denticles of which the third (from adapical side) is markedly larger. The parietal edge has a broad, thin and shiny callus, continued to form a broad shield also bordering the columella; provided with small blunt tubercles and molded over the varix of the preceding whorl but never bearing a distinct plait or denticle on the adapical side. The columellar edge forms a thick outgrowth which extends over the aperture, provided with denticles which increase in size towards the adapical side. The siphonal canal is short. The periostracum is hairy, rather short over most of the surface, with longer bristles over the varices. The colour of the shell is whitish to tan, the aperture tinged with brown on the edge of the outer lip and on the parietal/columellar shield.

This species is distinguished from the West African Distorsio smithi (von Maltzan, 1887) in being smaller, with a more attenuated sculpture.

== Habitat ==
Minimum recorded depth is 72 m (236 ft). Maximum recorded depth is 282 m (925 ft).
