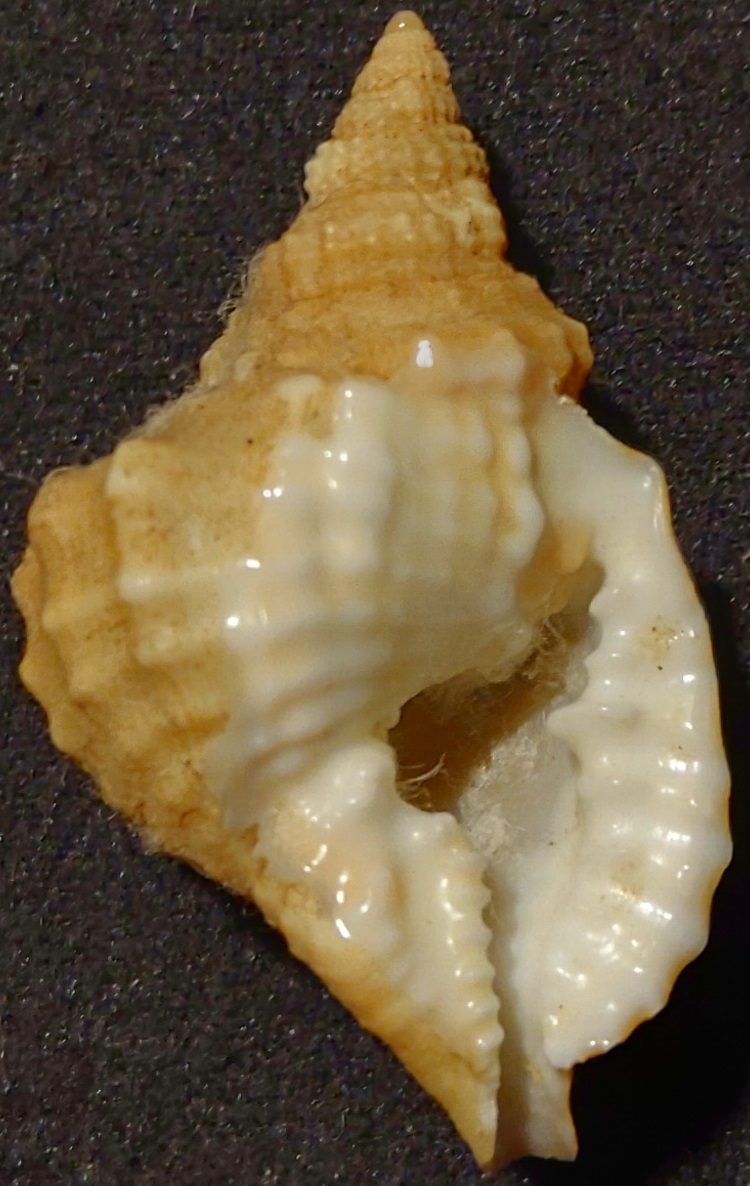
- Shell of Distorsio Minoruohnishii

Scientific classification
- Kingdom: Animalia
- Phylum: Mollusca
- Class: Gastropoda
- Subclass: Caenogastropoda
- Order: Littorinimorpha
- Superfamily: Tonnoidea
- Family: Personidae
- Genus: Distorsio
- Species: D. minoruohnishii

Binomial name
- Distorsio minoruohnishii Parth, 1989

Synonyms
- Distorsio minorjohnishii M. Parth, 1989

= Distorsio minoruohnishii =

Species of gastropod

Distorsio minoruohnishii is a species of medium-sized sea snail, a marine gastropod mollusk in the family Personidae, the Distortio snails.

== Description ==
The length of the shell attains 44.5 mm.

== Distribution ==
This marine species occurs in the Pacific Ocean off Costa Rica and Panama; also off the Galapagos Islands.
