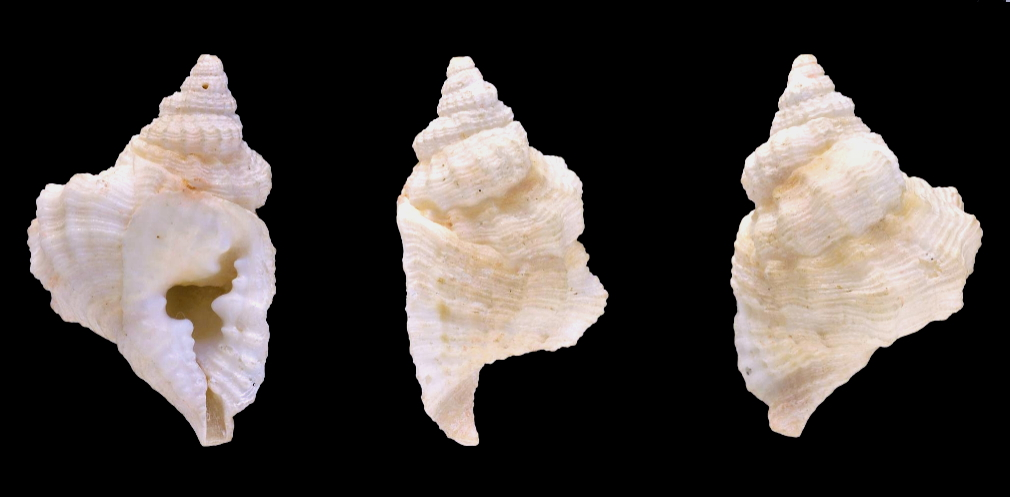
- Shell of Distorsio euconstricta (holotype at the Smithsonian Institution)

Scientific classification
- Kingdom: Animalia
- Phylum: Mollusca
- Class: Gastropoda
- Subclass: Caenogastropoda
- Order: Littorinimorpha
- Superfamily: Tonnoidea
- Family: Personidae
- Genus: Distorsio
- Species: D. euconstricta

Binomial name
- Distorsio euconstricta Beu, 1987

Synonyms
- Distorsio (Distorsio) euconstricta Beu, 1987

= Distorsio euconstricta =

Species of gastropod

Distorsio euconstricta is a species of medium-sized sea snail, a marine gastropod mollusk in the family Personidae, the Distortio snails.

== Description ==
The length of the shell attains 64 mm.

== Distribution ==
This marine species has a wide distribution in the Indo-West Pacific; also off the Philippines, in the South China Sea, off New Caledonia and Western Australia.
