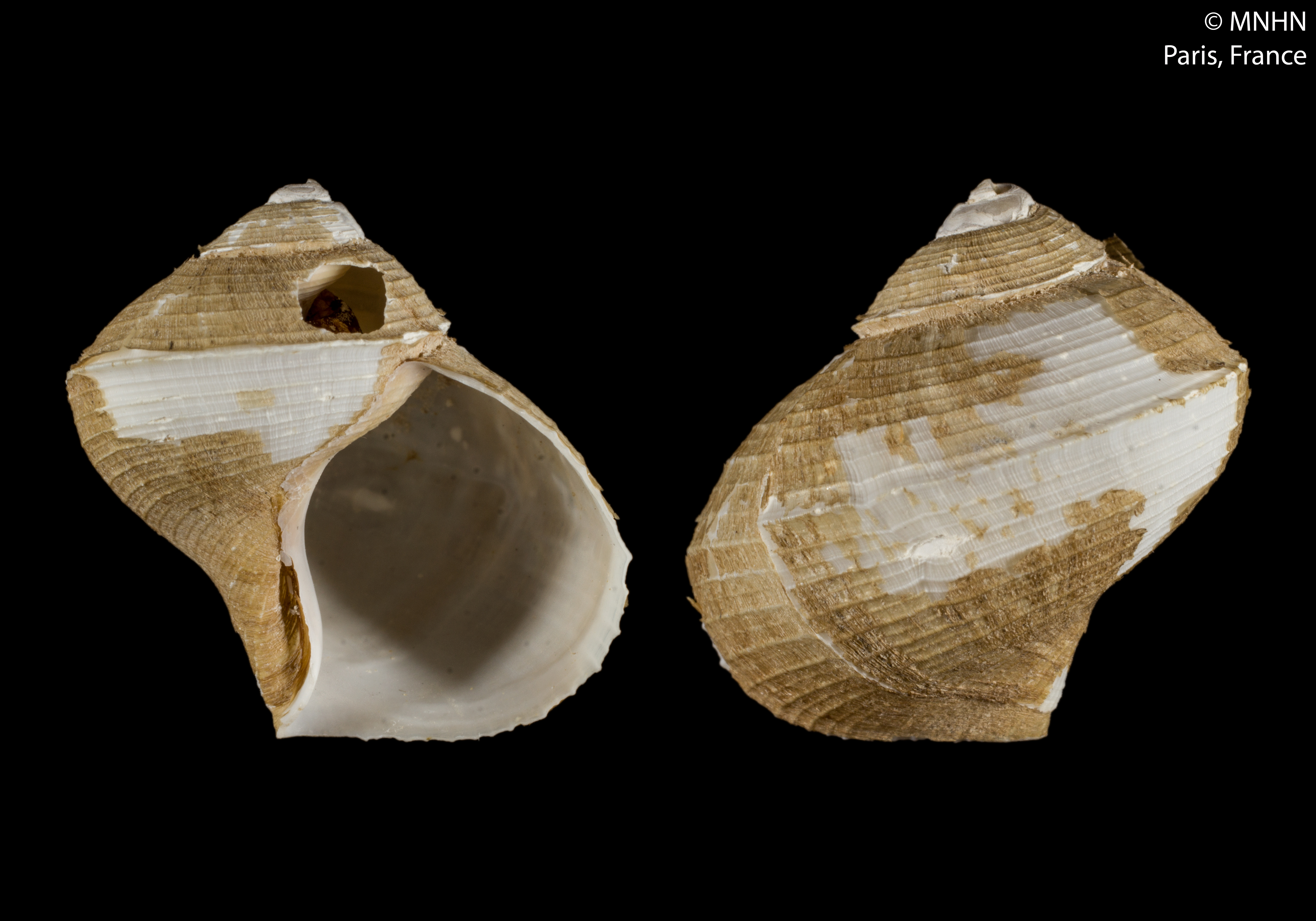
- Shell of Laubierina peregrinator (holotype at MNHN, Paris)

Scientific classification
- Kingdom: Animalia
- Phylum: Mollusca
- Class: Gastropoda
- Subclass: Caenogastropoda
- Order: Littorinimorpha
- Superfamily: Tonnoidea
- Family: Laubierinidae
- Genus: Laubierina; A. Warén & Ph. Bouchet, 1990

Type species
- Laubierina peregrinator Warén & Bouchet, 1990

= Laubierina =

Genus of gastropods

Laubierina is a genus of sea snails, marine gastropod mollusks in the family Laubierinidae.

== Species ==
- Laubierina peregrinator Warén & Bouchet, 1990
