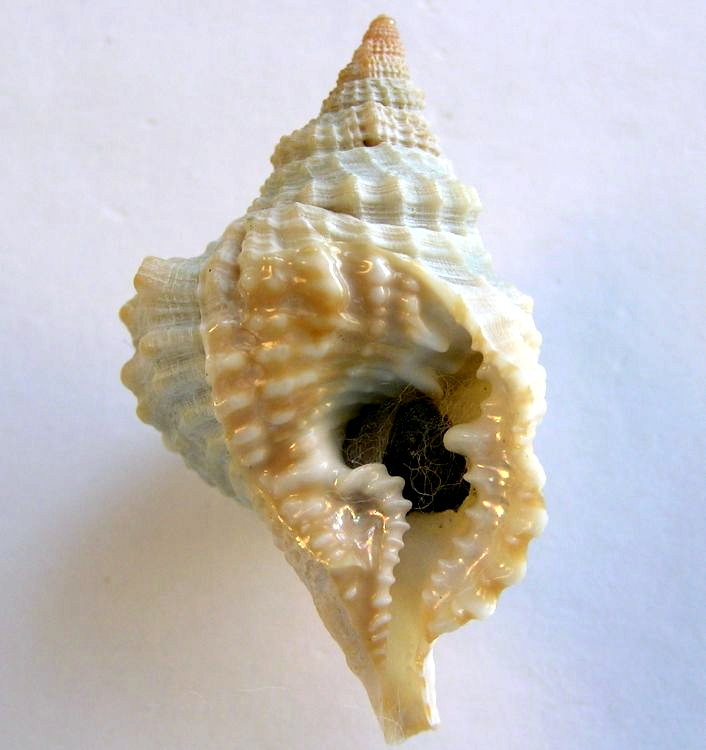
- Shell of Distorsio mcgintyi

Scientific classification
- Kingdom: Animalia
- Phylum: Mollusca
- Class: Gastropoda
- Subclass: Caenogastropoda
- Order: Littorinimorpha
- Superfamily: Tonnoidea
- Family: Personidae
- Genus: Distorsio
- Species: D. mcgintyi

Binomial name
- Distorsio mcgintyi Emerson & Puffer, 1953

Synonyms
- Distorsio constricta floridana Olsson & McGinty, 1951 (invalid: secondary junior homonym of Personella floridana Gardner, 1947;D. mcgintyi is a replacement name); Distorsio constricta mcgintyi Emerson & Puffer, 1953

= Distorsio mcgintyi =

Species of gastropod

Distorsio mcgintyi is a species of medium-sized sea snail, a marine gastropod mollusk in the family Personidae, the Distortio snails.

== Description ==
The length of the shell attains 32 mm.

== Distribution ==
This species occurs in the Gulf of Mexico, mainly off Florida.
