= Personopsis grasi =

Scientific classification
- Kingdom: Animalia
- Phylum: Mollusca
- Class: Gastropoda
- Subclass: Caenogastropoda
- Order: Littorinimorpha
- Family: Personidae
- Genus: Personopsis
- Species: P. grasi

Binomial name
- Personopsis grasi (Bellardi in d'Ancona, 1872)

Synonyms
- Triton grasi Bellardi in d'Ancona, 1872

Species of gastropod

Personopsis grasi is a species of medium-sized sea snail, a marine gastropod mollusc in the family Personidae.
