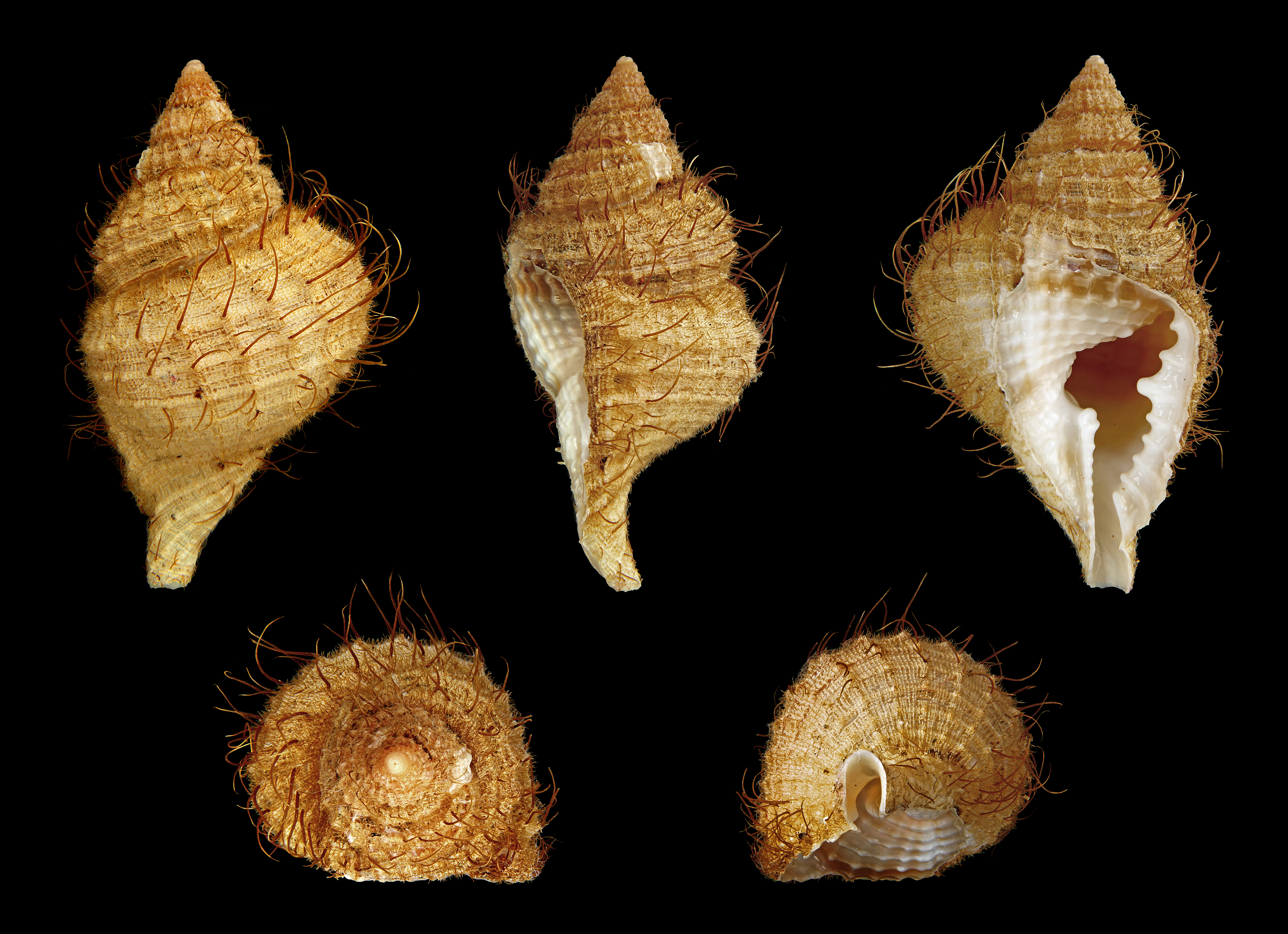
- Five views of a shell of Distorsio muehlhaeusseri with its periostracum intact

Scientific classification
- Kingdom: Animalia
- Phylum: Mollusca
- Class: Gastropoda
- Subclass: Caenogastropoda
- Order: Littorinimorpha
- Superfamily: Tonnoidea
- Family: Personidae
- Genus: Distorsio
- Species: D. muehlhaeusseri

Binomial name
- Distorsio muehlhaeusseri Parth, 1990

Synonyms
- Distorsio ventricosa Kronenberg, 1994

= Distorsio muehlhaeusseri =

Species of gastropod

Distorsio muehlhaeusseri is a species of medium-sized sea snail, a marine gastropod mollusk in the family Personidae, the Distortio snails.

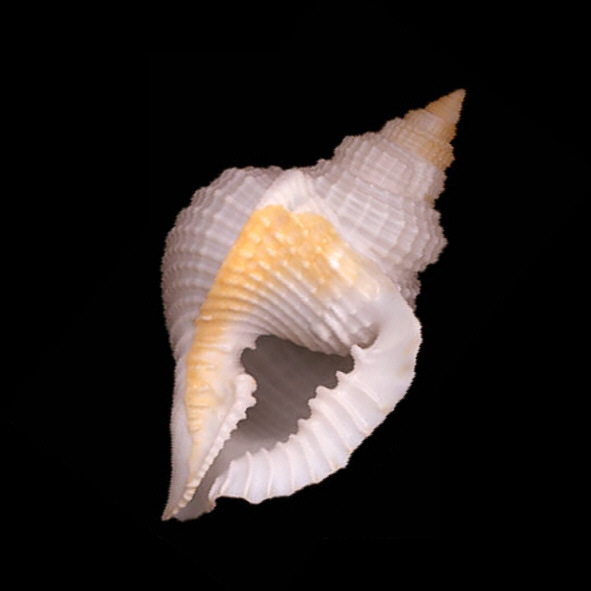
Apertural view of shell of Distorsio muehlhaeusseri Kronenberg, 1994

== Description ==
Original description: "Shell of medium size for the genus (max. mm 80), of a whitish colour. The whorls are less twisted (and consequently more regular) than in D. perdistorta. There are 8 main spiral cords, with several interstitial cordlets. The axial riblets number from 25 to 30 and form little nodules where they cross the spiral cords. The aperture (which is a very important feature in Distorsio for differentiation at specific level) is small and the white to brownish parietal shield is thicker and of a clearly darker colour in the Somali specimens than in the Philippine ones. The external lip is wide but the profile of its external edge is straight, almost parallel to the axis of the shell, except at the inferior end which bends sharply towards the siphonal canal."

== Distribution ==
Locus typicus: "Deep water off Bohol Island, Philippines."

This marine species occurs off Somalia.
