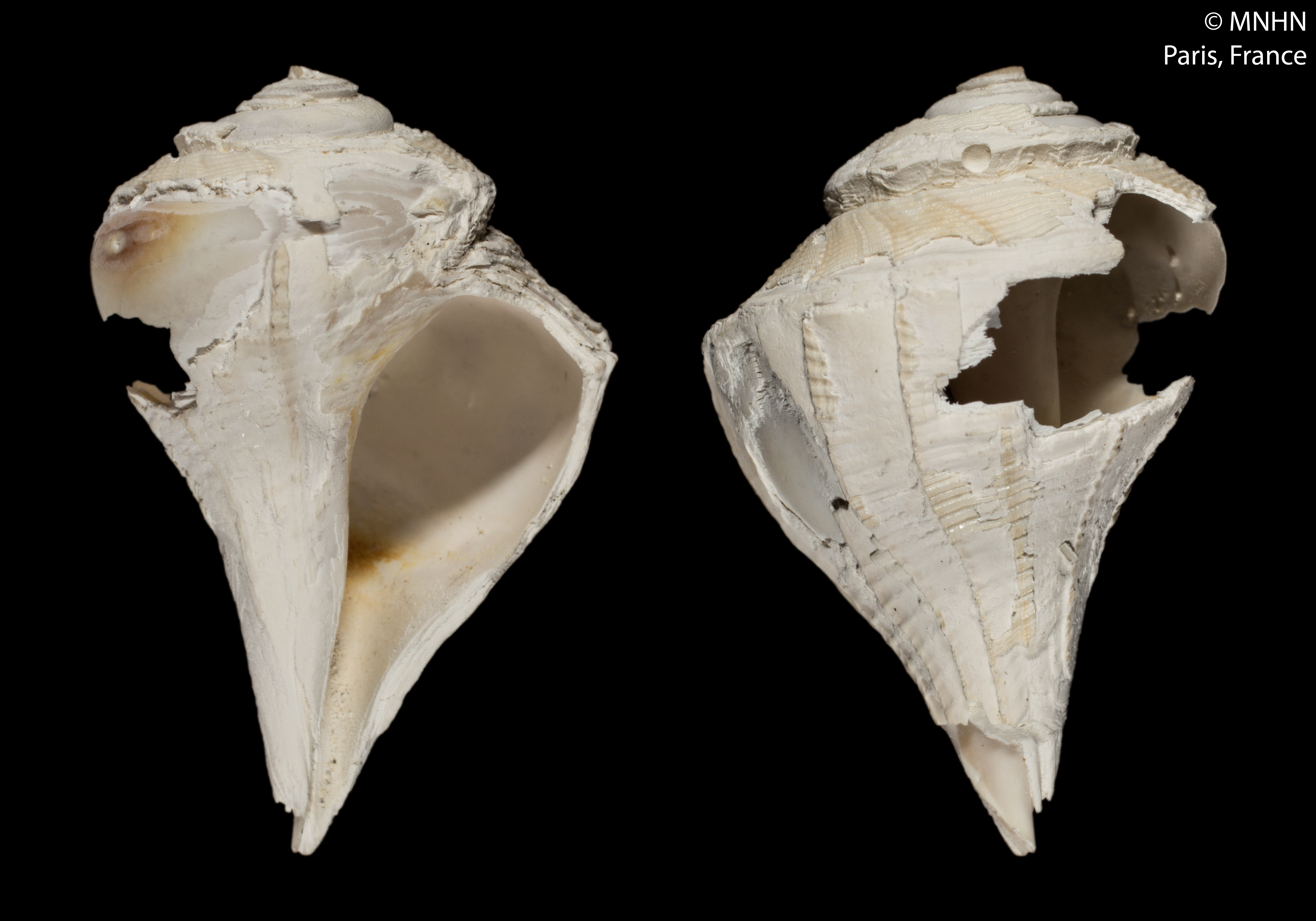

Scientific classification
- Kingdom: Animalia
- Phylum: Mollusca
- Class: Gastropoda
- Subclass: Caenogastropoda
- Order: Littorinimorpha
- Family: Thalassocyonidae
- Genus: Thalassocyon
- Species: T. wareni

Binomial name
- Thalassocyon wareni Riedel, 2000

= Thalassocyon wareni =

Species of gastropod

Thalassocyon wareni is a species of sea snail, a marine gastropod mollusk in the family Thalassocyonidae. T. wareni gets its name from the man who documented the species for the first time, Anders Warén.

== Description ==
The length of the shell attains a small 24.4 mm. The shell has an inner 'spinous' support, and contains turns.

The animal has a small foot, a pronounced anterior siphonal flap, a long proboscis and two long antennae.

The animal has two large salivitory glands, and long tapered radula.

Males have an open pallial gonoduct, which presents as a groove in the animal's large penis.

== Distribution ==
This species occurs in the Indian Ocean Abyssal Province and off the Saint Paul Island in the French Southern and Antarctic Lands.
