= D. constricta =

D. constricta may refer to:

- Distorsio constricta, a sea snail species
- Dysgonia constricta, a moth species found in New Guinea, New South Wales and Queensland
