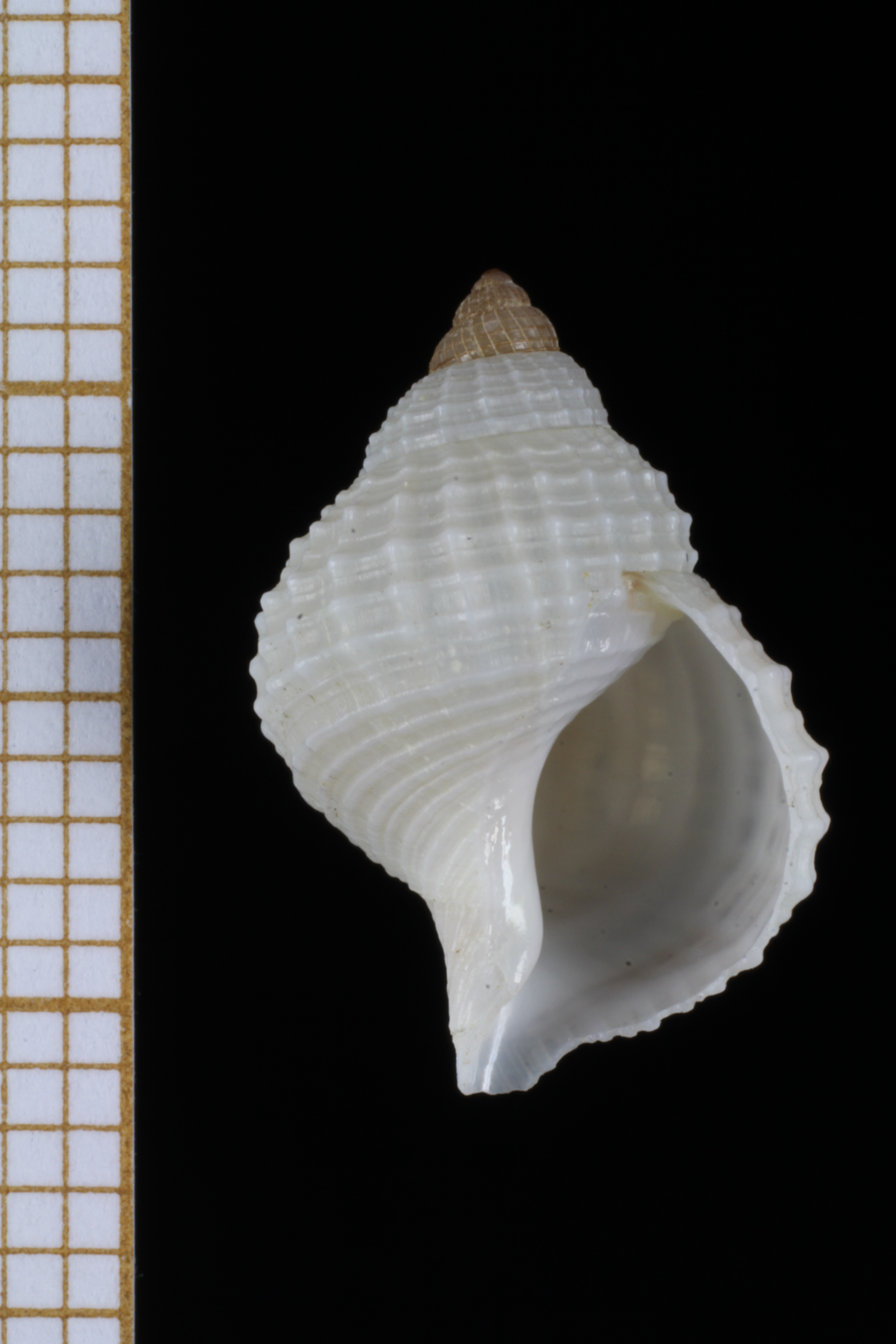
- Shell of Pisanianura grimaldii (specimen at MNHN, Paris)

Scientific classification
- Kingdom: Animalia
- Phylum: Mollusca
- Class: Gastropoda
- Subclass: Caenogastropoda
- Order: Littorinimorpha
- Superfamily: Tonnoidea
- Family: Laubierinidae
- Genus: Pisanianura; Rovereto, 1899

Type species
- † Murex inflatus Brocchi, 1814

Synonyms
- † Anura Bellardi, 1873 (invalid: junior homonym of Anura Hodgson, 1841 [Aves]; Pisanianura is a replacement name); † Kaiparanura Laws, 1944; † Nawenia Ladd, 1977

= Pisanianura =

Genus of gastropods

Pisanianura is a genus of sea snails, marine gastropod mollusks in the family Laubierinidae.

== Species ==
- † Pisanianura borsoni (Bellardi, 1873)
- † Pisanianura craverii (Bellardi, 1873)
- Pisanianura grimaldii (Dautzenberg, 1899)
- † Pisanianura inflata (Brocchi, 1814)
- † Pisanianura spiralis (P. Marshall, 1918)

Synonyms

- Pisanianura breviaxis (Kuroda & Habe, 1961): synonym of Laminilabrum breviaxe Kuroda & Habe, 1961
