= Thalassocyon bonus =

Scientific classification
- Kingdom: Animalia
- Phylum: Mollusca
- Class: Gastropoda
- Subclass: Caenogastropoda
- Order: Littorinimorpha
- Family: Thalassocyonidae
- Genus: Thalassocyon
- Species: T. bonus

Binomial name
- Thalassocyon bonus Barnard, 1960

Species of gastropod

Thalassocyon bonus is a species of sea snail, a marine gastropod mollusk in the family Thalassocyonidae.
