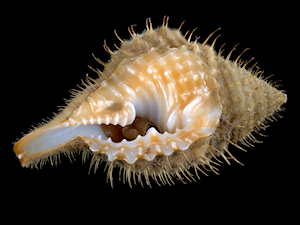

Scientific classification
- Kingdom: Animalia
- Phylum: Mollusca
- Class: Gastropoda
- Subclass: Caenogastropoda
- Order: Littorinimorpha
- Family: Personidae
- Genus: Distorsio
- Species: D. clathrata

Binomial name
- Distorsio clathrata (Lamarck, 1816)

Synonyms
- Distorsio (Rhysema) robinsoni Petuch, 1987; Distorsio acuta occidentalis Mörch, 1877; Distorsio robinsoni Petuch, 1987; Triton clathratum Lamarck, 1816(original combination)

= Distorsio clathrata =

Species of gastropod

Distorsio clathrata, common name the Atlantic distorsio, is a species of medium-sized sea snail, a marine gastropod mollusk in the family Personidae, the Distortio snails.

== Distribution ==
This marine species occurs in the Caribbean Sea, the Gulf of Mexico and off the Lesser Antilles; in the Atlantic Ocean from North Carolina to Northeast Brazil.

== Description ==
The maximum recorded shell length is 79 mm.

== Habitat ==
Minimum recorded depth is 0 m. Maximum recorded depth is 300 m.
