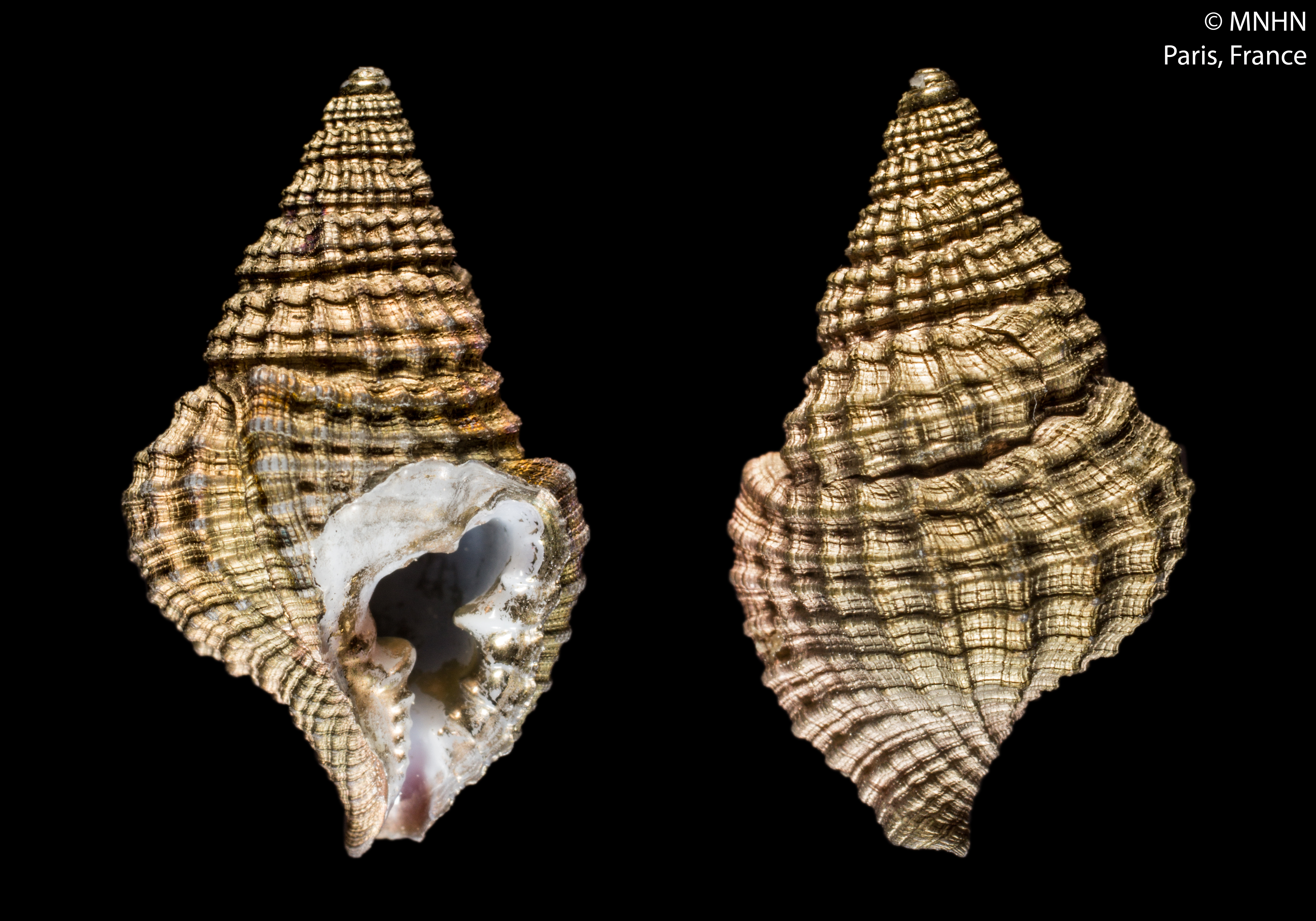
- Shell of Personopsis purpurata (holotype at MNHN, Paris)

Scientific classification
- Kingdom: Animalia
- Phylum: Mollusca
- Class: Gastropoda
- Subclass: Caenogastropoda
- Order: Littorinimorpha
- Superfamily: Tonnoidea
- Family: Personidae
- Genus: Personopsis; Beu, 1988

Type species
- Triton grasi Bellardi in d'Ancona, 1872

Synonyms
- Distorsioninae Beu, 1981; Personinae Gray, 1854 (original rank)

= Personopsis =

Genus of gastropods

Personopsis is a genus of medium-sized sea snails, marine gastropod molluscs in the family Personidae.

== Species ==
Species within the genus Personopsis include:

- † Personopsis alvaradoi (Villalta, 1956) †
- † Personopsis beui (P. A. Maxwell, 1968)
- Personopsis ednafarinasae Parth, 2006
- Personopsis grasi (Bellardi in d'Ancona, 1872)
- † Personopsis interposita (Tate, 1894)
- † Personopsis merlei Vicián & Z. Kovács, 2022
- † Personopsis minae (de Gregorio, 1880)
- Personopsis purpurata Beu, 1998
- † Personopsis rutoti (Vincent, 1930)
- † Personopsis septemdentata (Gabb, 1860)
- Personopsis trigonaperta Beu, 1998

Synonym:

- Personopsis ednafarinasi Parth, 2006: synonym of Personopsis ednafarinasae Parth, 2006 (wrongly formed genitive: named after a woman)
