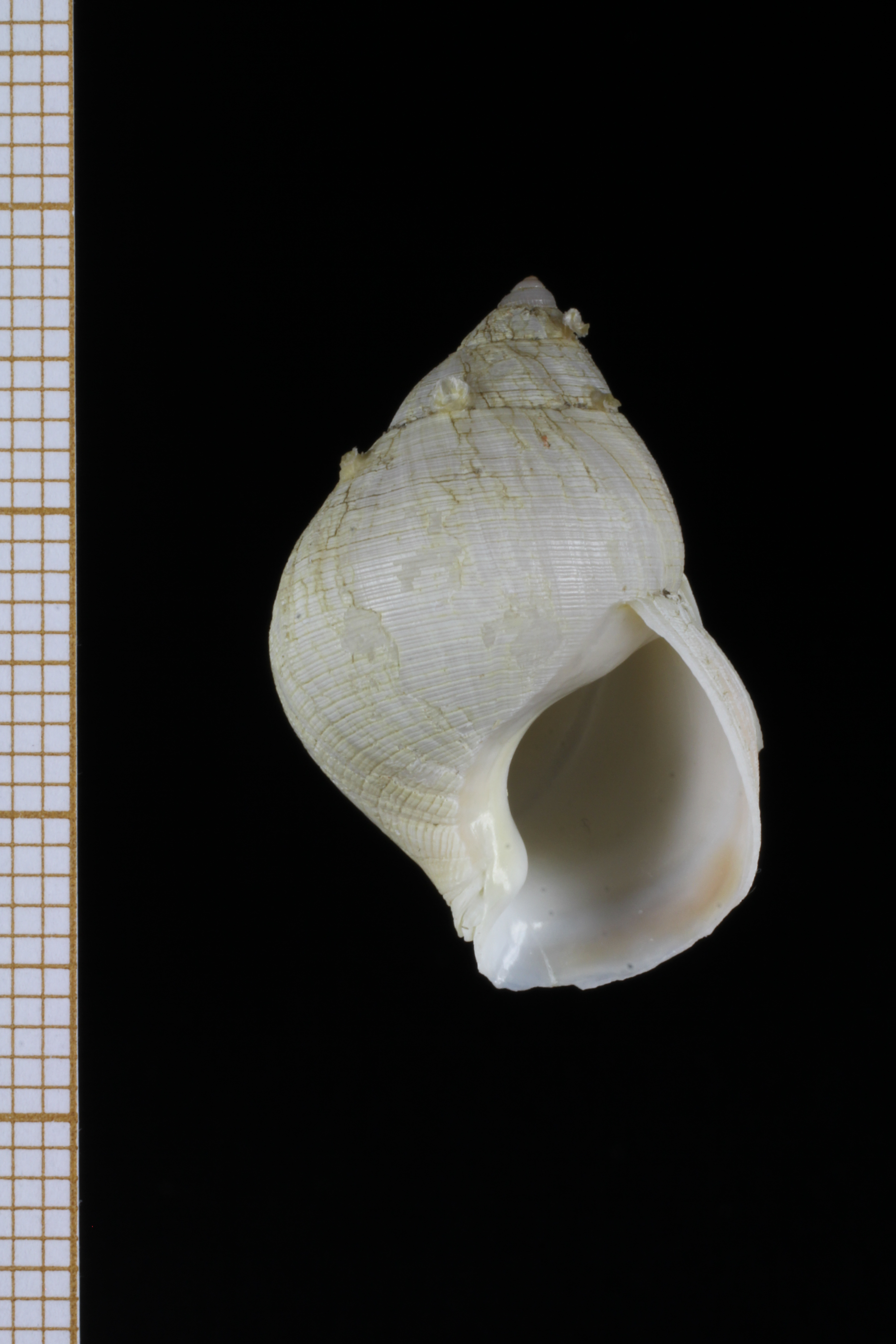
- Shell of Laminilabrum breviaxe (specimen at MNHN, Paris)

Scientific classification
- Kingdom: Animalia
- Phylum: Mollusca
- Class: Gastropoda
- Subclass: Caenogastropoda
- Order: Littorinimorpha
- Superfamily: Tonnoidea
- Family: Laubierinidae
- Genus: Laminilabrum

Type species
- Laminilabrum breviaxe Kuroda & Habe, 1961

= Laminilabrum =

Genus of gastropods

Laminilabrum is a genus of sea snails, marine gastropod mollusks in the family Laubierinidae.

== Species ==
- Laminilabrum breviaxe Kuroda & Habe, 1961
