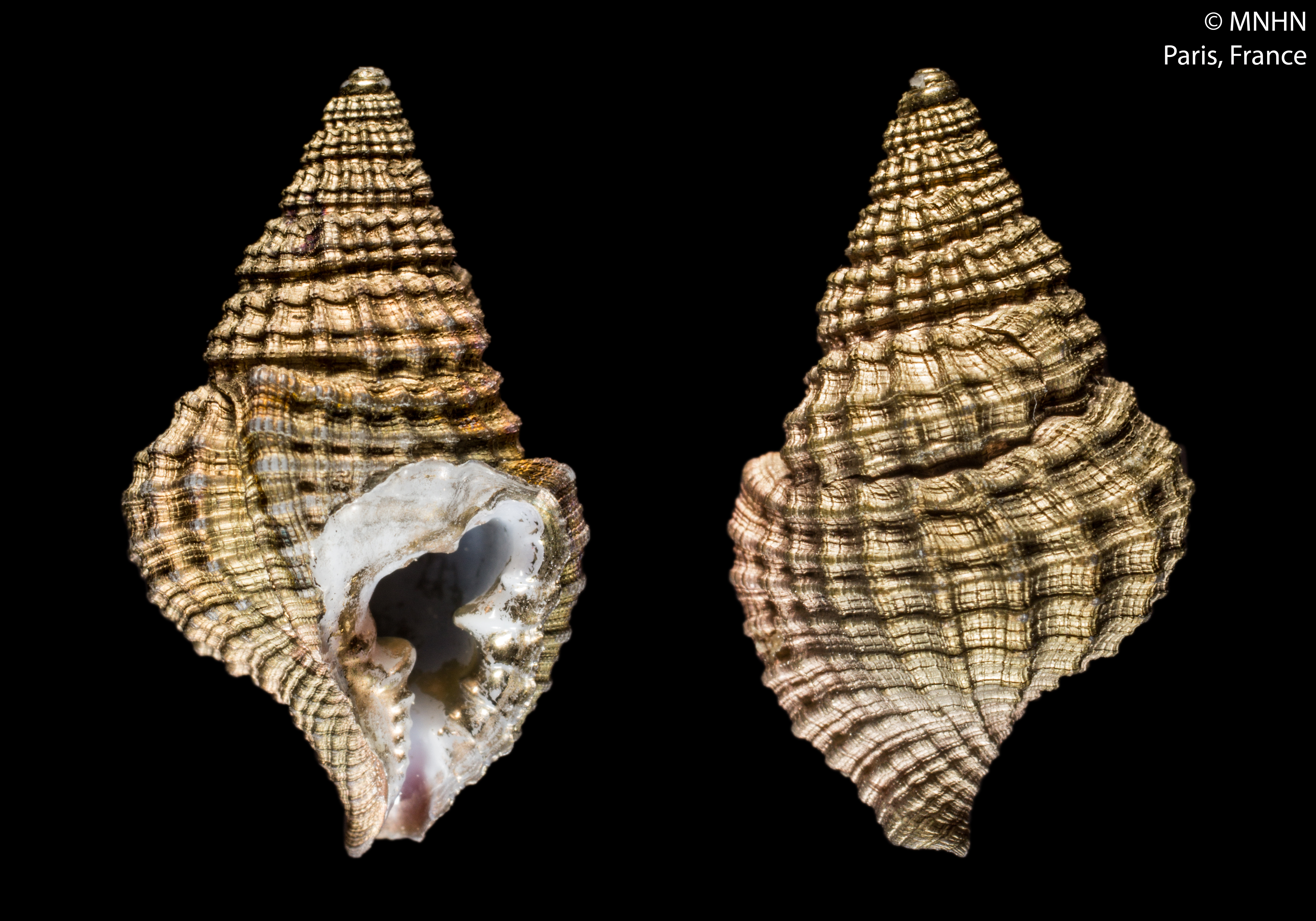
- Shell of Personopsis purpurata( holotype at MNHN, Paris)

Scientific classification
- Kingdom: Animalia
- Phylum: Mollusca
- Class: Gastropoda
- Subclass: Caenogastropoda
- Order: Littorinimorpha
- Family: Personidae
- Genus: Personopsis
- Species: P. purpurata

Binomial name
- Personopsis purpurata Beu, 1998

= Personopsis purpurata =

Species of gastropod

Personopsis purpurata is a species of medium-sized sea snail, a marine gastropod mollusc in the family Personidae.

== Description ==
The length of the shell attains 15.6 mm. It has a broad, biconic shape with a moderately tall spire, a wide last whorl, a somewhat contracted base, and a short anterior canal. The shell is mostly translucent white, with prominent brownish-purple coloration at the anterior siphonal canal and a less noticeable area in the mid-columellar excavation. The outer layer (periostracum) is thin, pale yellow or olive, and covered with long, thick bristles over the ridges and shorter, thinner bristles in the spaces between.

== Distribution ==
This marine species occurs off New Caledonia.
