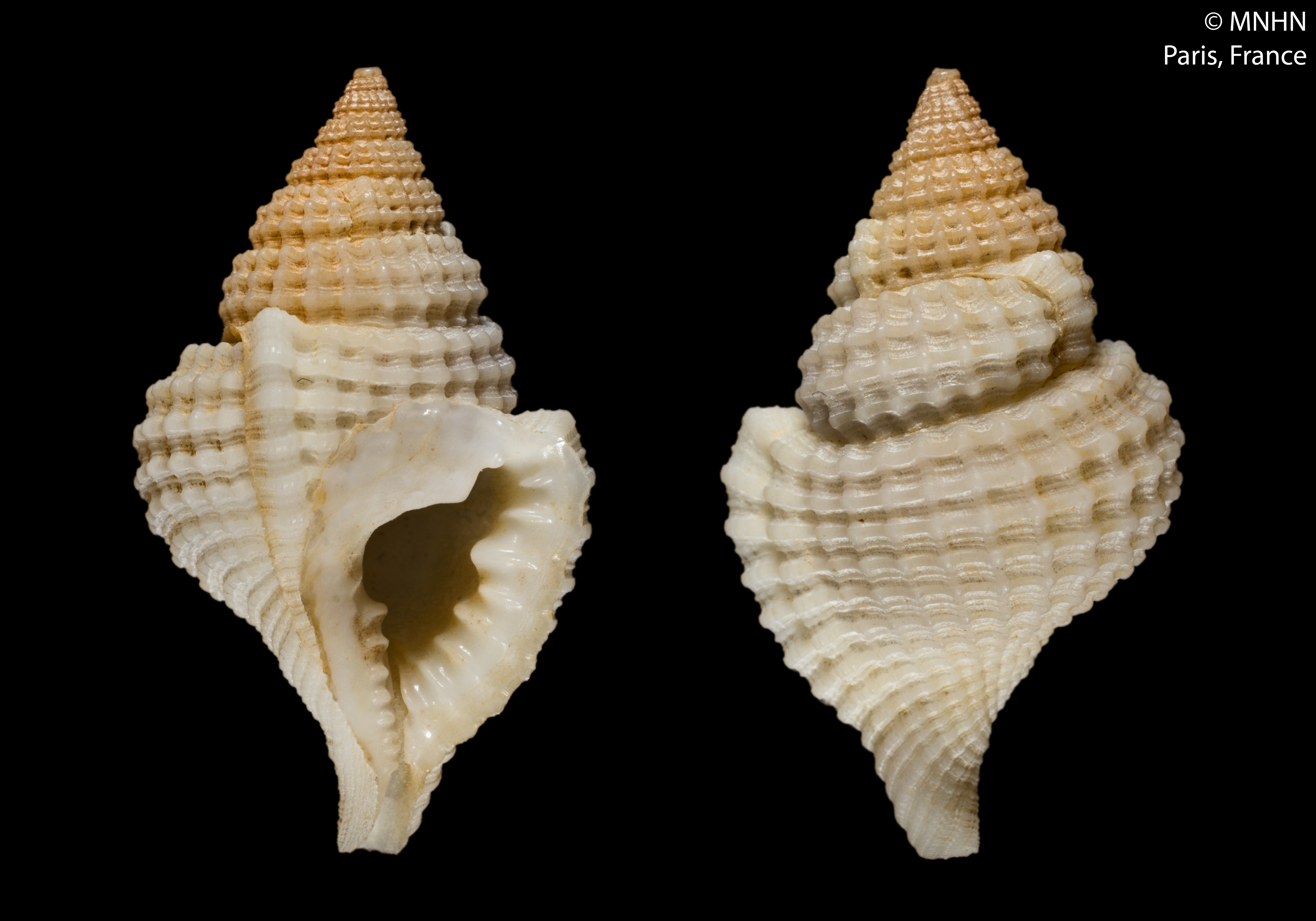
- Shell of Personopsis trigonaperta (holotype at the Museum national d'Histoire naturelle, Paris)

Scientific classification
- Kingdom: Animalia
- Phylum: Mollusca
- Class: Gastropoda
- Subclass: Caenogastropoda
- Order: Littorinimorpha
- Family: Personidae
- Genus: Personopsis
- Species: P. trigonaperta

Binomial name
- Personopsis trigonaperta Beu, 1998

= Personopsis trigonaperta =

Species of gastropod

Personopsis trigonaperta is a species of medium-sized sea snail, a marine gastropod mollusc in the family Personidae.

== Description ==
The length of the shell attains 25.9 mm.

== Distribution ==
This marine species occurs off New Caledonia and Vanuatu.
