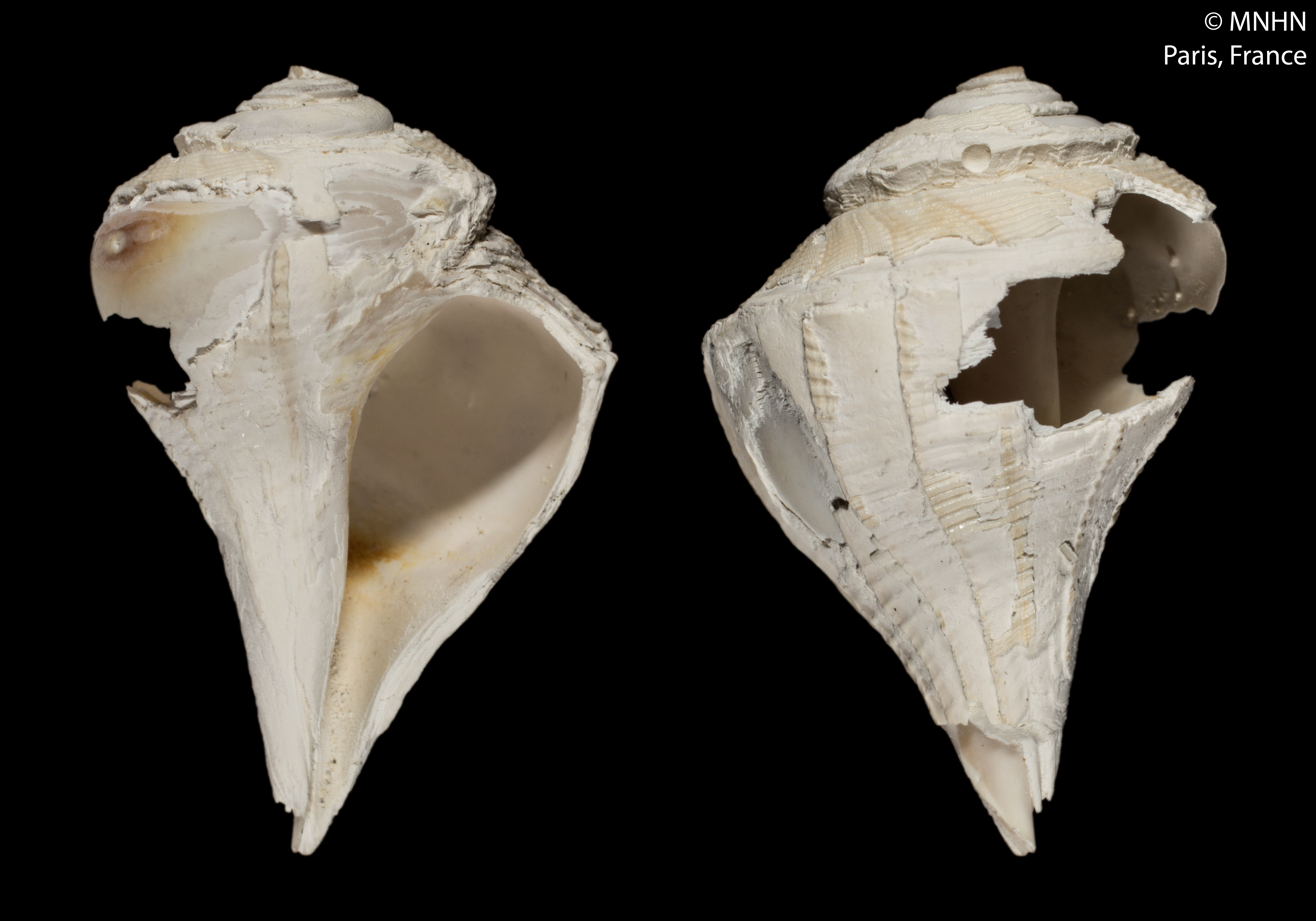
- Thalassocyon wareni

Scientific classification
- Kingdom: Animalia
- Phylum: Mollusca
- Class: Gastropoda
- Subclass: Caenogastropoda
- Order: Littorinimorpha
- Superfamily: Tonnoidea
- Family: Thalassocyonidae
- Genus: Thalassocyon; Barnard, 1960

Type species
- Thalassocyon bonus Barnard, 1960

= Thalassocyon =

Genus of gastropods

Thalassocyon is a genus of sea snails, marine gastropod molluscs in the family Thalassocyonidae.

== Taxonomy ==
Riedel (1995) elevated this genus to a family level (Thalassocyonidae), a vision not supported in Verhaeghe & Poppe (2000), nor in Bouchet, Rocroi et al. (2005)

== Distribution ==
This genus is found from South Africa to the Kermadec Islands and the North Island of New Zealand.

== Species ==
- Thalassocyon bonus Barnard, 1960
- Thalassocyon tui Dell, 1967
- Thalassocyon wareni F. Riedel, 2000
