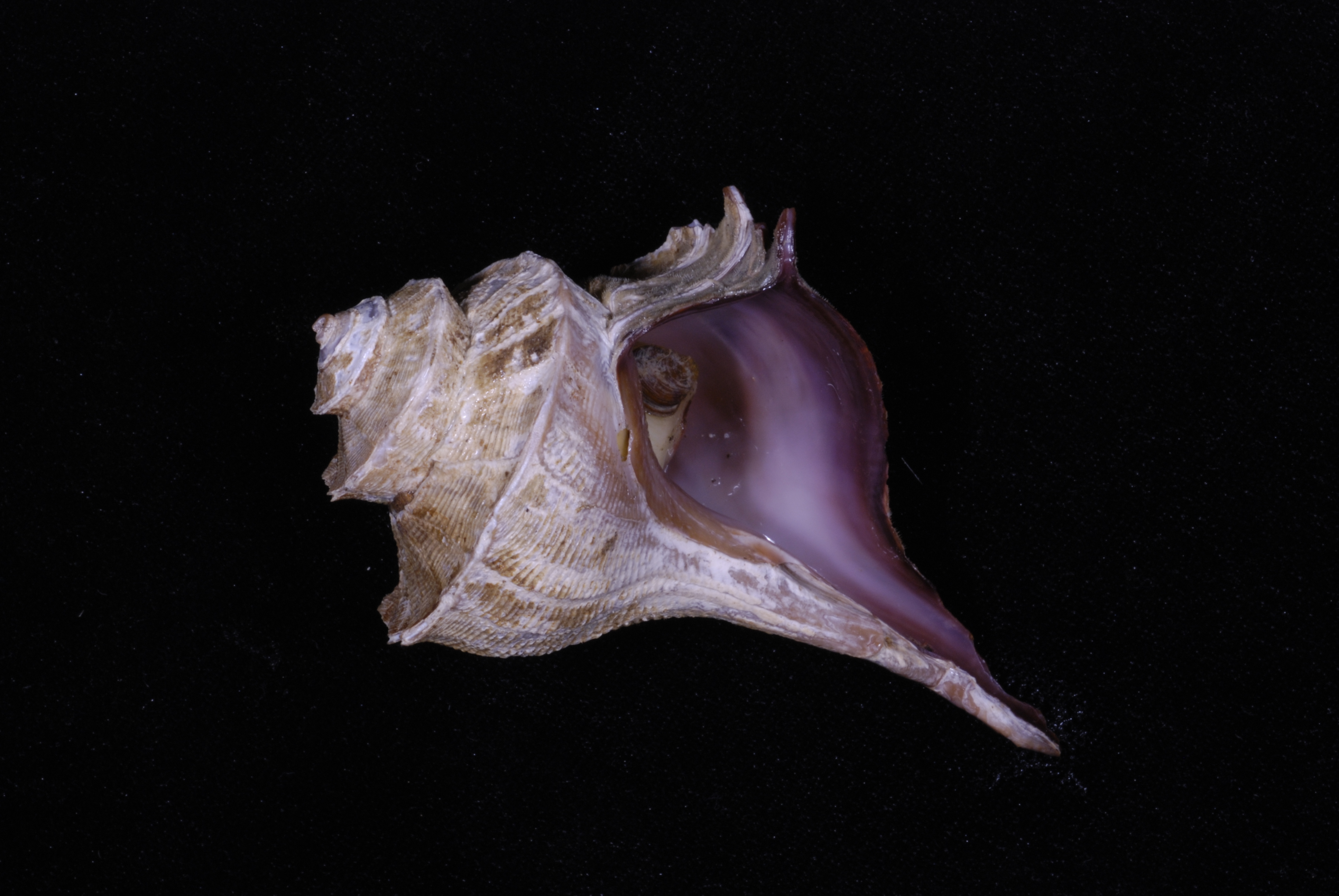
- Thalassocyon tui shell

Scientific classification
- Kingdom: Animalia
- Phylum: Mollusca
- Class: Gastropoda
- Subclass: Caenogastropoda
- Order: Littorinimorpha
- Family: Thalassocyonidae
- Genus: Thalassocyon
- Species: T. tui

Binomial name
- Thalassocyon tui Dell, 1967

= Thalassocyon tui =

Species of gastropod

Thalassocyon tui is a species of medium-sized sea snail, a marine gastropod mollusc in the family Thalassocyonidae.
