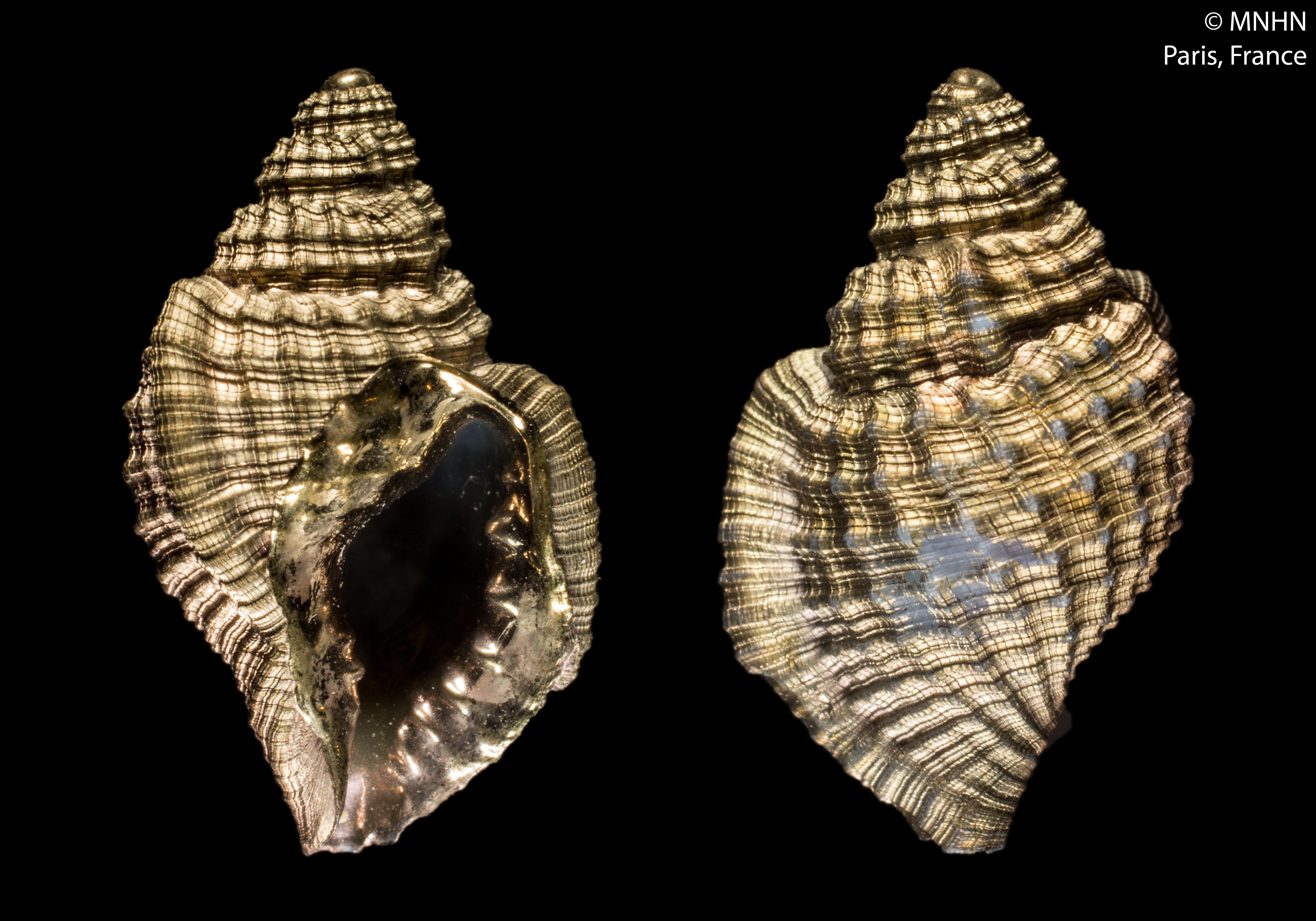
- Preserved specimen of D. pseudaphera

Scientific classification
- Kingdom: Animalia
- Phylum: Mollusca
- Class: Gastropoda
- Subclass: Caenogastropoda
- Order: Littorinimorpha
- Family: Thalassocyonidae
- Genus: Distorsionella
- Species: D. pseudaphera

Binomial name
- Distorsionella pseudaphera Beu, 1998

= Distorsionella pseudaphera =

Species of gastropod

Distorsionella pseudaphera is a species of medium-sized sea snail, a marine gastropod mollusk in the family Thalassocyonidae.
