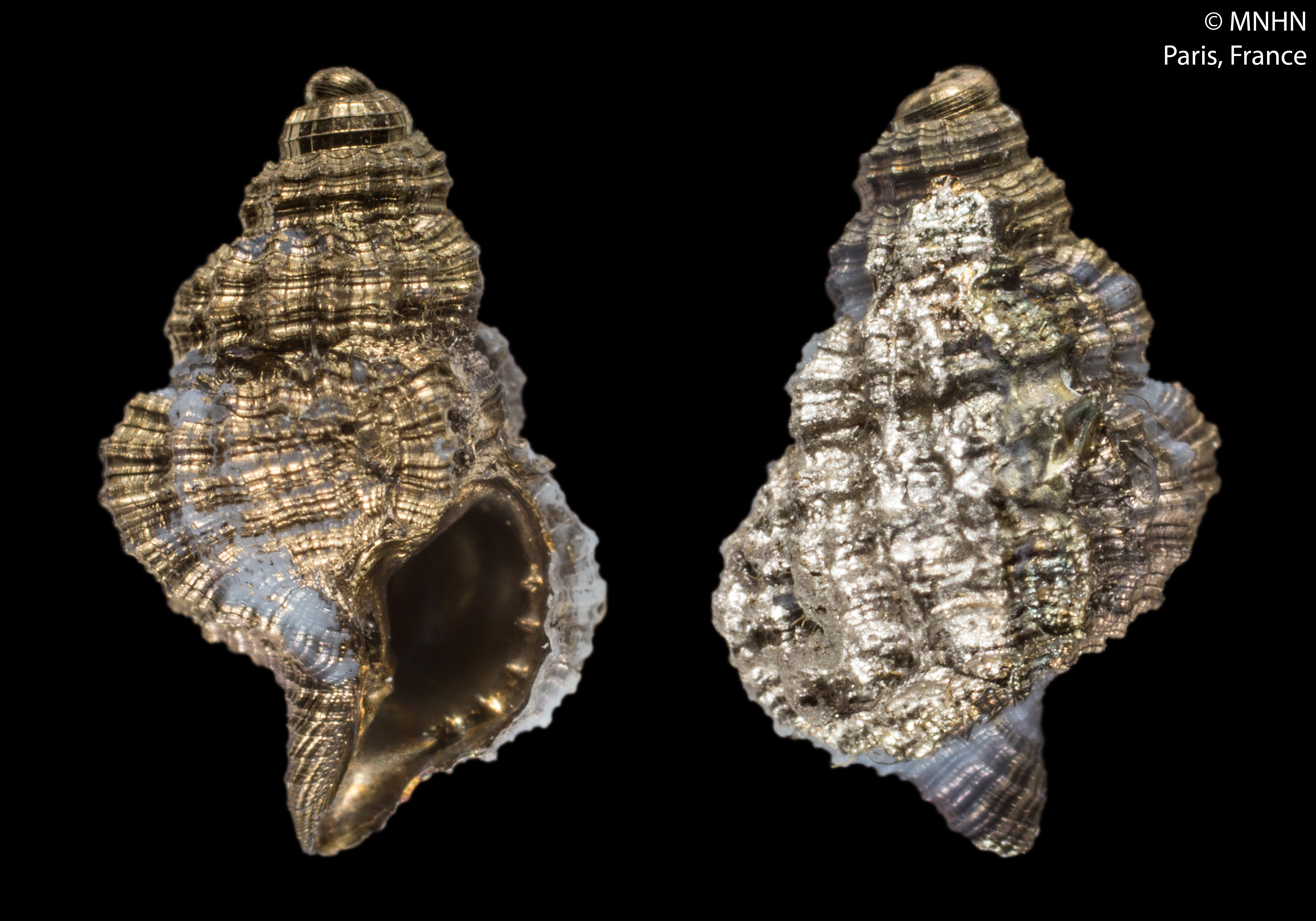
- Shell of Distorsionella lewisi (holotype at the MNHN, Paris)

Scientific classification
- Kingdom: Animalia
- Phylum: Mollusca
- Class: Gastropoda
- Subclass: Caenogastropoda
- Order: Littorinimorpha
- Family: Thalassocyonidae
- Genus: Distorsionella
- Species: D. lewisi

Binomial name
- Distorsionella lewisi (Beu, 1978)

Synonyms
- Distorsio (Distorsionella) lewisi Beu, 1978; Distorsionella beui Riedel, 2000; Personopsis ednafarinasi Parth, 2006

= Distorsionella lewisi =

Species of gastropod

Distorsionella lewisi is a species of medium-sized sea snail, a marine gastropod mollusk in the family Thalassocyonidae.

== Description ==
Shell size 45 mm.
