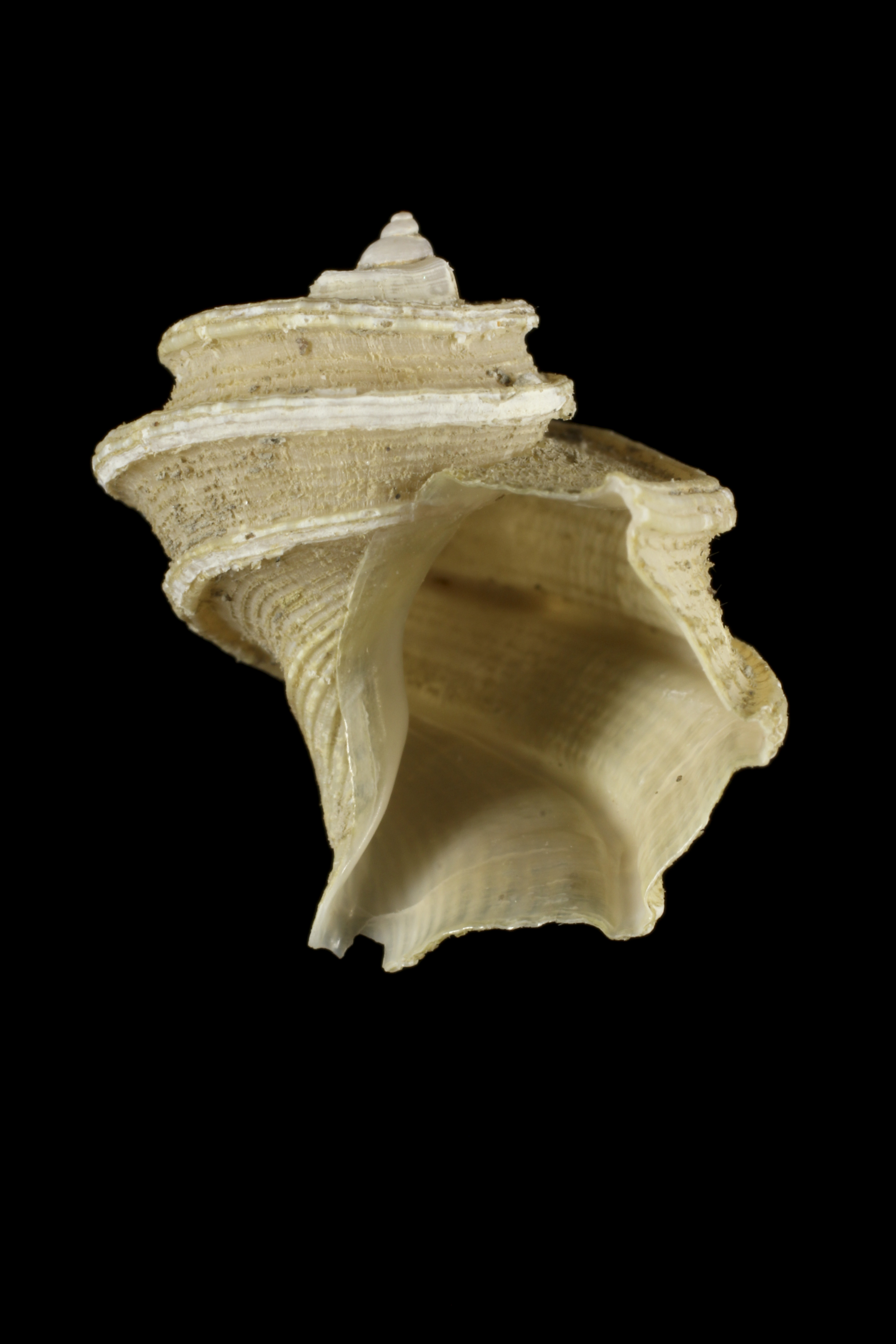
- Shell of Akibumia orientalis (specimen at MNHN, Paris)

Scientific classification
- Kingdom: Animalia
- Phylum: Mollusca
- Class: Gastropoda
- Subclass: Caenogastropoda
- Order: Littorinimorpha
- Superfamily: Tonnoidea
- Family: Laubierinidae; A. Warén & Ph. Bouchet, 1990

Genera
- See text

= Laubierinidae =

Family of gastropods

The Laubierinidae are a family of sea snails, marine gastropod molluscs in the clade Littorinimorpha.

== Taxonomy ==
The family includes the following genera:

- Akibumia Kuroda & Habe, 1959
- Laminilabrum Kuroda & Habe, 1961
- Laubierina A. Warén & Ph. Bouchet, 1990
- Pisanianura Rovereto, 1899

Genera brought into synonymy

- Anura Bellardi, 1873 † : synonym of Pisanianura Rovereto, 1899 (invalid: junior homonym of Anura Hodgson, 1841 [Aves]; Pisanianura is a replacement name)
- Kaiparanura Laws, 1944 †: synonym of Pisanianura Rovereto, 1899
- Nawenia Ladd, 1977 † : synonym of Pisanianura Rovereto, 1899
