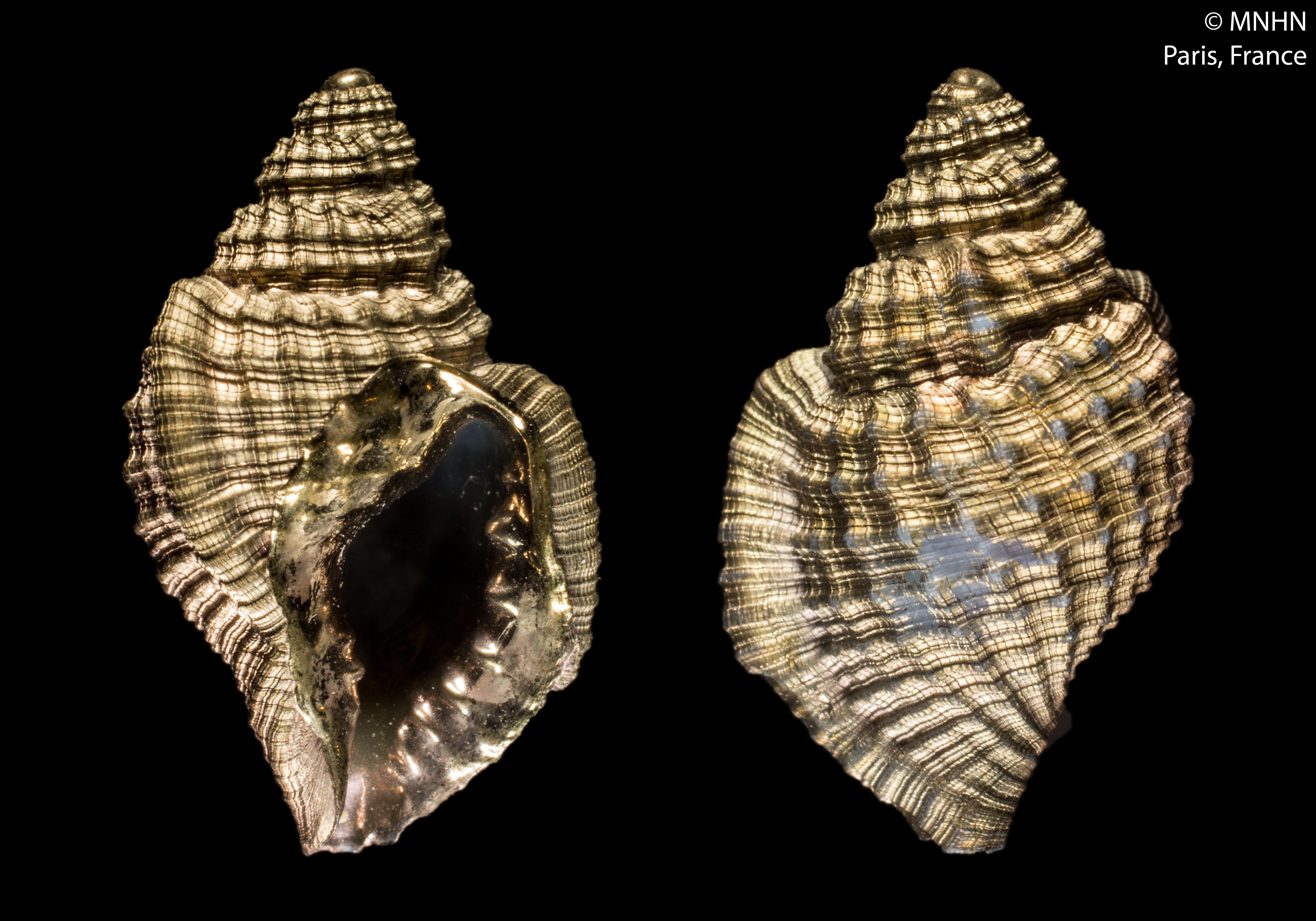
- Distorsionella pseudaphera, holotype; Museum national d'Histoire naturelle

Scientific classification
- Kingdom: Animalia
- Phylum: Mollusca
- Class: Gastropoda
- Subclass: Caenogastropoda
- Order: Littorinimorpha
- Family: Thalassocyonidae
- Genus: Distorsionella; Beu, 1978

= Distorsionella =

Genus of gastropods

Distorsionella is a genus of medium-sized sea snails, marine gastropod mollusks in the family Thalassocyonidae.

== Species ==
Species within the genus Distorsionella include:

- Distorsionella lewisi
- Distorsionella pseudaphera
