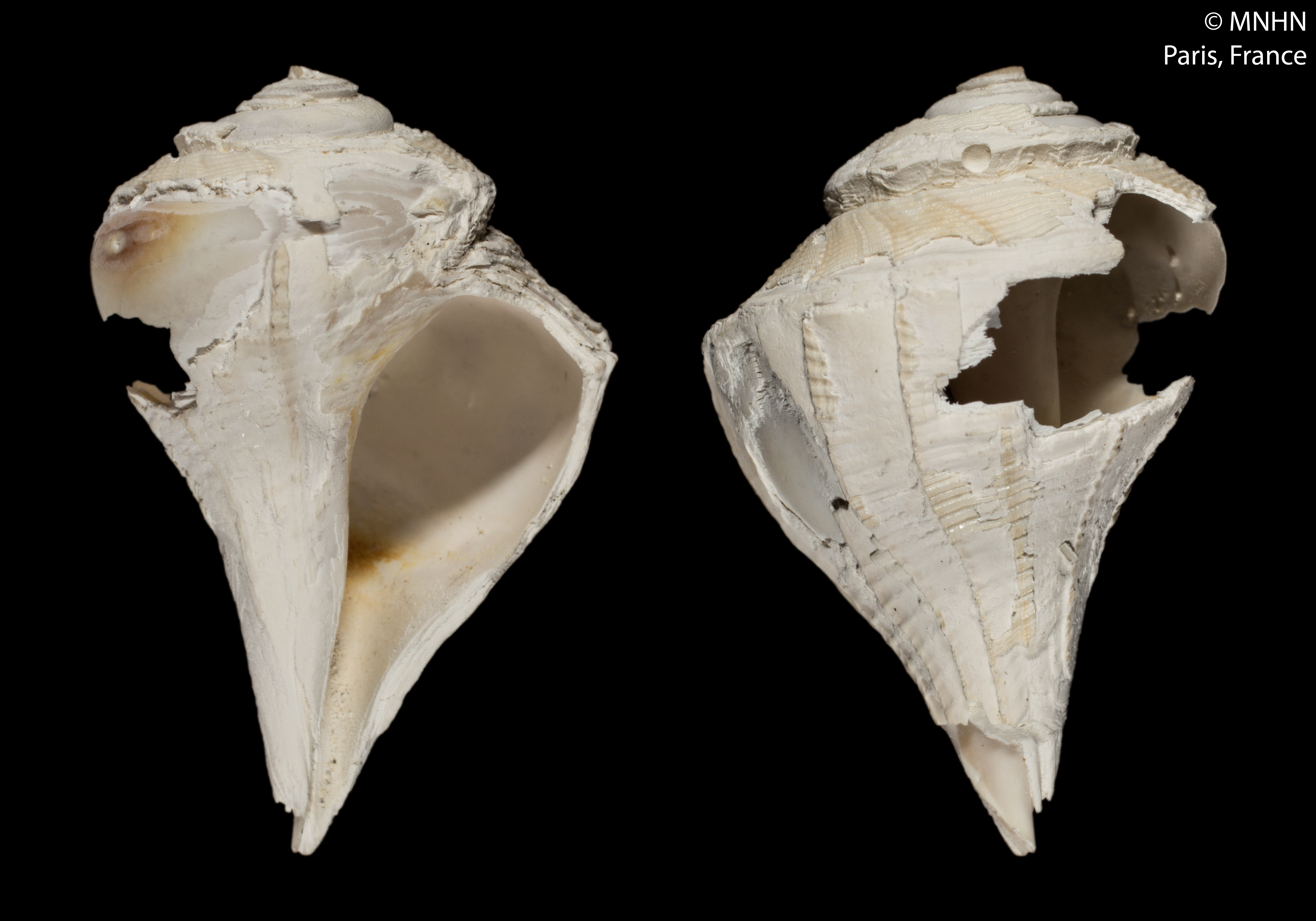
- Thalassocyon wareni

Scientific classification
- Kingdom: Animalia
- Phylum: Mollusca
- Class: Gastropoda
- Subclass: Caenogastropoda
- Order: Littorinimorpha
- Superfamily: Tonnoidea
- Family: Thalassocyonidae; F. Riedel, 1995

Genera
- Distorsionella; Thalassocyon

= Thalassocyonidae =

Family of gastropods

Thalassocyonidae is a family of sea snails in the superfamily Tonnoidea and the order Littorinimorpha.

== Genera ==
The only two genera within the family Thalassocyonidae are:

- Distorsionella Beu, 1978
- Thalassocyon Barnard, 1960
