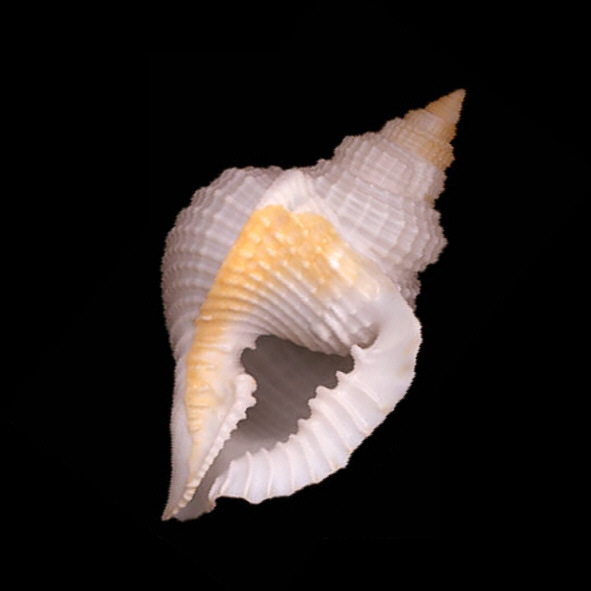
- Apertural view of a shell of Distorsio ventricosa

Scientific classification
- Kingdom: Animalia
- Phylum: Mollusca
- Class: Gastropoda
- Subclass: Caenogastropoda
- Order: Littorinimorpha
- Superfamily: Tonnoidea
- Family: Personidae; J.E. Gray, 1854

Genera
- See text

Synonyms
- Distorsioninae Beu, 1981; Personinae Gray, 1854 (original rank)

= Personidae =

Family of gastropods

The Personidae are a family of sea snails, marine gastropod molluscs in the order Littorinimorpha.

== Genera ==
- Distorsio Röding, 1798
- † Kotakaia Beu, 1988
- Personopsis Beu, 1988

Synonyms

- Calcarella Souleyet, 1850: synonym of Distorsio Röding, 1798
- Distorta Perry, 1811: synonym of Distorsio Röding, 1798
- Distortrix Link, 1807: synonym of Distorsio Röding, 1798 (objective synonym of Distorsio)
- Persona Montfort, 1810: synonym of Distorsio Röding, 1798 (objective synonym of Distoriso)
