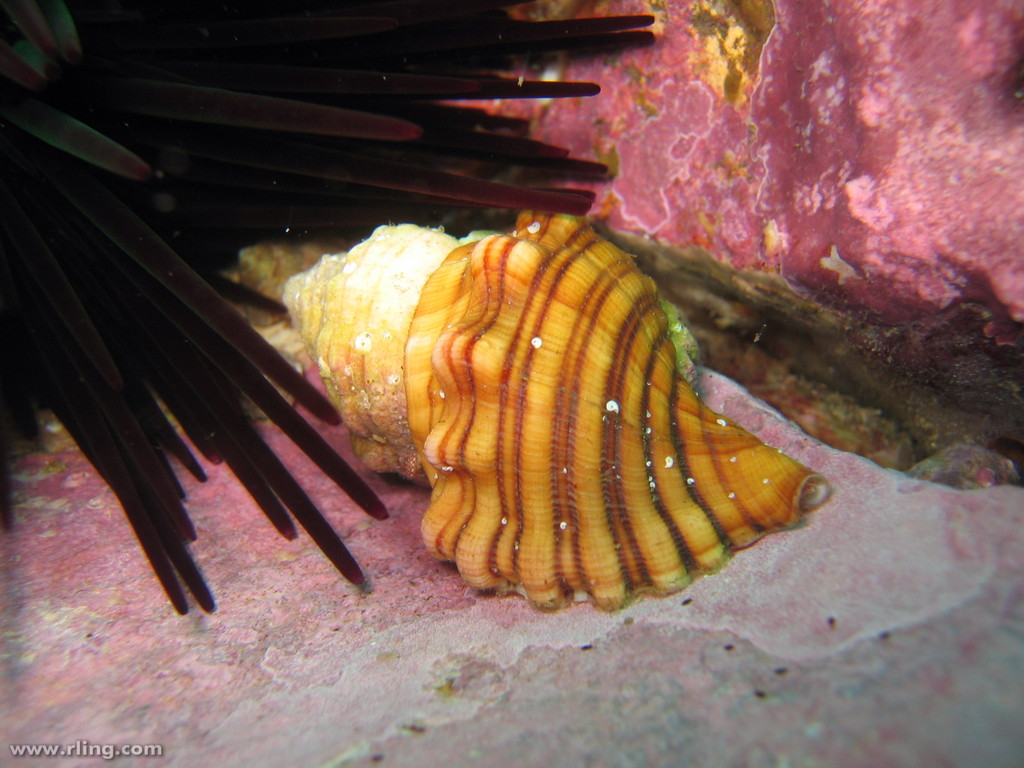
- A live but retracted individual of Cabestana spengleri, a species in the Ranellidae

Scientific classification
- Kingdom: Animalia
- Phylum: Mollusca
- Class: Gastropoda
- Subclass: Caenogastropoda
- Order: Littorinimorpha
- Superfamily: Tonnoidea; Suter, 1913 (1825)

Families
- See text

Synonyms
- Cassoidea (junior synonym)

= Tonnoidea =

Superfamily of gastropods

The Tonnoidea are a superfamily of sea snails, marine gastropod molluscs in the order Littorinimorpha. This superfamily includes many very large species.

== Nomenclature ==
Beu (1998, 2008) favours usage of Tonnoidea and Tonnidae rather than Cassoidea and Cassidae preferred by Riedel (1995). This is in agreement with the action of Thiele (1925) who placed Tonnidae and Cassidae under "stirps Tonnacea", therefore acting as first reviser under ICZN art. 24

== Families ==
Families within the superfamily Tonnoidea include:

- Bursidae, the frog shells
- Cassidae, the helmet shells and bonnet shells
- Charoniidae
- Cymatiidae
- Laubierinidae
- Personidae
- Ranellidae, the tritons
- Thalassocyonidae
- Tonnidae, the tun shells

Families brought into synonymy

- Aquillidae Pilsbry, 1904: synonym of Cymatiinae Iredale, 1913 (1854)
- Distorsioninae Beu, 1981: synonym of Personidae Gray, 1854
- Doliidae Latreille, 1825: synonym of Tonnidae Suter, 1913 (1825)
- Galeodoliidae Sacco, 1891: synonym of Tonnidae Suter, 1913 (1825)
- Lampusiidae Newton, 1891: synonym of Cymatiinae Iredale, 1913 (1854)
- Lotoriidae Harris, 1897: synonym of Cymatiinae Iredale, 1913 (1854)
- Macgillivrayiidae H. Adams & A. Adams, 1854: synonym of Tonnidae Suter, 1913 (1825)
- Nyctilochidae Dall, 1912: synonym of Cymatiinae Iredale, 1913 (1854)
- Oocorythidae P. Fischer, 1885: synonym of Cassidae Latreille, 1825
- Personinae Gray, 1854: synonym of Personidae Gray, 1854 (original rank)
- Septidae Dall & Simpson, 1901: synonym of Cymatiinae Iredale, 1913 (1854)
- Simpulidae Dautzenberg, 1900: synonym of Cymatiinae Iredale, 1913 (1854)
- Tritoniidae H. Adams & A. Adams, 1853: synonym of Ranellidae Gray, 1854 (Invalid: type genus a junior homonym of Tritonium O.F. Müller, 1776. Also homonym of Tritoniidae Lamarck, 1809 based on Tritonia Cuvier, 1797)
