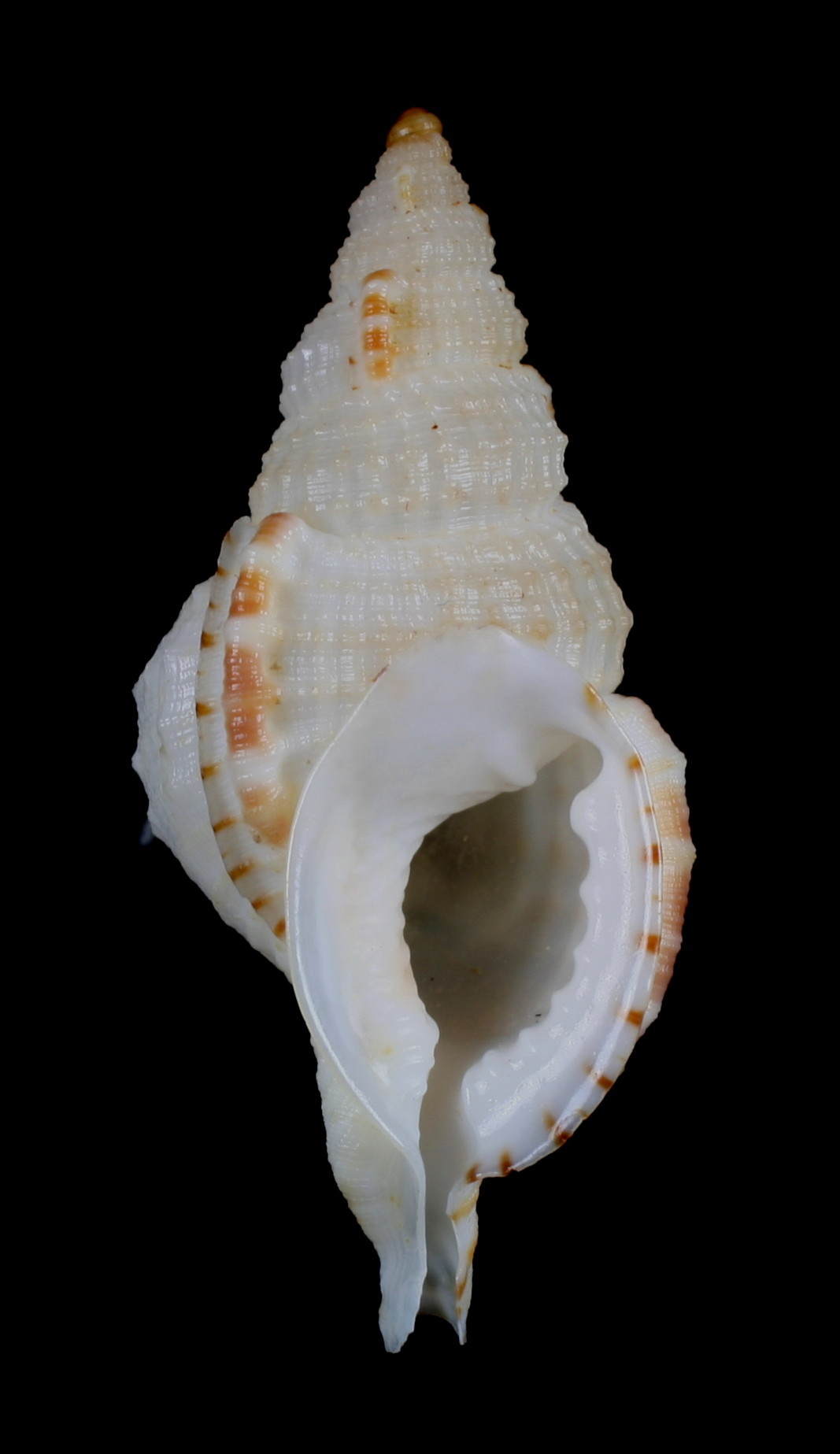
- Sassia semitorta shell

Scientific classification
- Kingdom: Animalia
- Phylum: Mollusca
- Class: Gastropoda
- Subclass: Caenogastropoda
- Order: Littorinimorpha
- Superfamily: Tonnoidea
- Family: Cymatiidae
- Genus: Sassia; Bellardi, 1873

Synonyms
- † Charonia (Sassia) Bellardi, 1873; Eutritonium (Sassia) Bellardi, 1873; Lampusia (Sassia) Bellardi, 1873; † Monocirsus Cossmann, 1889 ·; Phanozesta Iredale, 1936; Sassoia Rovereto, 1900 (unjustified emendation of Sassia); Triton (Sassia) Bellardi, 1873

= Sassia =

Genus of gastropods

Sassia is a genus of sea snails, marine gastropod molluscs in the family Cymatiidae.

== Species ==
The genus Sassia contains the following species:

- † Sassia antiqua (Deshayes, 1865)
- † Sassia apenninica (Sassi, 1827)
- † Sassia bernayi (Cossmann, 1889)
- † Sassia bicincta (Deshayes, 1835)
- † Sassia carinulata (Cossmann, 1889)
- † Sassia colubrina (Lamarck, 1803)
- † Sassia cuneata (Cossmann, 1885)
- † Sassia cyphoides (Finlay, 1924)
- † Sassia decagonia (Finlay, 1924)
- † Sassia delafossei (Rouault, 1850)
- † Sassia dumortieri (Baudon, 1853)
- † Sassia faxense (Ravn, 1933)
- † Sassia formosa (Deshayes, 1865)
- † Sassia foveolata (Sandberger, 1860)
- † Sassia lejeunii (Melleville, 1843)
- † Sassia maoria (Finlay, 1924)
- Sassia melpangi Harasewych & Beu, 2007
- Sassia midwayensis (Habe & Okutani, 1968)
- Sassia minima (Hutton, 1873)
- Sassia mozambicana R. Aiken & Seccombe, 2019
- † Sassia multigranifera (Deshayes, 1835)
- Sassia nassariformis (G. B. Sowerby III, 1902)
- † Sassia neozelanica (P. Marshall & R. Murdoch, 1923)
- † Sassia nodularia (Lamarck, 1803)
- † Sassia pahaoaensis (Vella, 1954)
- † Sassia pusulosa (Marwick, 1965)
- † Sassia raulini (Cossmann & Peyrot, 1924)
- Sassia remensa (Iredale, 1936)
- † Sassia reticulosa (Deshayes, 1835)
- † Sassia scabriuscula (Deshayes, 1865)
- Sassia semitorta (Kuroda & Habe, 1961)
- † Sassia striatula (Lamarck, 1803)
- † Sassia tortirostris (Tate, 1888)
- † Sassia tuberculifera (Bronn, 1831)
- Sassia zealta (Laws, 1939)

Species brought into synonymy

- † Sassia arthritica (Powell & Bartrum, 1929): synonym of † Proxicharonia arthritica (Powell & Bartrum, 1929)
- Sassia bassi - synonym: Austrotriton bassi (Angas, 1869)
- Sassia epitrema - synonym: Austrotriton epitrema (Tenison Woods, 1877)
- Sassia garrardi (Beu, 1970): synonym of Austrotriton garrardi Beu, 1970
- Sassia jobbernsi (L. C. King, 1933) †: synonym of Sassia kampyla (R. B. Watson, 1883): synonym of Cymatona kampyla (R. B. Watson, 1883)
- Sassia kampyla (R. B. Watson, 1883) - synonym: Cymatona kampyla (Watson, 1883)
- Sassia lewisi Harasewych & Petuch, 1980 - synonym: Personella lewisi (Harasewych & Petuch, 1980)
- Sassia lindneri Parth, 1992: synonym of Austrosassia parkinsonia (Perry, 1811)
- Sassia marshalli Beu, 1978: synonym of Sassia remensa (Iredale, 1936)
- Sassia mimetica (Tate, 1893) - synonym: Austrotriton mimetica (Tate, 1893)
- Sassia palmeri (Powell, 1967)- synonym: Proxicharonia palmeri (Powell, 1967)
- Sassia parkinsonia (Perry, 1811) - synonym: Austrosassia parkinsonia (Perry, 1811)
- Sassia petulans (Hedley & May, 1908): synonym of Austrotriton petulans (Hedley & May, 1908)
- Sassia philomelae (R. B. Watson, 1881): synonym of Cymatona philomelae (R. B. Watson, 1881)
- Sassia planocincta Wrigley, 1932 †: synonym of Pseudosassia planocincta (Wrigley, 1932) †
- Sassia ponderi Beu, 1987: synonym of Austrosassia ponderi (Beu, 1987)
- Sassia subdistorta (Lamarck, 1822) synonym: Austrotriton subdistortus (Lamarck, 1822)
- Sassia turrita (Eichwald, 1830) †: synonym of Pseudosassia turrita (Eichwald, 1830) †
