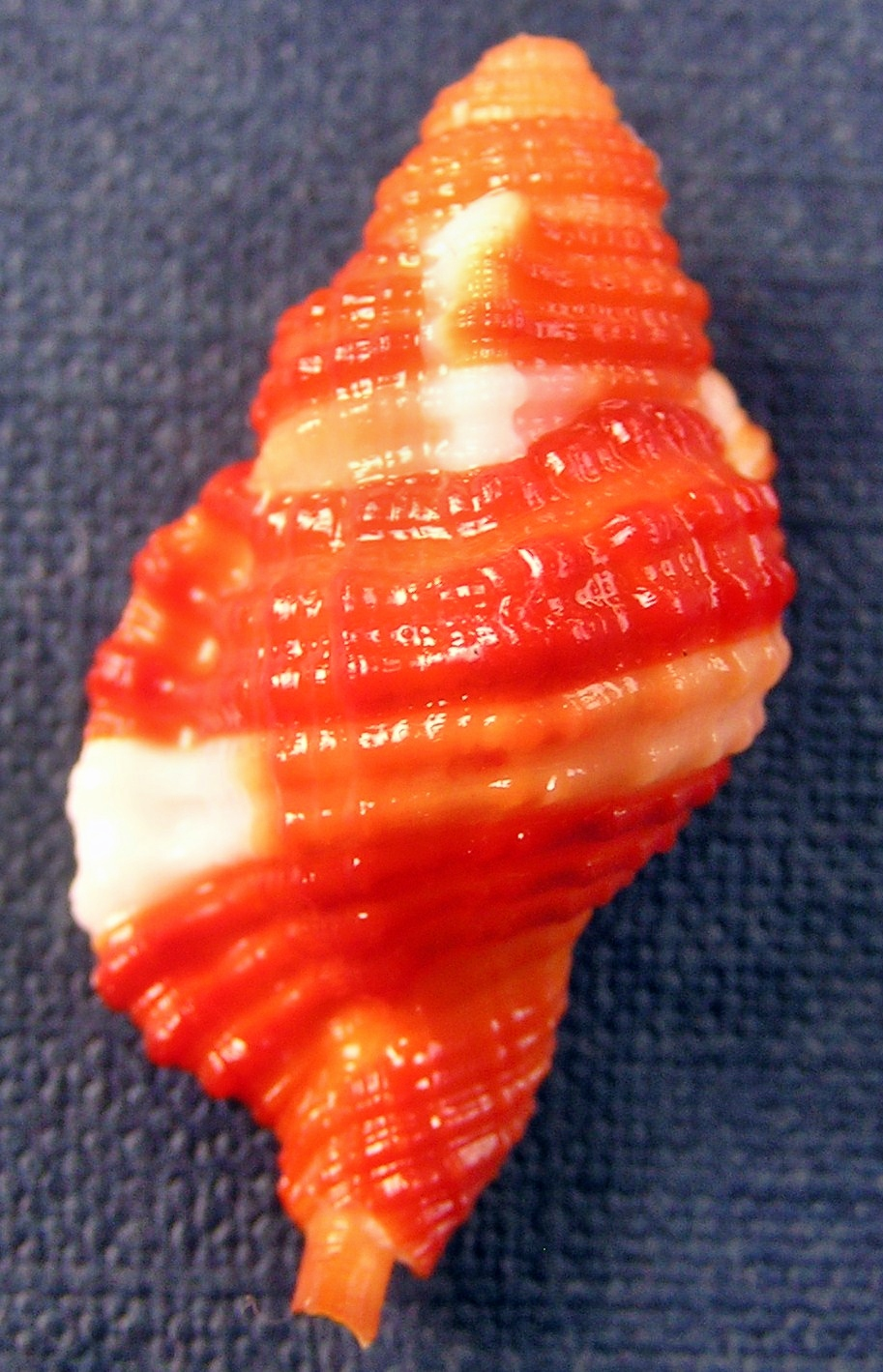
- shell of Septa bibbeyi

Scientific classification
- Kingdom: Animalia
- Phylum: Mollusca
- Class: Gastropoda
- Subclass: Caenogastropoda
- Order: Littorinimorpha
- Family: Cymatiidae
- Genus: Septa; Perry, 1810

Type species
- Septa scarlatina Perry, 1810

Synonyms
- Cymatium (Septa) Perry, 1810; Cymatium (Simpulum) Mörch, 1852; Eutriton (Simpulum) Mörch, 1852; Lampusia (Simpulum) Mörch, 1852; Simpulum Mørch, 1853; Triton (Simpulum) Mörch, 1852; Tritonium (Simpulum) Mörch, 1852

= Septa (gastropod) =

Genus of gastropods

Septa is a genus of small to large predatory sea snails, marine gastropod mollusks in the family Cymatiidae.

It was previously considered as a subgenus of Cymatium.

== General characteristics ==
(Original description) The shell is univalve and spirally coiled, bearing membranous septa or partitions arranged alternately and oppositely along both the body whorl and the spire. These septa differ in colour from the remainder of the shell and are faintly tuberculate.

== Species ==
According to the World Register of Marine Species (WoRMS) the following species with valid names are included within the genus Septa:

- Septa beui (Garcia-Talavera, 1985)
- Septa bibbeyi (Beu, 1987)
- Septa closeli (Beu, 1987)
- † Septa dharmai (Beu, 2005)
- Septa flaveola (Röding, 1798)
- Septa hepatica (Röding, 1798)
- † Septa landaui Beu, 2010
- Septa marerubrum (Garcia-Talavera, 1985)
- Septa mixta (Arthur & Garcia-Talavera, 1990)
- Septa occidentalis (Mörch, 1877)
- † Septa ogygia (Woodring, 1959)
- Septa peasei (Beu, 1987)
- Septa rubecula (Linnaeus, 1758)

Synonyms

- Septa blacketi Iredale, 1936: synonym of Septa occidentalis (Mörch, 1877)
- Septa englishi Newton, 1905 †: synonym of Charonia lampas (Linnaeus, 1758)
- Septa exarata (Reeve, 1844): synonym of Monoplex exaratus (Reeve, 1844)
- † Septa gembacana (K. Martin, 1884): synonym of Monoplex pilearis (Linnaeus, 1758)
- Septa gemmata is a synonym for Monoplex gemmatus (Reeve, 1844)
- Septa parkinsonia Perry, 1811: synonym of Sassia parkinsonia (Perry, 1811): synonym of Austrosassia parkinsonia (Perry, 1811) (original combination)
- Septa parthenopea (Salis Marschlins, 1793): synonym of Monoplex parthenopeus (Salis Marschlins, 1793)
- Septa petulans Hedley & May, 1908: synonym of Sassia petulans (Hedley & May, 1908): synonym of Austrotriton petulans (Hedley & May, 1908) (original combination)
- Septa rubicunda Perry, 1811: synonym of Charonia lampas (Linnaeus, 1758)
- Septa scarlatina Perry, 1810: synonym of Septa rubecula (Linnaeus, 1758)
- Septa spengleri Perry, 1811: synonym of Cabestana spengleri (Perry, 1811) (original combination)
- † Septa tjaringinensis (K. Martin, 1899): synonym of † Monoplex tjaringinensis (K. Martin, 1899)
- Septa triangularis Perry, 1811: synonym of Lotoria triangularis (Perry, 1811) (original combination)
- Septa tritonia Perry, 1810: synonym of Charonia tritonis (Linnaeus, 1758)
