= Septa (disambiguation) =

SEPTA is a public transportation authority serving Greater Philadelphia, United States.

Septa may refer to:

- Septa (gastropod), a gastropod genus in the family Ranellidae
- Septa, the plural of septum, in anatomy, a wall of tissue dividing a cavity (e.g., in the nose)
- Septa, plural for septum (coral), the stony ridges forming part of the corallites of corals
- Special Education PTA (SEPTA), a type of parent–teacher association (PTA) focused on special education

== See also ==
- Septa Unella, a fictional character in A Song of Ice and Fire and its TV adaptation, Game Of Thrones
