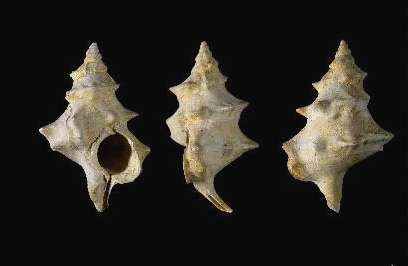
- Shell of † Austrotriton radialis (specimen at MNHN, Paris)

Scientific classification
- Kingdom: Animalia
- Phylum: Mollusca
- Class: Gastropoda
- Subclass: Caenogastropoda
- Order: Littorinimorpha
- Family: Cymatiidae
- Genus: Austrotriton; Cossmann, 1903

Synonyms
- Charoniella Thiele, 1929; Negyrina Iredale, 1929; † Tritonium (Austrotriton) Cossmann, 1903 (original rank)

= Austrotriton =

Genus of gastropods

Austrotriton is a genus of medium-sized sea snails, a marine gastropod mollusc in the family Cymatiidae.

== Species ==
The genus contains the following species:

- Austrotriton bassi (Angas, 1869)
- Austrotriton epitrema (Tenison Woods, 1877)
- Austrotriton garrardi Beu, 1970
- Austrotriton mimetica (Tate, 1893)
- Austrotriton petulans (Hedley & May, 1908)
- † Austrotriton radialis (Tate, 1888)
- Austrotriton subdistortus (Lamarck, 1822)

Species brought into synonymy

- † Austrotriton cyphoides Finlay, 1924: synonym of † Sassia cyphoides (Finlay, 1924)
- † Austrotriton maorium Finlay, 1924: synonym of † Sassia minima (Hutton, 1873)
- † Austrotriton morgani Marwick, 1931: synonym of † Sassia tortirostris (Tate, 1888)
- † Austrotriton neozelanica P. Marshall & Murdoch, 1923: synonym of † Sassia neozelanica (P. Marshall & R. Murdoch, 1923)
- Austrotriton parkinsonius (Perry, 1811): synonym of Austrosassia parkinsonia (Perry, 1811)
