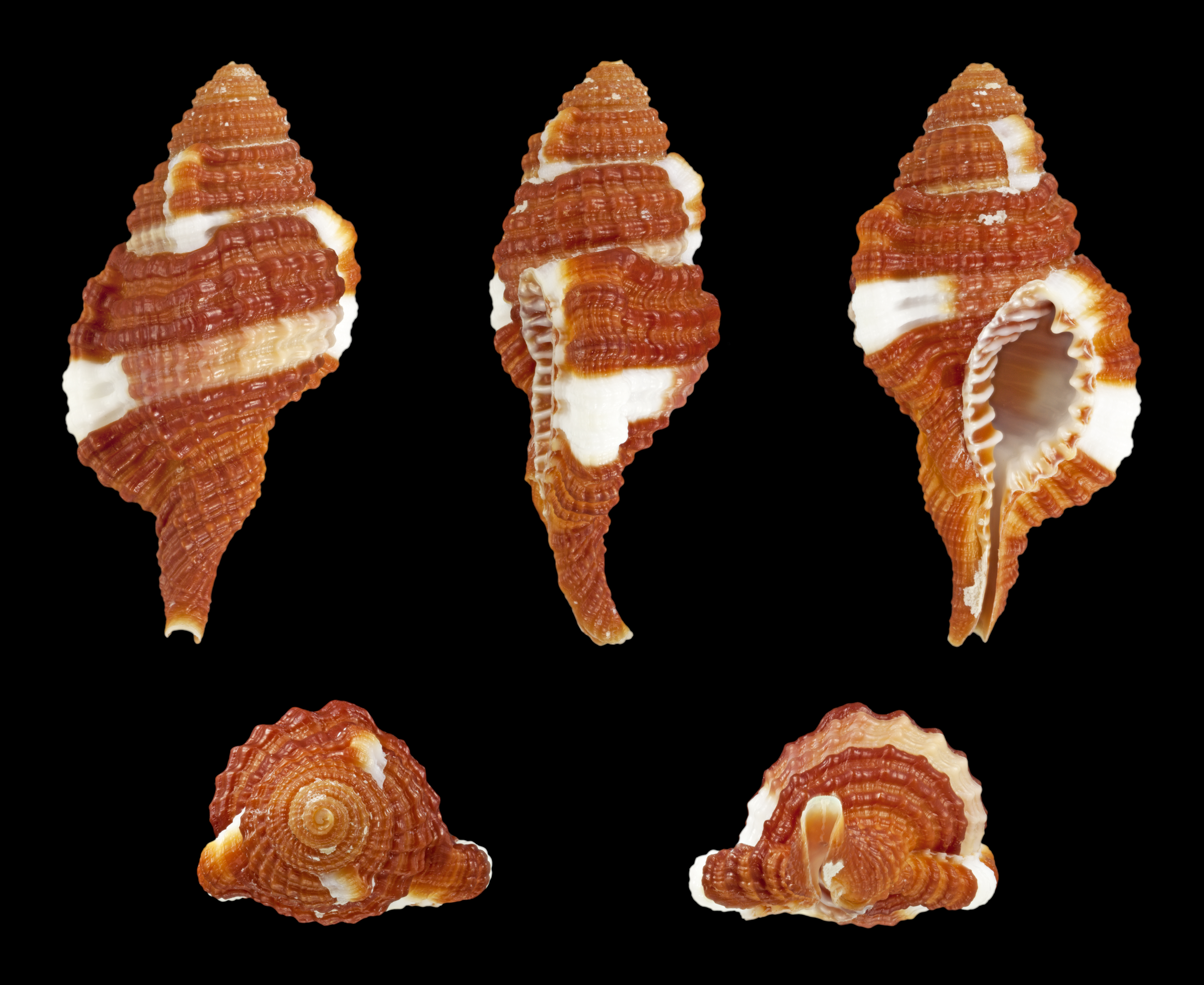
- Septa bibbeyi

Scientific classification
- Kingdom: Animalia
- Phylum: Mollusca
- Class: Gastropoda
- Subclass: Caenogastropoda
- Order: Littorinimorpha
- Family: Cymatiidae
- Genus: Septa
- Species: S. bibbeyi

Binomial name
- Septa bibbeyi (Beu, 1987)

Synonyms
- Cymatium (Septa) bibbeyi Beu, 1987

= Septa bibbeyi =

Species of gastropod

Septa bibbeyi is a species of predatory sea snail, a marine gastropod mollusk in the family Cymatiidae.

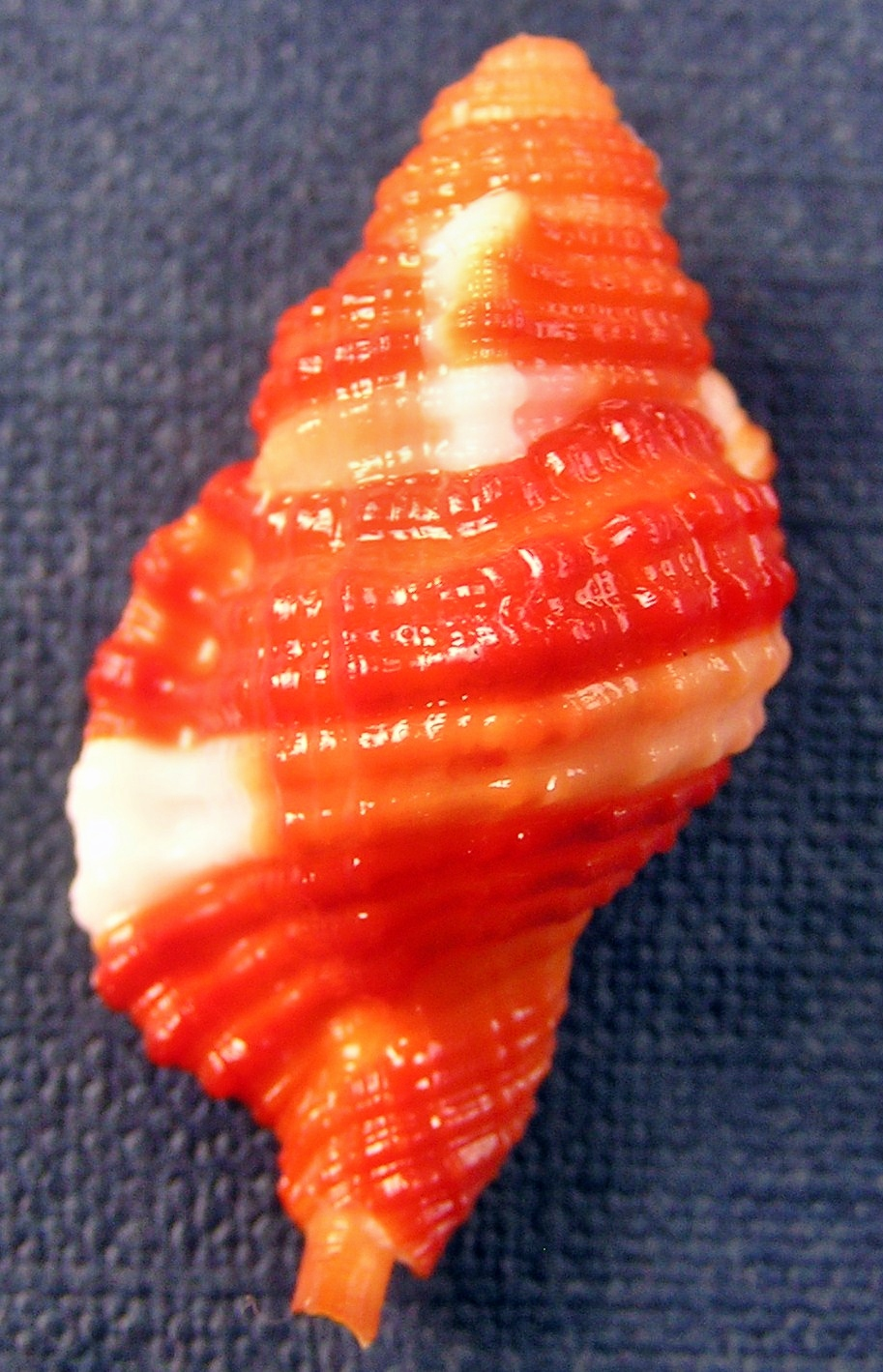
Septa bibbeyi, abapertural view
