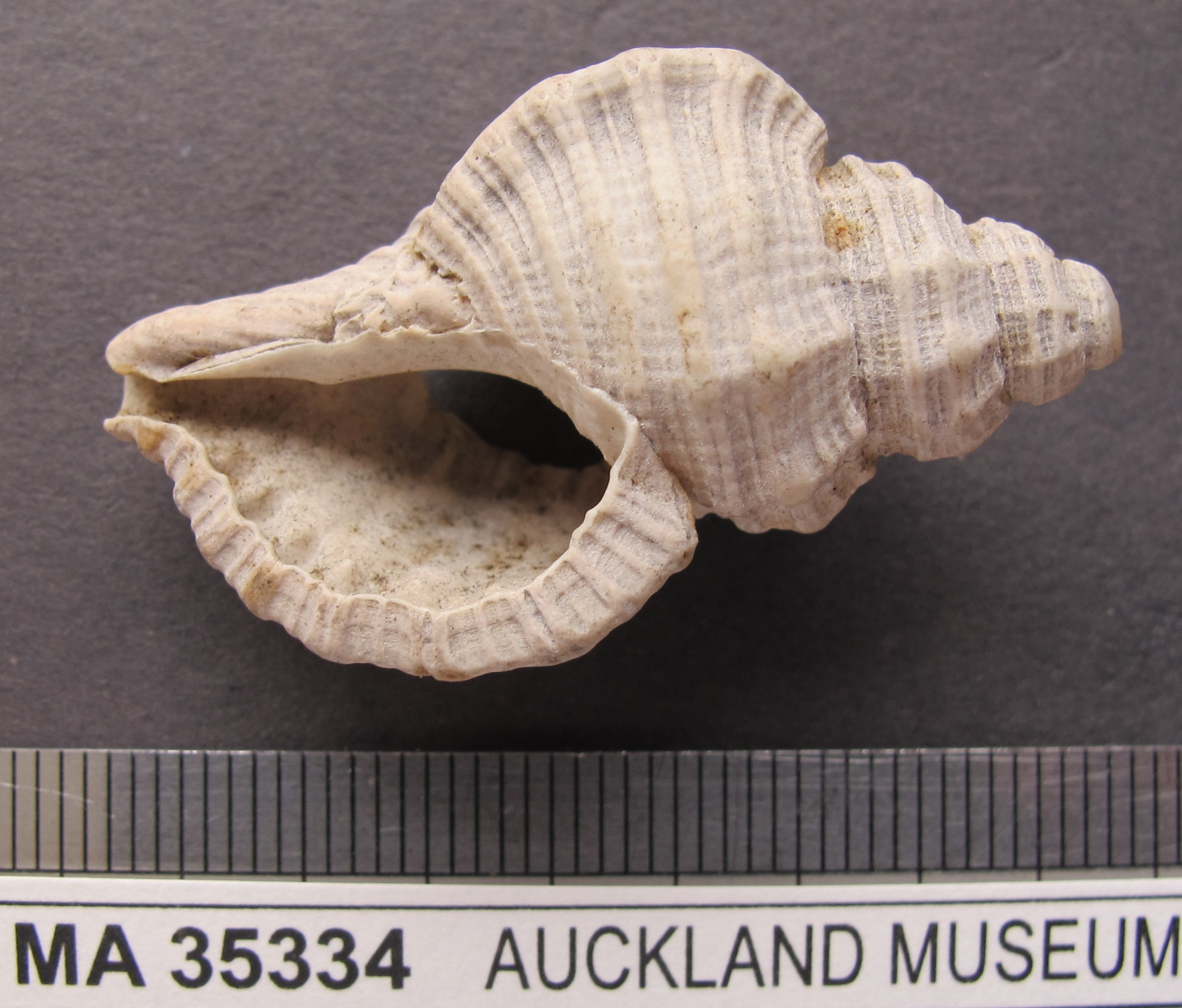
- Shell of Cabestana tabulata (specimen at the Auckland Museum)

Scientific classification
- Kingdom: Animalia
- Phylum: Mollusca
- Class: Gastropoda
- Subclass: Caenogastropoda
- Order: Littorinimorpha
- Family: Cymatiidae
- Genus: Cabestana
- Species: C. tabulata

Binomial name
- Cabestana tabulata (Menke, 1843)

Synonyms
- Cabestana (Cymatilesta) otagoensis Powell, 1954; † Cabestana debelior Finlay, 1930; † Cabestana manawatuna C. A. Fleming, 1943; Cabestana otagoensis Powell, 1954; Cabestana tabulata manawatuna C. A. Fleming, 1943; Cabestana waterhousei (A. Adams & Angas, 1864); Cabestana waterhousei segregata Powell, 1933; Cymatilesta waterhousei (A. Adams & Angas, 1864); Cymatilesta waterhousei tepida Iredale, 1936; Cymatium waterhousei (A. Adams & Angas, 1864); Cymatium waterhousei frigidulum Iredale, 1929; Triton tabulata Menke, 1843; Triton waterhousei A. Adams & Angas, 1864; Tritonium tabulatum Menke, 1843 superseded combination (basionym)

= Cabestana tabulata =

Species of gastropod

Cabestana tabulata, the shouldered triton or Waterhouse's Rock Whelk, is a species of predatory sea snail, a marine gastropod mollusk in the family Cymatiidae.

== Description ==
Cabestana tabulata is a type of seashell, which can be up to 130mm, but is usually 40-100 cm in length. The shell has 7 to 10 strong, paired spiral ribs and smaller, weaker intermediate riblets, and nodules on the shoulder. The Outer lip is expanded and thickened. It is yellow-brown in color.

== Distribution ==
This species occurs in the seas along Southern Australia and Northern New Zealand and is found amongst seaweed and rocks, intertidally and subtidally.
