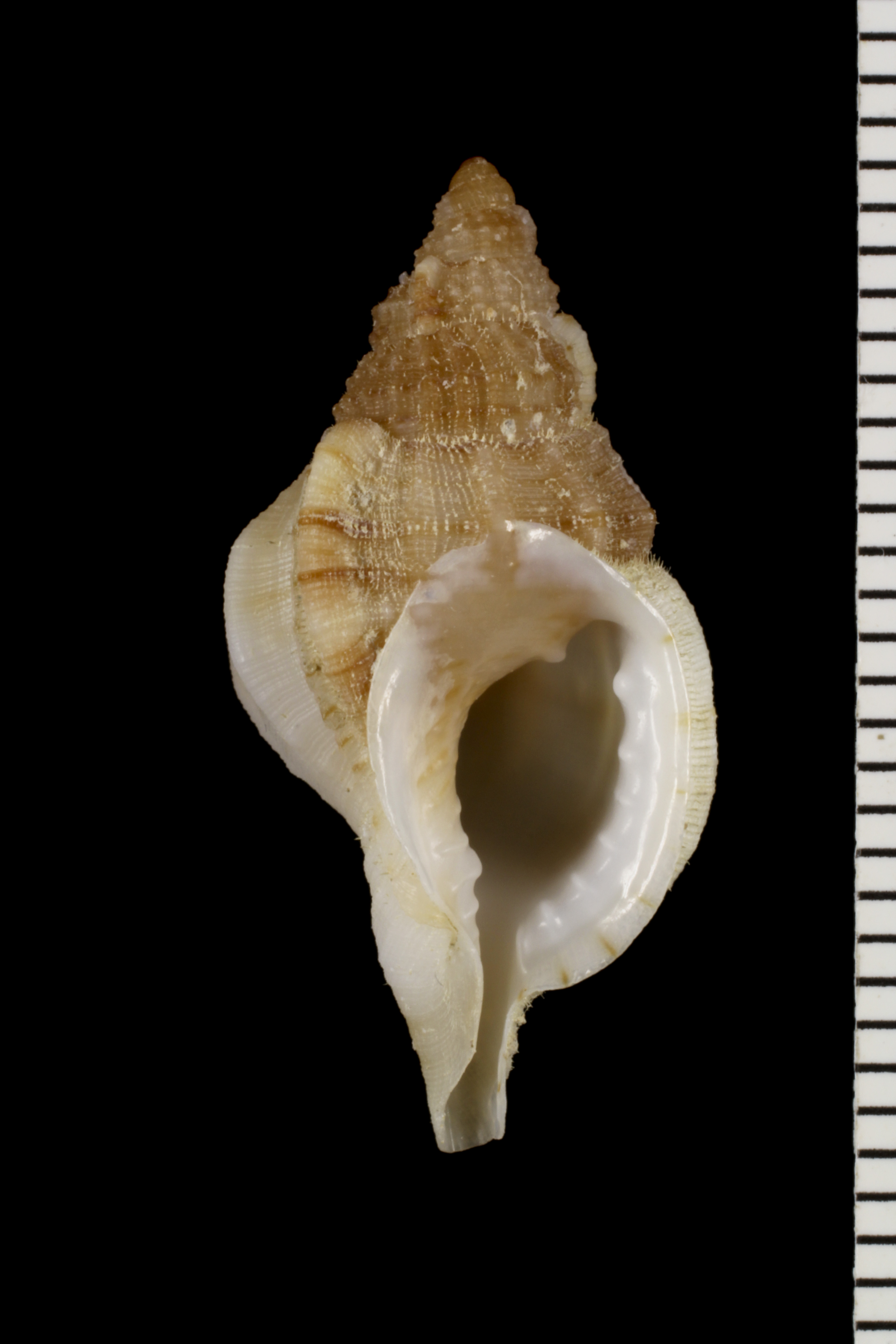
- Shell of Sassia remensa (specimen at MNHN, Paris)

Scientific classification
- Kingdom: Animalia
- Phylum: Mollusca
- Class: Gastropoda
- Subclass: Caenogastropoda
- Order: Littorinimorpha
- Superfamily: Tonnoidea
- Family: Cymatiidae
- Genus: Sassia
- Species: S. remensa

Binomial name
- Sassia remensa (Iredale, 1936)

Synonyms
- Phanozesta remensa Iredale, 1936; Sassia marshalli Beu, 1978

= Sassia remensa =

Species of gastropod

Sassia remensa is a species of predatory sea snail, a marine gastropod mollusk in the family Cymatiidae.

== Distribution ==
This species occurs in the Australian part of the Tasman Sea; also of New Caledonia
