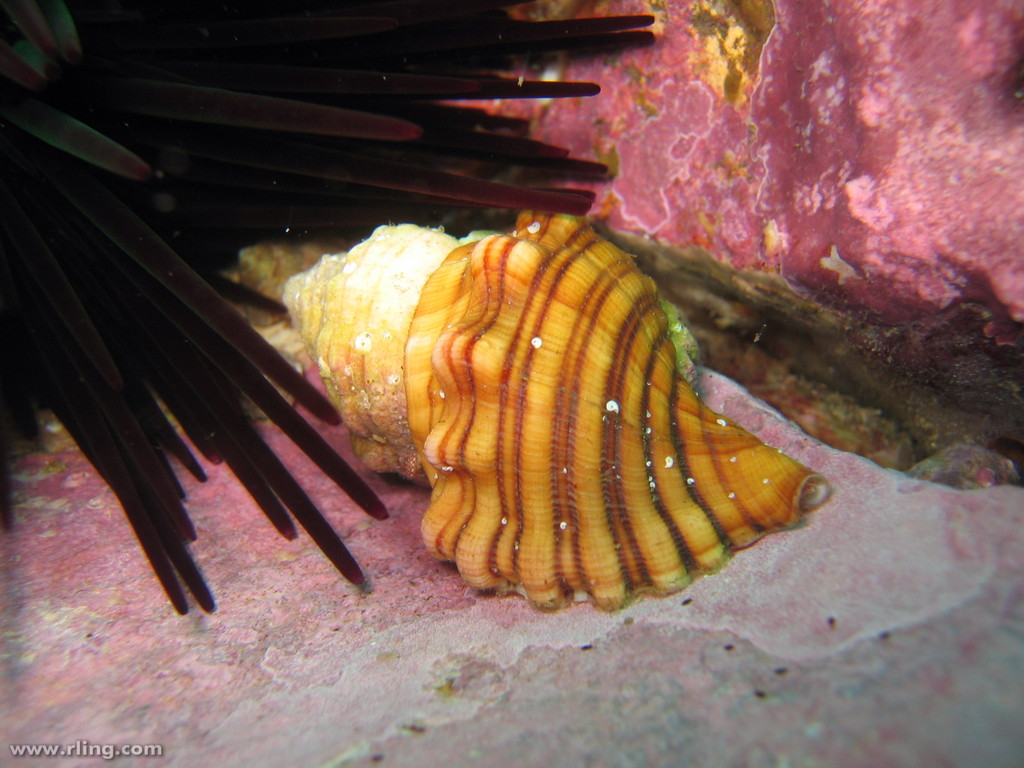
- A live but retracted individual of Cabestana spengleri in situ

Scientific classification
- Kingdom: Animalia
- Phylum: Mollusca
- Class: Gastropoda
- Subclass: Caenogastropoda
- Order: Littorinimorpha
- Family: Cymatiidae
- Genus: Cabestana; Röding, 1798

Type species
- Cabestana cutacea Linnaeus, 1767

Species
- See text

Synonyms
- Aquillus Montfort, 1810; Cabestana (Cymatilesta) Iredale, 1936; Cymatilesta Iredale, 1936; Cymatium (Cabestana) Röding, 1798; Dolarium Schlüter, 1838; Neptunella Gray, 1854; Triton (Cabestana); Tritonium (Cabestana) Röding, 1798

= Cabestana =

Genus of gastropods

Cabestana is a genus of medium to large sea snails known as predatory whelks, marine gastropod mollusks in the family Cymatiidae.

== Description ==
The ventricose shell is umbilicated. The whorls are nodosely ribbed. The outer lip is dentated internally.

== Distribution ==
This genus has a cosmopolitan distribution and is found in warm temperate and tropical waters.

== Species ==
The genus contains the following species:

- Cabestana africana (A. Adams, 1855)
- † Cabestana casus Kensley & Pether, 1986
- Cabestana cutacea Linnaeus, 1767
- Cabestana felipponei (von Ihering, 1907)
- Cabestana spengleri (Perry, 1811)
- Cabestana tabulata (Menke, 1843)
- † Cabestana tetleyi (Powell & Bartrum, 1929)

Species brought into synonymy

- Cabestana costata Röding, 1798: synonym of Cabestana cutacea (Linnaeus, 1767)
- † Cabestana debelior Finlay, 1930 : synonym of Cabestana tabulata (Menke, 1843)
- Cabestana dolaria (Linnaeus, 1767): synonym of Cabestana cutacea (Linnaeus, 1767)
- Cabestana doliata Röding, 1798: synonym of Cabestana cutacea (Linnaeus, 1767)
- Cabestana otagoensis Powell, 1954 : synonym of Cabestana tabulata (Menke, 1843)
- † Cabestana manawatuna C. A. Fleming, 1943: synonym of † Cabestana tabulata (Menke, 1843)
- Cabestana waterhousei (A. Adams & Angas, 1864) : synonym of Cabestana tabulata (Menke, 1843)
- Cabestana (Turritriton) labiosa (Wood, 1828): synonym of Turritriton labiosus (Wood, 1828)
