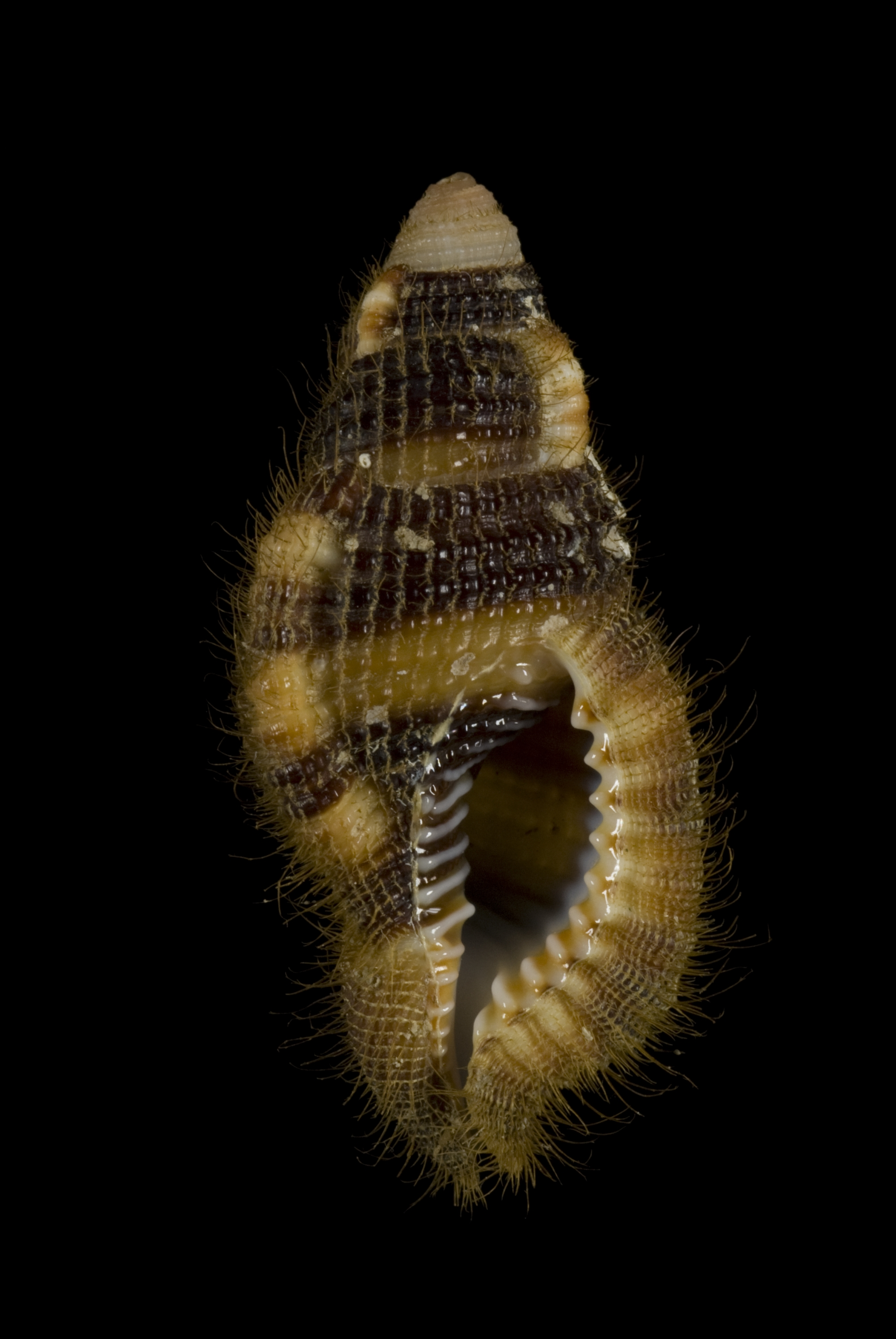
- Shell of Septa flaveola (specimen at MNHN, Paris)

Scientific classification
- Kingdom: Animalia
- Phylum: Mollusca
- Class: Gastropoda
- Subclass: Caenogastropoda
- Order: Littorinimorpha
- Family: Cymatiidae
- Genus: Septa
- Species: S. flaveola

Binomial name
- Septa flaveola (Röding, 1798)

Synonyms
- Tritonium flaveola Röding, 1798; Tritonium limbatum Röding, 1798

= Septa flaveola =

Species of gastropod

Septa flaveola is a species of predatory sea snail, a marine gastropod mollusk in the family Cymatiidae.

== Distribution ==
This marine species occurs off Papua New Guinea.
