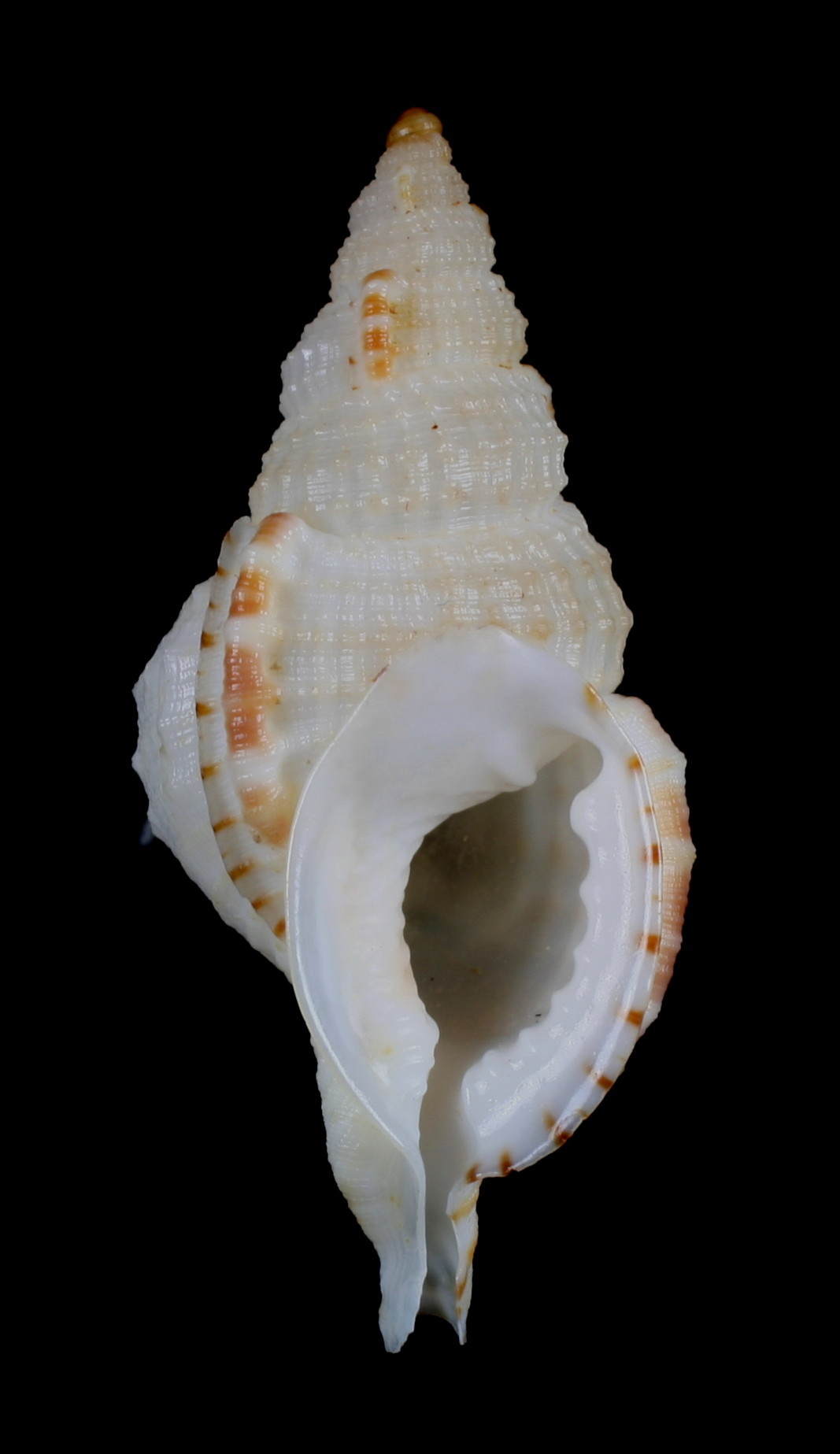
- Apertural view of Sassia semitorta (Kuroda & Habe in Habe, 1961)

Scientific classification
- Kingdom: Animalia
- Phylum: Mollusca
- Class: Gastropoda
- Subclass: Caenogastropoda
- Order: Littorinimorpha
- Superfamily: Tonnoidea
- Family: Cymatiidae
- Genus: Sassia
- Species: S. semitorta

Binomial name
- Sassia semitorta (Kuroda & Habe in Habe, 1961)

Synonyms
- Phanozesta sakuraii Kuroda & Habe in Habe, 1961; Phanozesta semitorta Kuroda & Habe in Habe, 1961

= Sassia semitorta =

Species of gastropod

Sassia semitorta is a species of predatory sea snail, a marine gastropod mollusk in the family Cymatiidae.

== Distribution ==
This species occurs in China Seas.
