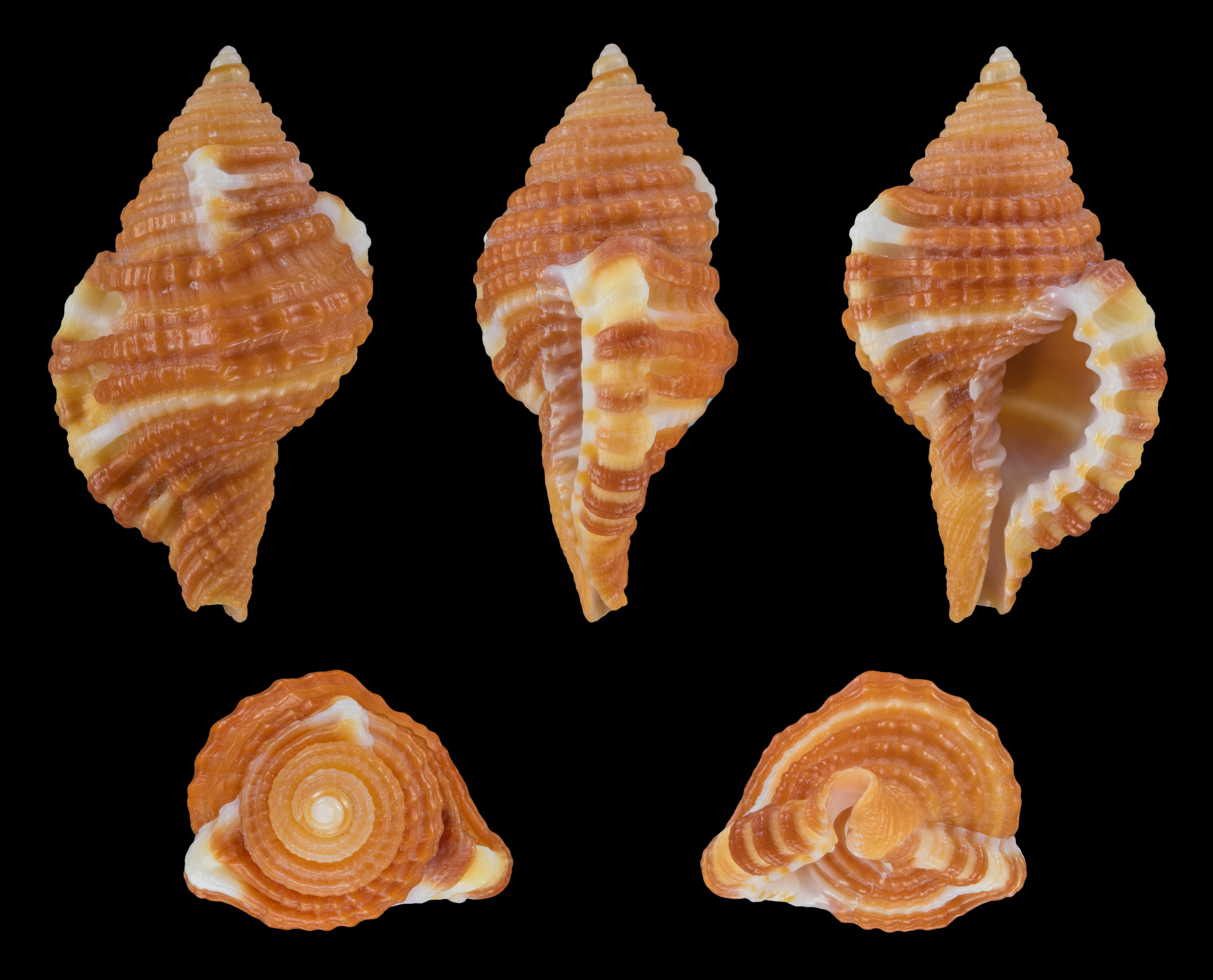

Scientific classification
- Kingdom: Animalia
- Phylum: Mollusca
- Class: Gastropoda
- Subclass: Caenogastropoda
- Order: Littorinimorpha
- Family: Cymatiidae
- Genus: Septa
- Species: S. marerubrum

Binomial name
- Septa marerubrum (Garcia-Talavera, 1985)

Synonyms
- Cymatium (Septa) marerubrum Garcia-Talavera, 1985; Cymatium marerubrum

= Septa marerubrum =

Species of gastropod

Septa marerubrum is a species of predatory sea snail, a marine gastropod mollusk in the family Cymatiidae.

== Description ==
The typical shell length is approximately 35 mm, but can reach 50 mm.

== Distribution ==
This species is found in the Red Sea. It inhabits shallow waters at depths ranging from low tide to 20 m.
