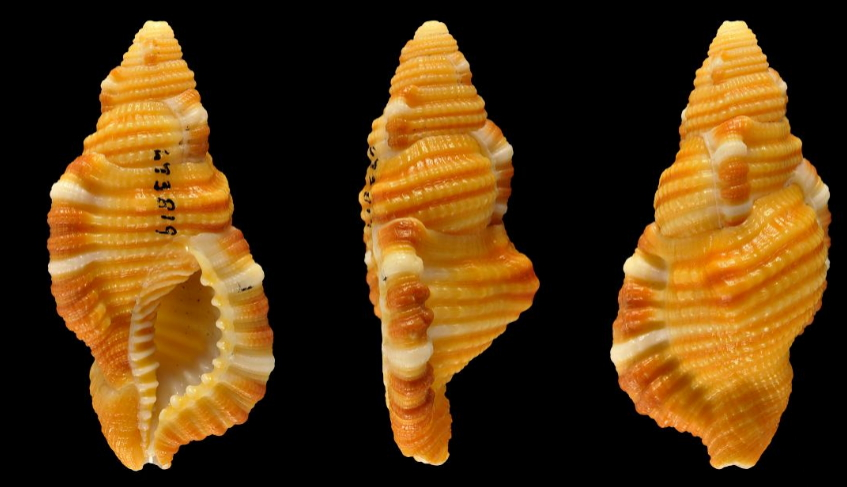
- Shell of Septa closeli (holotype at the Smithsonian Institution)

Scientific classification
- Kingdom: Animalia
- Phylum: Mollusca
- Class: Gastropoda
- Subclass: Caenogastropoda
- Order: Littorinimorpha
- Family: Cymatiidae
- Genus: Septa
- Species: S. closeli

Binomial name
- Septa closeli (Beu, 1987)

Synonyms
- Cymatium (Septa) closeli Beu, 1987; Cymatium closeli Beu, 1987

= Septa closeli =

Species of gastropod

Septa closeli is a species of predatory sea snail, a marine gastropod mollusk in the family Cymatiidae.

== Description ==
The length of this species attains 59 mm.

== Distribution ==
This species occurs in the Indian Ocean off Mozambique and Madagascar.
