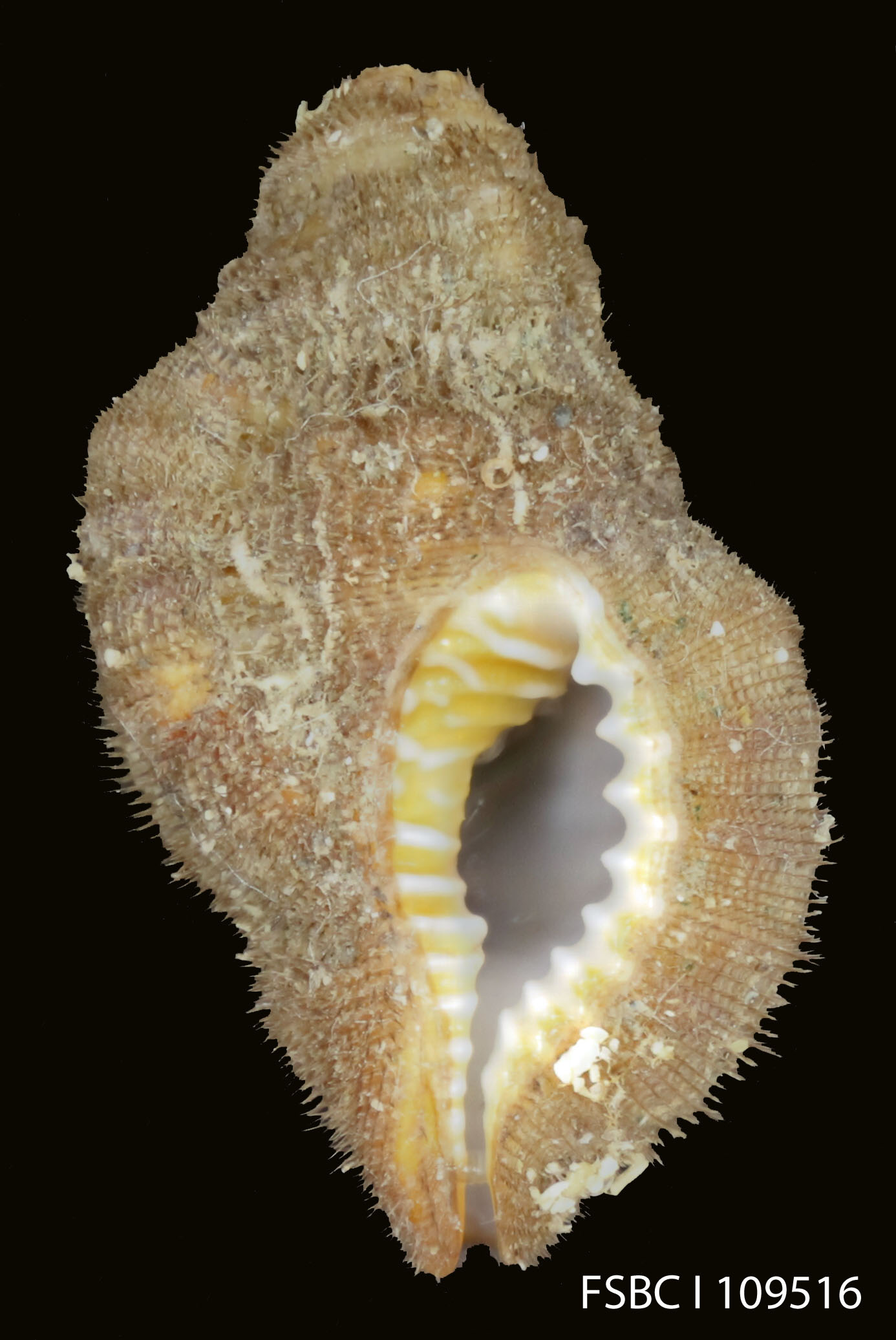

Scientific classification
- Kingdom: Animalia
- Phylum: Mollusca
- Class: Gastropoda
- Subclass: Caenogastropoda
- Order: Littorinimorpha
- Family: Cymatiidae
- Genus: Septa
- Species: S. occidentalis

Binomial name
- Septa occidentalis (Mörch, 1877)

Synonyms
- Cymatium (Septa) beui Garcia-Talavera, 1985; Cymatium occidentale (Mörch, 1877); Septa blacketi Iredale, 1936; Triton (Lampusia) rubecula occidentale Mörch, 1877

= Septa occidentalis =

Species of gastropod

Septa occidentalis is a species of predatory sea snail, a marine gastropod mollusk in the family Cymatiidae.
