= Sassia midwayensis =

Scientific classification
- Kingdom: Animalia
- Phylum: Mollusca
- Class: Gastropoda
- Subclass: Caenogastropoda
- Order: Littorinimorpha
- Family: Cymatiidae
- Genus: Sassia
- Species: S. midwayensis

Binomial name
- Sassia midwayensis (Habe & Okutani, 1968)

Synonyms
- Fusitriton midwayensis Habe & Okutani, 1968

Species of gastropod

Sassia midwayensis is a species of predatory sea snail, a marine gastropod mollusk in the family Cymatiidae.
