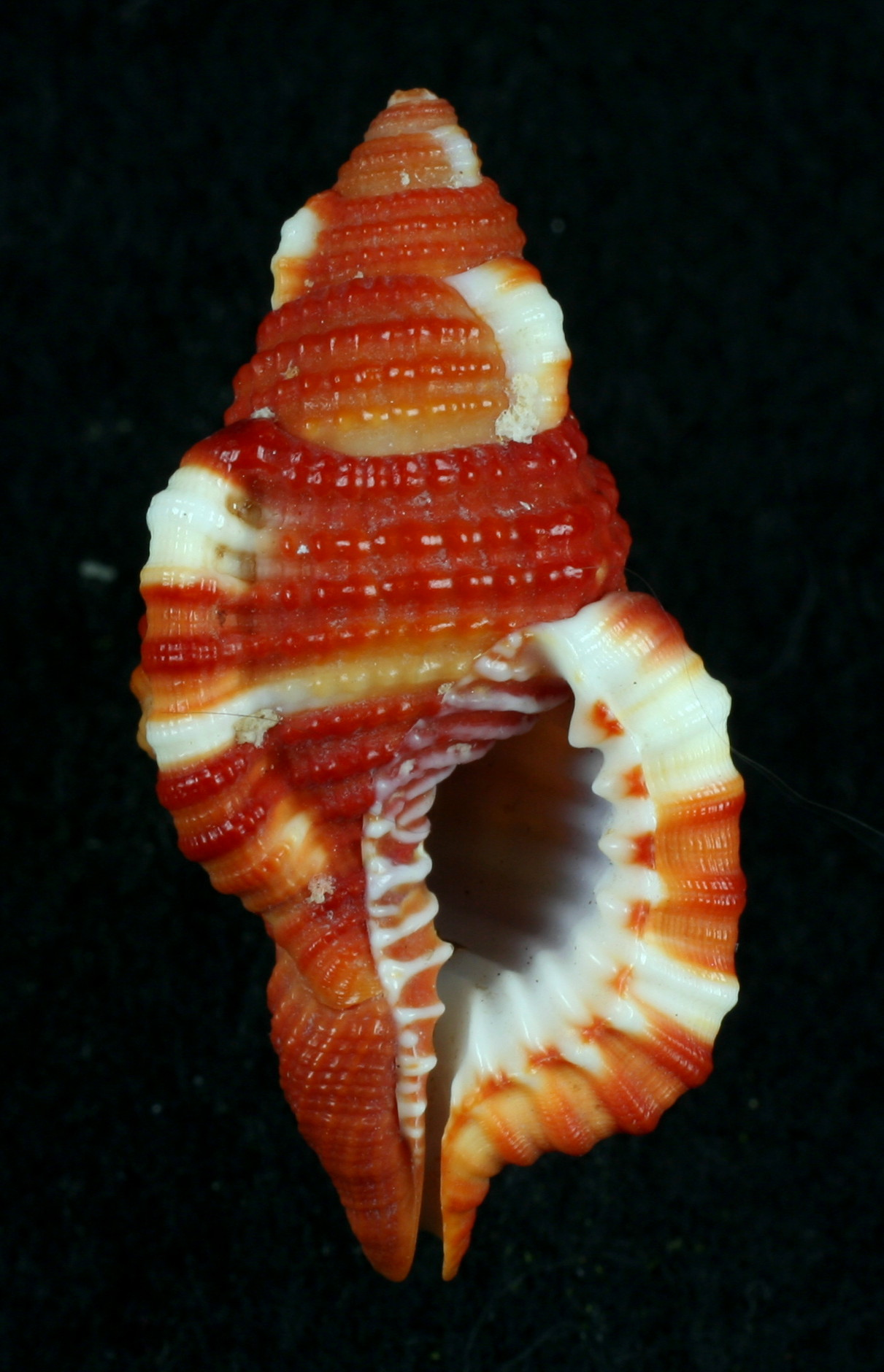
- Apertural view of Septa rubecula (Linnaeus, 1758)

Scientific classification
- Kingdom: Animalia
- Phylum: Mollusca
- Class: Gastropoda
- Subclass: Caenogastropoda
- Order: Littorinimorpha
- Family: Cymatiidae
- Genus: Septa
- Species: S. rubecula

Binomial name
- Septa rubecula (Linnaeus, 1758)

Synonyms
- Murex rubecula Linnaeus, 1758; Cymatium rubeculum (Linnaeus, 1758); Cymatium scarlatina Perry, G., 1811; Lampusia rubecula (Linnaeus, 1758); Septa scarlatina Perry, 1810; Triton (Lampusia) rubecula (Linnaeus, 1758); Triton rubeculatum Liénard, E., 1877

= Septa rubecula =

Species of gastropod

Septa rubecula, the ruby triton or the red redbreast triton, is a species of predatory sea snail, a marine gastropod mollusk in the family Cymatiidae.

== Subspecies ==
- Septa rubecula rebeculum
- Septa rubecula occidentale

== Distribution ==
This species is distributed in the Indian Ocean off Chagos, the Mascarene basin and Tanzania and in the Indo-West Pacific.; also off New Caledonia.

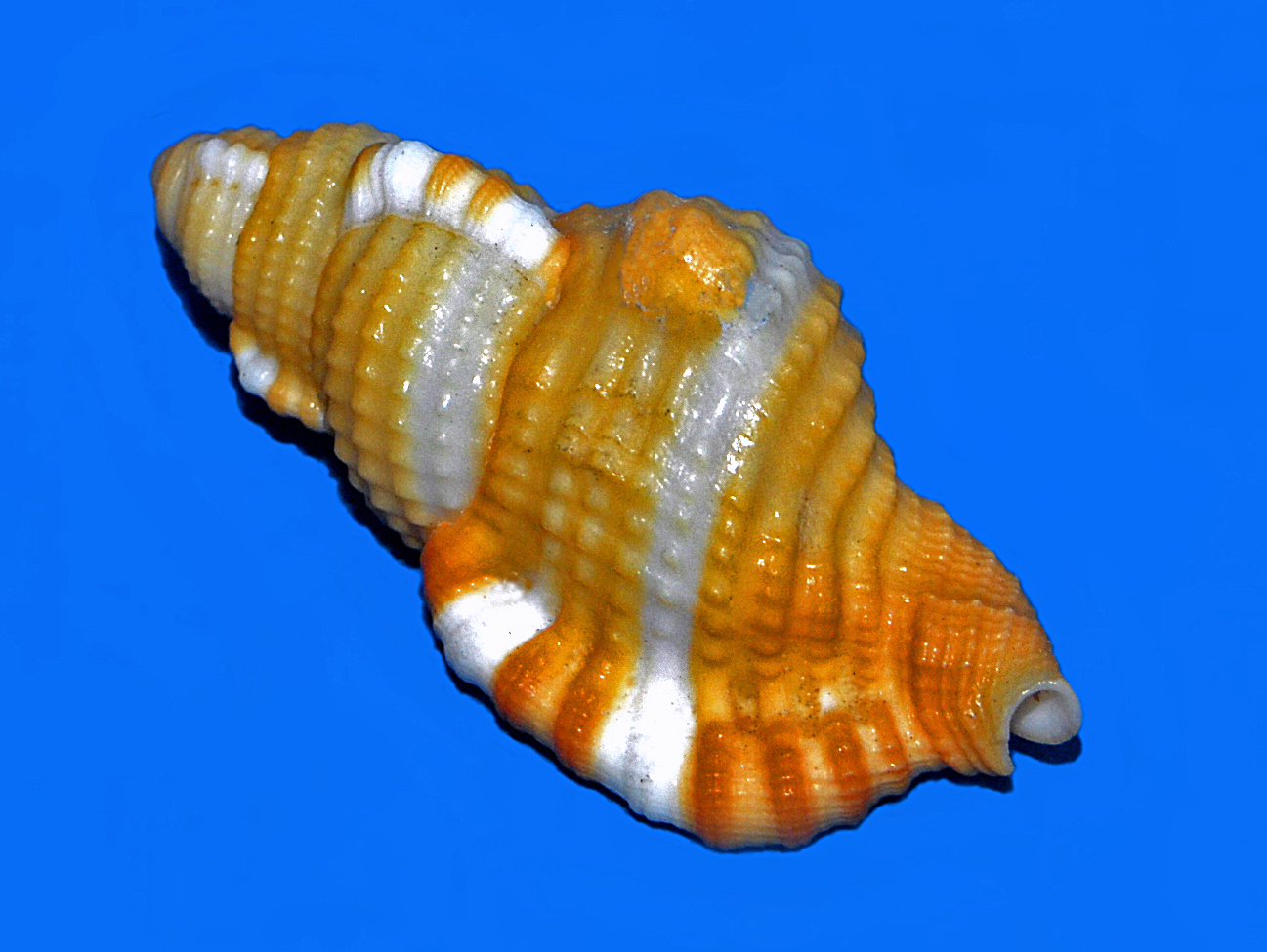
A shell of Septa rubecula from Red Sea, on display at the Museo Civico di Storia Naturale di Milano

== Description ==
The shell size of Septa rubecula varies between 25 mm and 55 mm. These moderately small shells are commonly rather solid, ovate and vetricose. The six convex whorls are sculptured with one varix on each whorl and with spiral cords, nodules and knobs. Siphonal canal is moderately long. The external shell surface is quite variable in color. It may be bright or dark red, orange or brown with a small white or yellowish transversal band on whorls and with small white patches on varices. The outer lip is ornamented with 8–10 white prominent denticles. The columella is reddish. The inner surface of the aperture is white. The periostracum is yellowish-brown.

== Habitat ==
Under coral rocks, on sand and coral substrate at depths of 0.5 to 145 m.

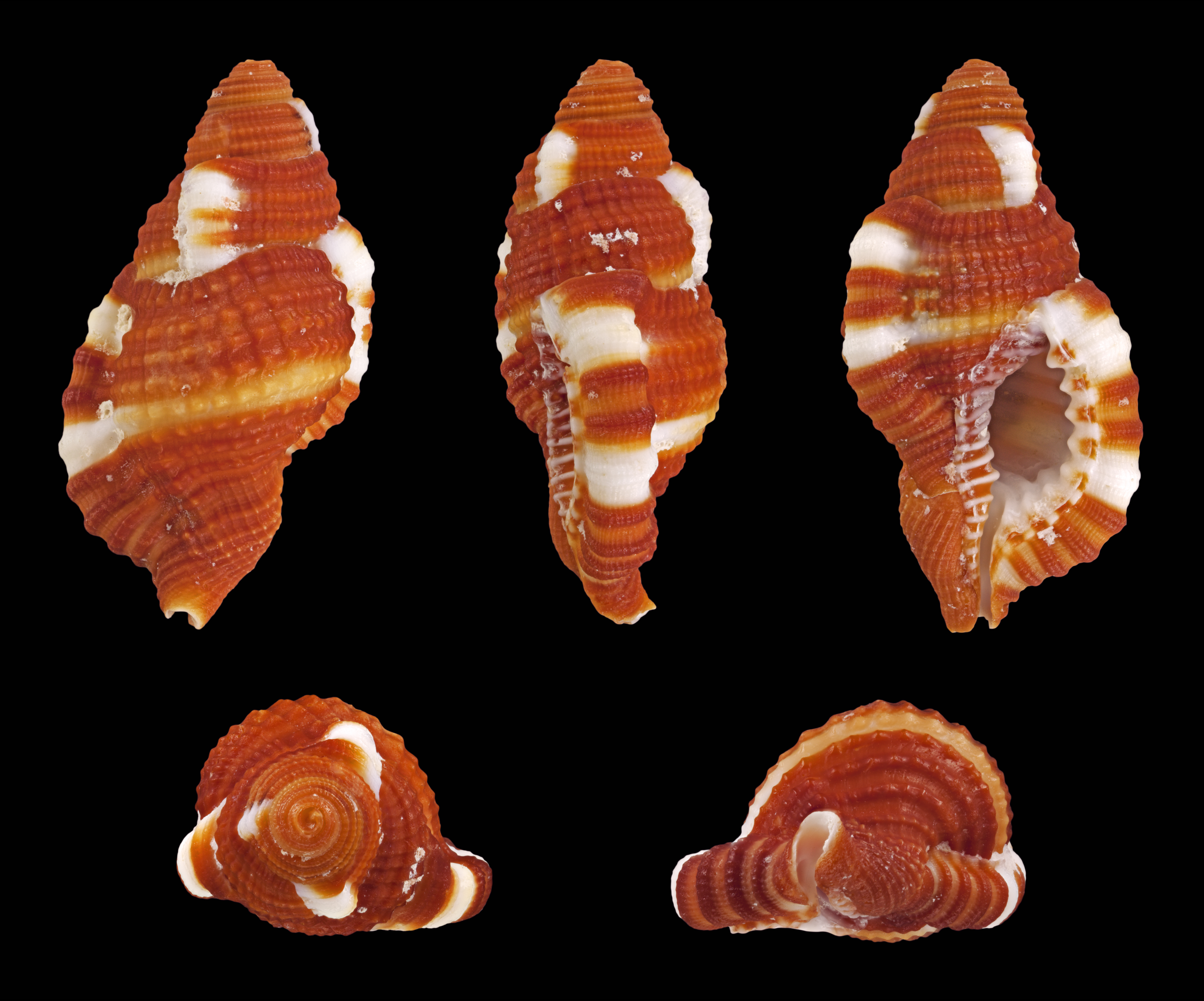
Five views of a shell of Septa rubecula

== Bibliography ==
- A.G. Hinton - Guide to Australian Shells
- A.G. Hinton - Guide to Shells of Papua New Guinea
- A.G. Hinton - Shells of New Guinea & Central Pacific
- B. Dharma - Indonesian Shells I
- C. Michel - Marine Molluscs of Mauritius
- Drivas, J. & M. Jay (1988). Coquillages de La Réunion et de l'île Maurice
- F Springsteen, F. M. Leobrera - Shells of the Philippines
- G. T. Poppe - Philippine Marine Molluscs Vol. 1
- Hirofumi Kubo and Taiji Kurozumi - Molluscs of Okinawa
- R. Tucker Abbott - Seashells of South East Asia
- Thomas Henning, Jens Hemmen - Ranellidae & Personidae of the World
- ITIS: The Integrated Taxonomic Information System. Orrell T. (custodian)
- Beu, A. (2010). Catalogue of Tonnoidea. Pers. comm
