= Cymatona =

Scientific classification
- Kingdom: Animalia
- Phylum: Mollusca
- Class: Gastropoda
- Subclass: Caenogastropoda
- Order: Littorinimorpha
- Family: Cymatiidae
- Genus: Cymatona; Iredale, 1929

Genus of gastropods

Cymatona is a genus of sea snails, marine gastropod molluscs in the family Cymatiidae.

== Species ==
Species within the genus Cymatona include:

- Cymatona kampyla
- Cymatona philomelae
