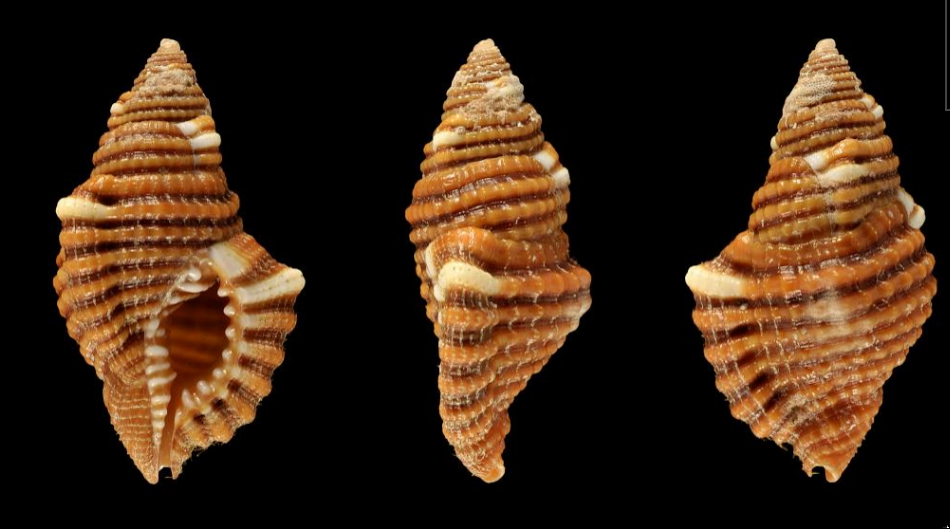
- Shell of Septa peasei (holotype)

Scientific classification
- Kingdom: Animalia
- Phylum: Mollusca
- Class: Gastropoda
- Subclass: Caenogastropoda
- Order: Littorinimorpha
- Family: Cymatiidae
- Genus: Septa
- Species: S. peasei

Binomial name
- Septa peasei (Beu, 1987)

Synonyms
- Cymatium (Septa) peasei Beu, 1987

= Septa peasei =

Species of gastropod

Septa peasei is a species of predatory sea snail, a marine gastropod mollusk in the family Cymatiidae.

== Description ==
The length of the shell attains 34 mm.

== Distribution ==
This marine species occurs in the Indo-West Pacific (Mozambique, Tanzania, Zanzibar, Marquesas Islands, Cocos Keeling Islands, Fiji) and in the Bay of Bengal (India, Myanmar). they generally lie at around 0-5 meters.
