= Septa mixta =

Scientific classification
- Kingdom: Animalia
- Phylum: Mollusca
- Class: Gastropoda
- Subclass: Caenogastropoda
- Order: Littorinimorpha
- Family: Cymatiidae
- Genus: Septa
- Species: S. mixta

Binomial name
- Septa mixta (Arthur & Garcia-Talavera, 1990)

Synonyms
- Cymatium (Septa) mixta Arthur & Garcia-Talavera, 1990

Species of gastropod

Septa mixta is a species of predatory sea snail, a marine gastropod mollusk in the family Cymatiidae.
