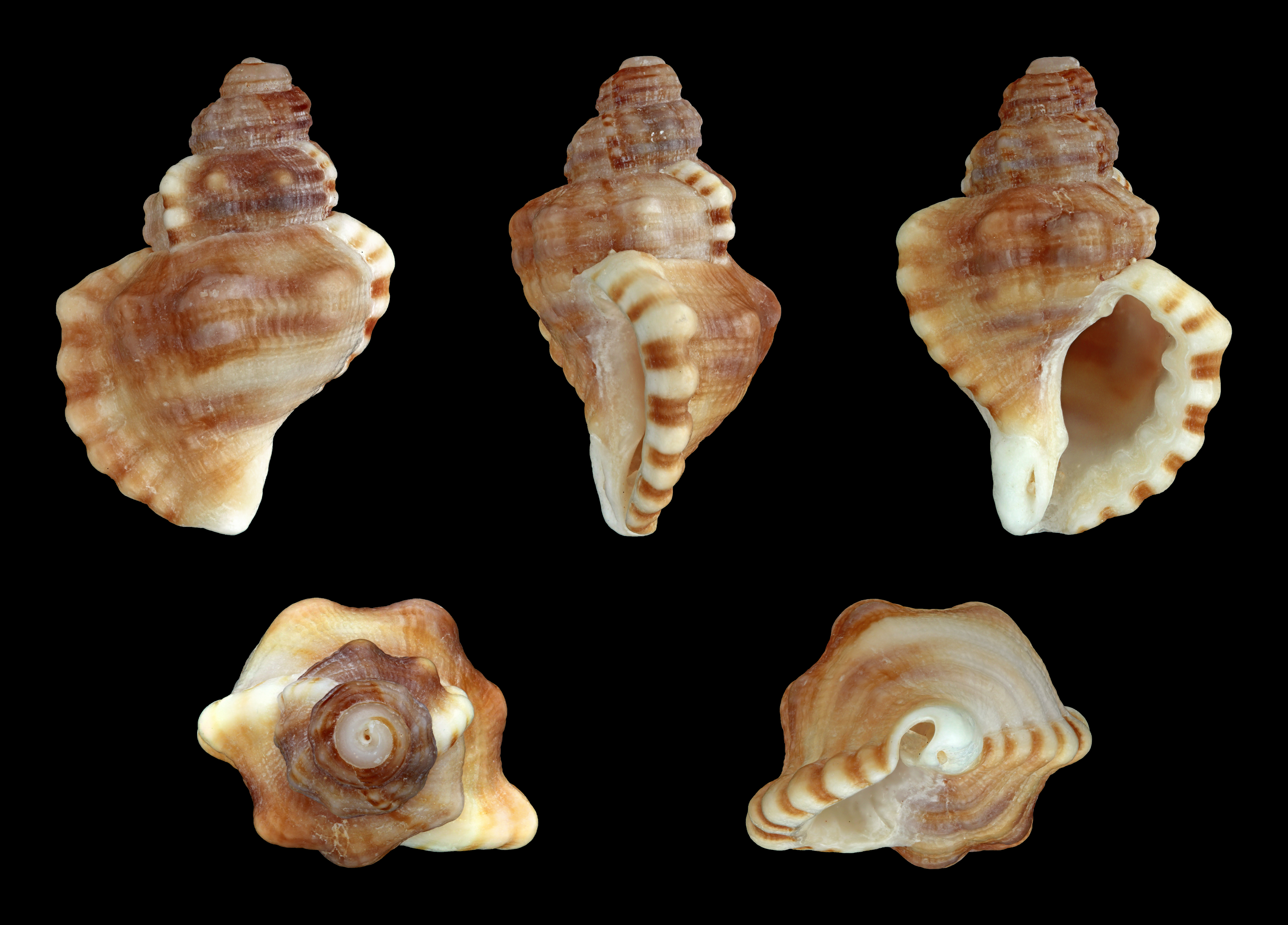
- Cabestana cutacea cutacea
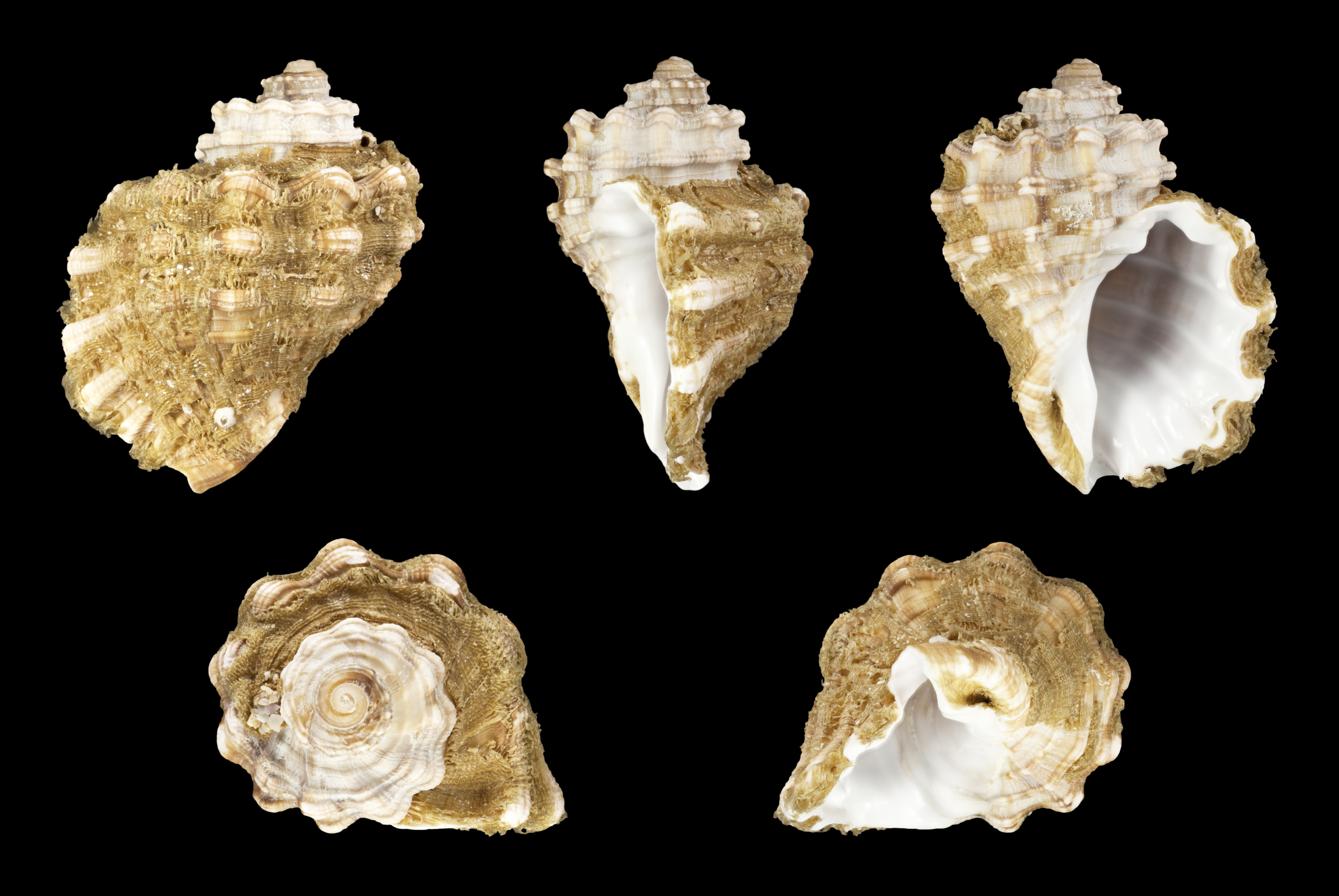
- Cabestana cutacea dolaria

Scientific classification
- Kingdom: Animalia
- Phylum: Mollusca
- Class: Gastropoda
- Subclass: Caenogastropoda
- Order: Littorinimorpha
- Family: Cymatiidae
- Genus: Cabestana
- Species: C. cutacea

Binomial name
- Cabestana cutacea (Linnaeus, 1767)

Synonyms
- See text.

= Cabestana cutacea =

Species of gastropod

Cabestana cutacea, the Mediterranean bark triton, is a species of predatory sea snail, a marine gastropod mollusk in the family Cymatiidae.

== Description ==
The adult shell size varies between 25 mm and 90 mm.

The revolving ribs are elegantly sculptured into close, beadlike nodules. The shell is light yellowish brown, white within the aperture.

The epidermis differs from that of most of the Tritons in being a thin, smooth skin.

Philippi describes the animal thus: Body on the upper part painted with irregular spots of dark purple, which are separated by narrow white lines; foot pale violet above, marbled on the sides, and speckled here and there with reddish spots which are edged with white.

== Distribution ==
This species is found in European waters (Spain); in the Atlantic Ocean off the Canary Islands, the Azores and the Cape Verdes; and off Mozambique and South Africa.

== List of synonyms ==
- Aquillus cutaceus (Linnaeus, 1767)
- Aquillus cutaceus var. major Pallary, 1920
- Aquillus dolarium (Linnaeus, 1767)
- Aquillus dolarium attenuata (f) Pallary, P., 1920
- Aquillus dolarium elongata (f) Pallary, P., 1920
- Aquillus dolarium major (f) Pallary, P., 1920
- Cabestana costata Röding, 1798
- Cabestana cutacea cutacea (Linnaeus, 1767)
- Cabestana dolaria (Linnaeus, 1767)
- Cabestana doliata Röding, 1798
- Cymatium doliarium Linnaeus 1767
- Murex cutaceus Linnaeus, 1767
- Murex dolarium Linnaeus, 1767
- Murex succinctus Risso, 1826
- Ranella lemania Risso, 1826
- Ranella tuberculata Risso, 1826
- Simpulum dolarium (Linnaeus, 1767)
- Simpulum dolarium var. elongata Pallary, 1903
- Triton africanum Adams A., 1855
- Triton cutaceum (Linnaeus, 1767) (incorrect gender agreement of specific epithet)
- Triton cutaceus (Linnaeus, 1767)
- Triton cutaceus var. curta Buquoy, Dautzenberg & Dollfus, 1882
- Triton cutaceus var. gerna de Gregorio, 1885
- Triton cutaceus var. isgura de Gregorio, 1885
- Tritonium curtum Locard, 1886
- Tritonium danieli Locard, 1886
