= Sassia melpangi =

Scientific classification
- Kingdom: Animalia
- Phylum: Mollusca
- Class: Gastropoda
- Subclass: Caenogastropoda
- Order: Littorinimorpha
- Family: Cymatiidae
- Genus: Sassia
- Species: S. melpangi

Binomial name
- Sassia melpangi Harasewych & Beu, 2007

Species of gastropod

Sassia melpangi is a species of predatory sea snail, a marine gastropod mollusk in the family Cymatiidae.
