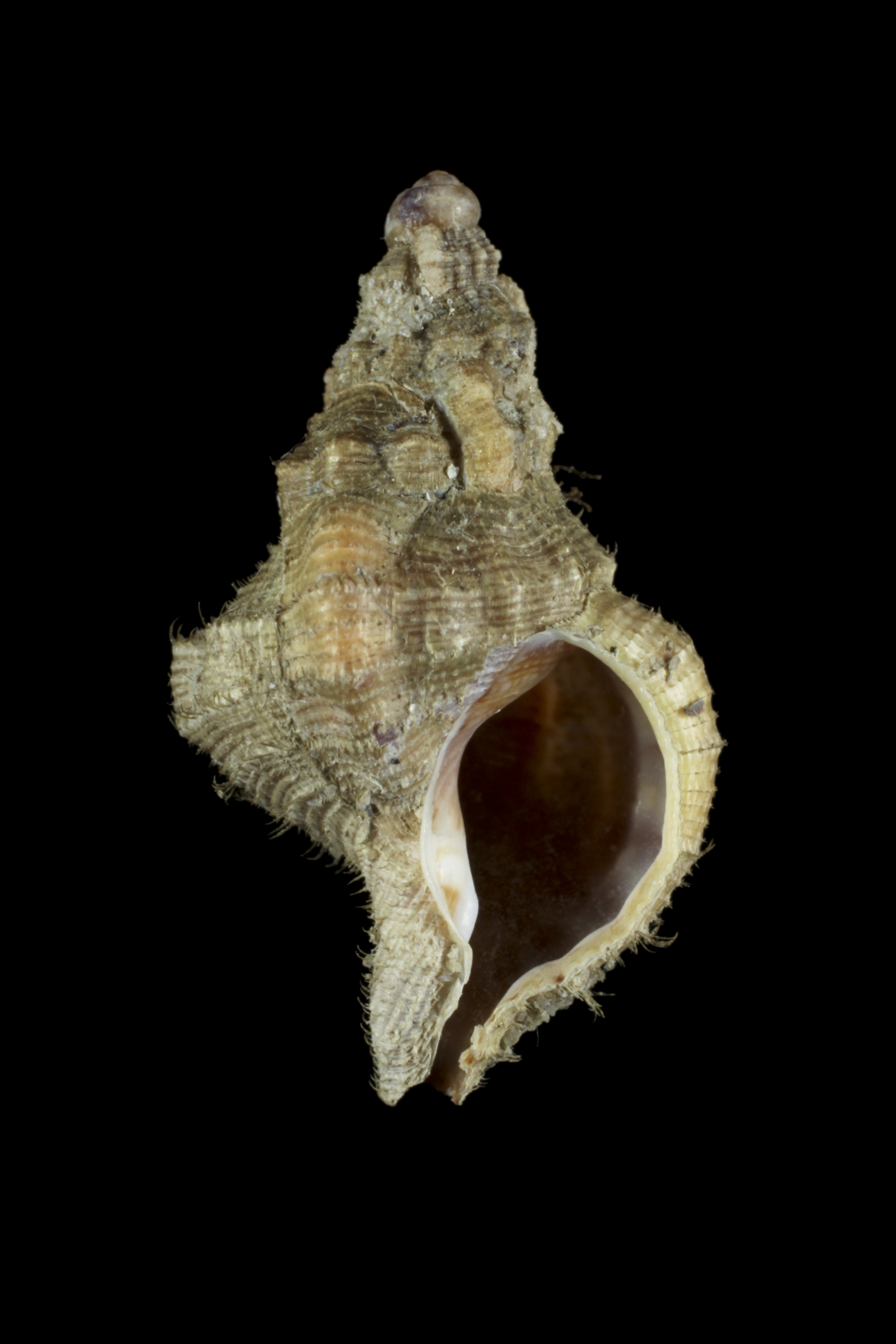
- Shell of Austrosassia parkinsonia

Scientific classification
- Kingdom: Animalia
- Phylum: Mollusca
- Class: Gastropoda
- Subclass: Caenogastropoda
- Order: Littorinimorpha
- Family: Cymatiidae
- Genus: Austrosassia; Finlay, 1931

Type species
- Septa parkinsonia Perry, 1811

= Austrosassia =

Genus of gastropods

Austrosassia is a genus of sea snails, a marine gastropod mollusc in the family Cymatiidae.

== Species ==
The genus contains the following species:

- Austrosassia parkinsonia (Perry, 1811)
- Austrosassia ponderi (Beu, 1987)

Species brought into synonymy

- Austrosassia pahaoaensis Vella, 1954 †: synonym of Sassia pahaoaensis (Vella, 1954) †
- Austrosassia parkinsoniana [sic]: synonym of Austrosassia parkinsonia (Perry, 1811) (misspelling)
- Austrosassia procera Finlay, 1931 †: synonym of Sassia minima (Hutton, 1873) † (original combination)
- Austrosassia pusulosa Marwick, 1965 †: synonym of Sassia pusulosa (Marwick, 1965) † (original combination)
- Austrosassia zealta Laws, 1939 †: synonym of Sassia zealta (Laws, 1939) † (original combination)
