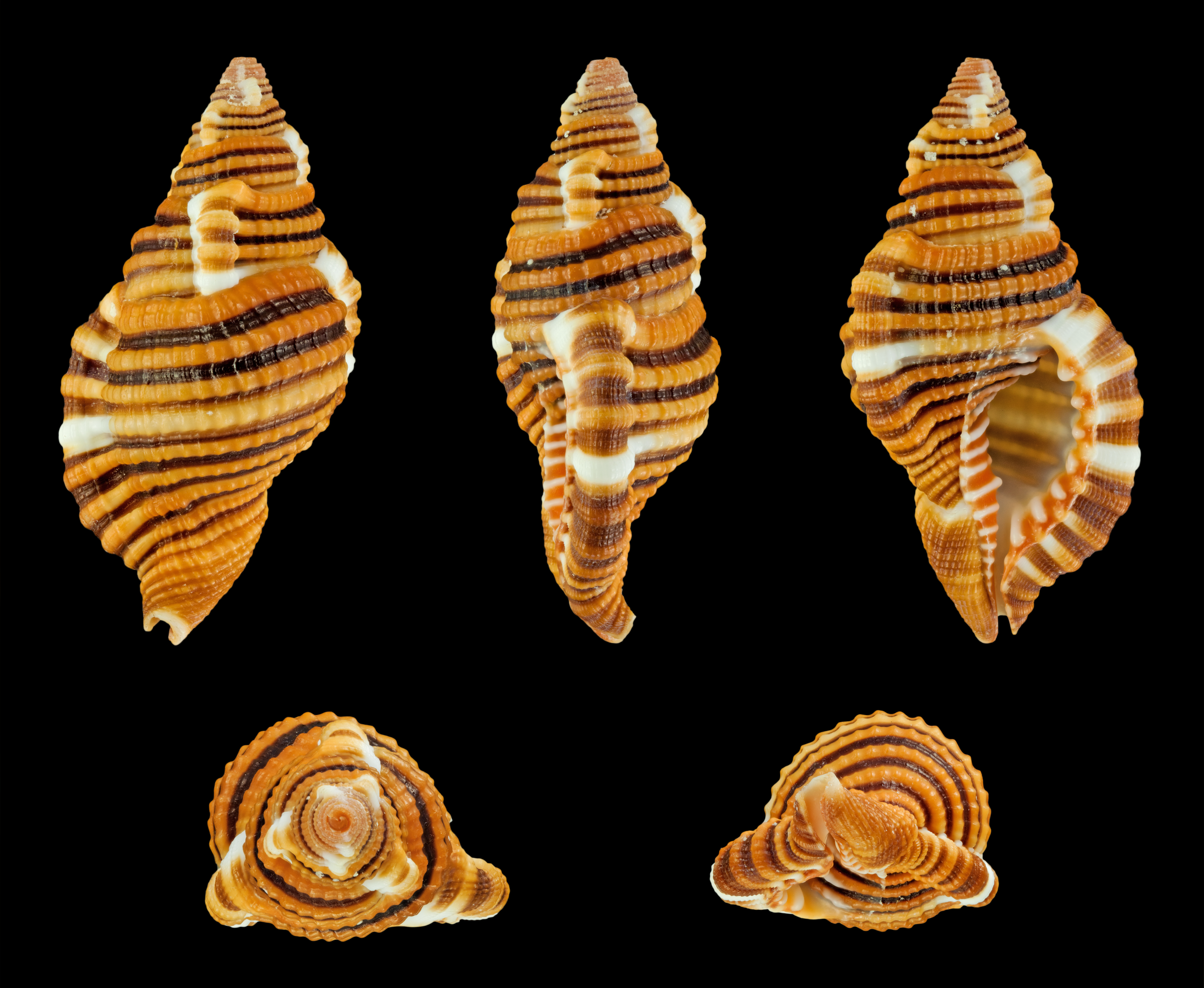
- Septa hepatica (Röding, 1798)

Scientific classification
- Kingdom: Animalia
- Phylum: Mollusca
- Class: Gastropoda
- Subclass: Caenogastropoda
- Order: Littorinimorpha
- Family: Cymatiidae
- Genus: Septa
- Species: S. hepatica

Binomial name
- Septa hepatica (Röding, 1798)

Synonyms
- Cymatium hepaticum (Röding, 1798); Tritonium hepatica Röding, 1798

= Septa hepatica =

Species of gastropod

Septa hepatica is a species of predatory sea snail, a marine gastropod mollusk in the family Cymatiidae.

== Distribution ==
This marine species occurs in the Indian Ocean off the Mascarene Basin; also off Papua New Guinea.
