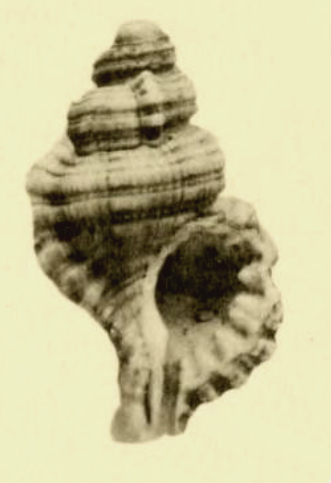
- Shell of Cabestana felipponei (holotype)

Scientific classification
- Kingdom: Animalia
- Phylum: Mollusca
- Class: Gastropoda
- Subclass: Caenogastropoda
- Order: Littorinimorpha
- Superfamily: Tonnoidea
- Family: Cymatiidae
- Genus: Cabestana
- Species: C. felipponei

Binomial name
- Cabestana felipponei (H. von Ihering, 1907)

Synonyms
- Triton felipponei von Ihering, 1907; † Tritonium filipponei Ihering, 1907 ·

= Cabestana felipponei =

Species of gastropod

Cabestana felipponei is a species of predatory sea snail, a marine gastropod mollusk in the family Cymatiidae.

== Distribution ==
Lobster traps set at 70-80 m. off Rio, Brazil and Uruguay. Atlantic Ocean.

== Description ==
The maximum recorded shell length is 53 mm.

== Habitat ==
Minimum recorded depth is 30 m. Maximum recorded depth is 140 m.
