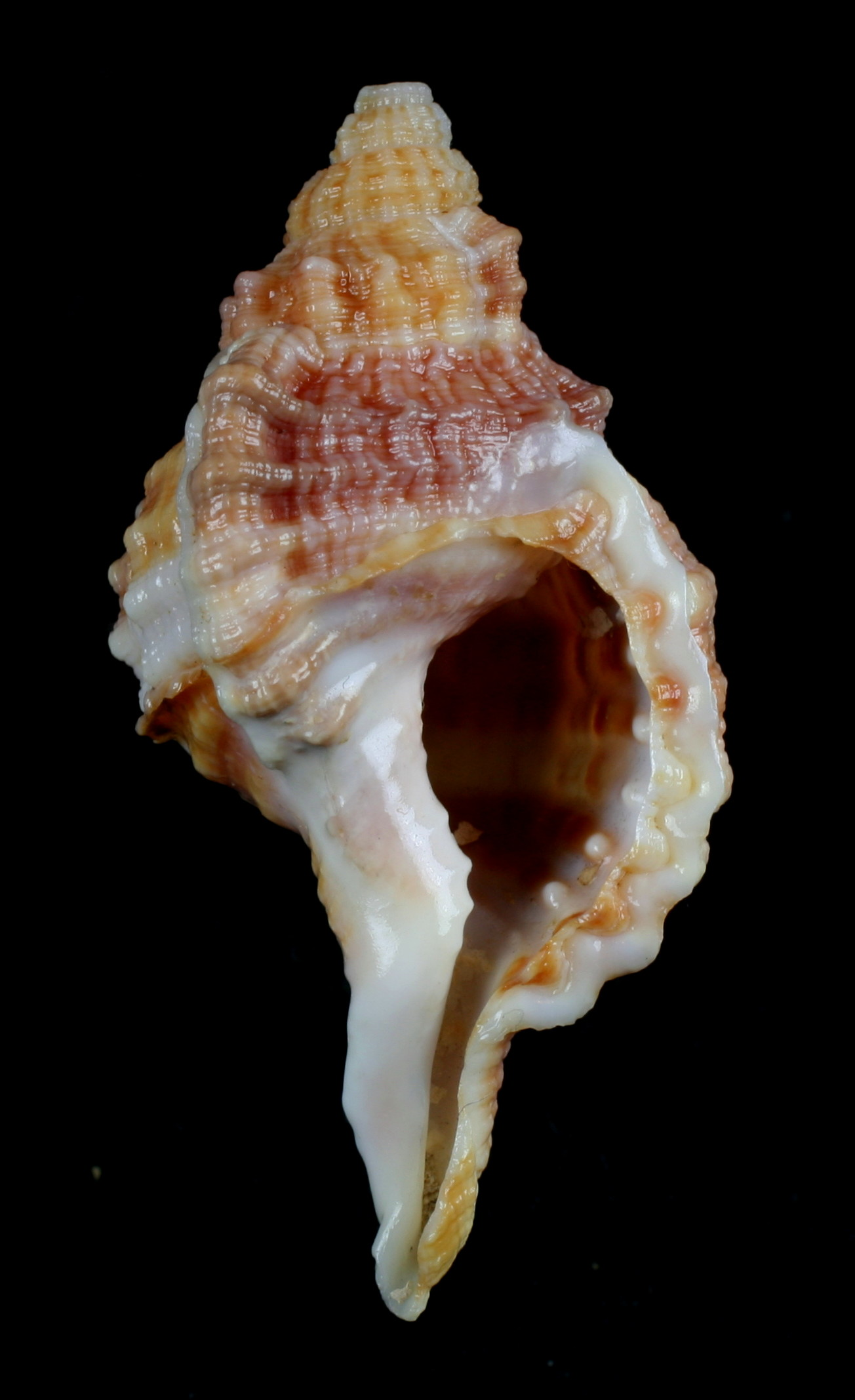
- Apertural view of a shell of Cabestana africana (A. Adams, 1855)

Scientific classification
- Kingdom: Animalia
- Phylum: Mollusca
- Class: Gastropoda
- Subclass: Caenogastropoda
- Order: Littorinimorpha
- Superfamily: Tonnoidea
- Family: Cymatiidae
- Genus: Cabestana
- Species: C. africana

Binomial name
- Cabestana africana (A. Adams, 1855)

Synonyms
- Cabestana africana var. forticostatum W. H. Turton, 1932; Cabestana cutacea africana Adams A. 1855; Cymatium africanum (A. Adams, 1855) · superseded combination; Cymatium cutaceum africanum (A. Adams, 1855); Cymatium dolarium var. adjacens W. H. Turton, 1932 (junior synonym); Cymatium dolarium var. forticostatum W. H. Turton, 1932 (junior synonym); Triton (Cabestana) africanus A. Adams, 1855 (basionym); Triton africanus A. Adams, 1855 (original combination)

= Cabestana africana =

Species of gastropod

Cabestana africana is a species of predatory sea snail, a marine gastropod mollusk in the family Cymatiidae.

== Description ==
The size of the shell varies between 60 mm and 115 mm.

The body whorl is nearly smooth. The upper whorls show spiral elevated ridges. The red-brown shell is white within the aperture.

== Distribution ==
This marine species occurs off South Africa.
