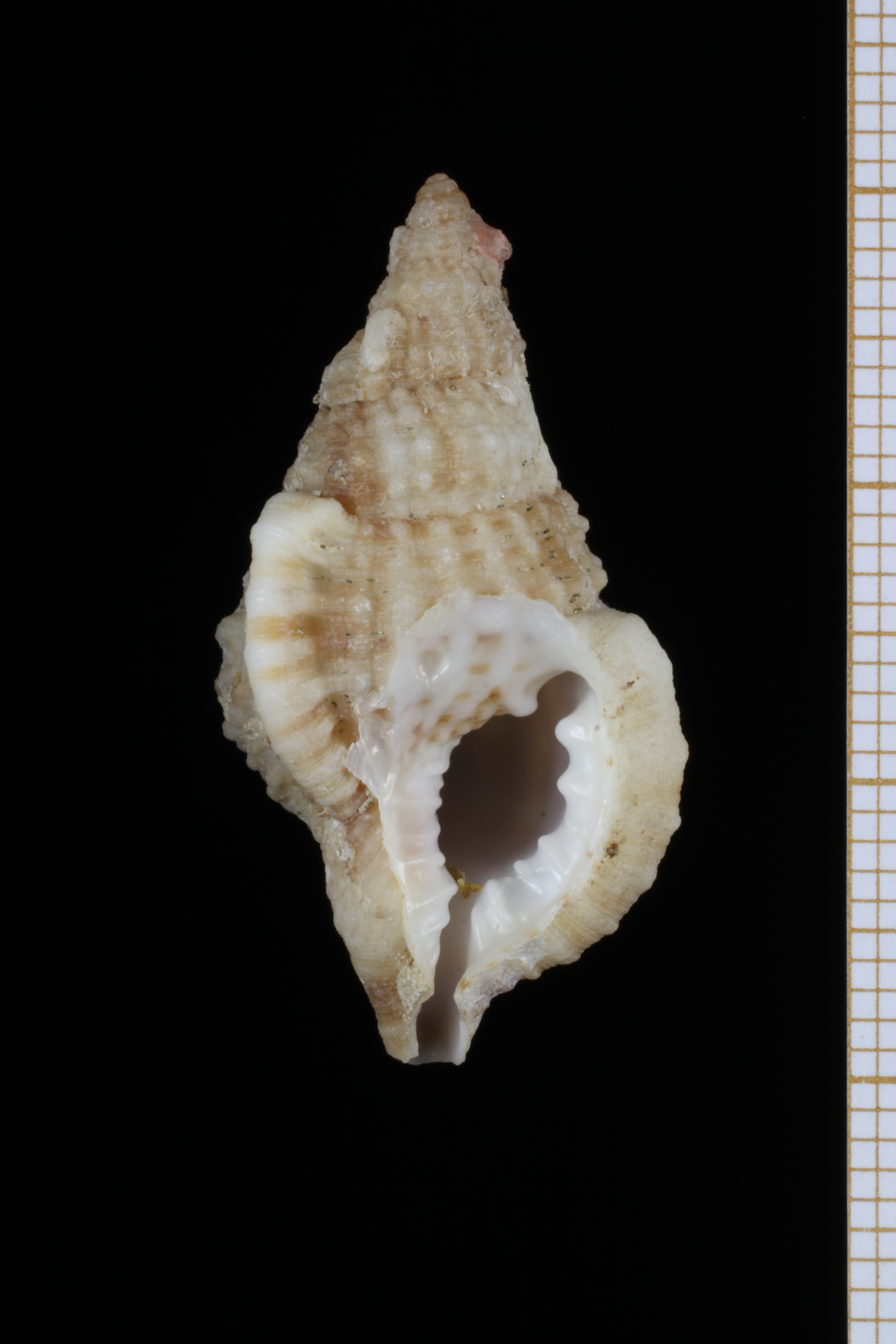
- Shell of Sassia nassariformis (specimen at MNHN, Paris)

Scientific classification
- Kingdom: Animalia
- Phylum: Mollusca
- Class: Gastropoda
- Subclass: Caenogastropoda
- Order: Littorinimorpha
- Family: Cymatiidae
- Genus: Sassia
- Species: S. nassariformis

Binomial name
- Sassia nassariformis (G.B. Sowerby III, 1902)

Synonyms
- Argobuccinum (Cymatiella) nassariforme (G. B. Sowerby III, 1902) (superseded combination); Lotorium nassariformis G.B. Sowerby III, 1902

= Sassia nassariformis =

Species of gastropod

Sassia nassariformis is a species of predatory sea snail, a marine gastropod mollusk in the family Cymatiidae.

== Distribution ==
This marine species occurs in the Mozambique Channel.
