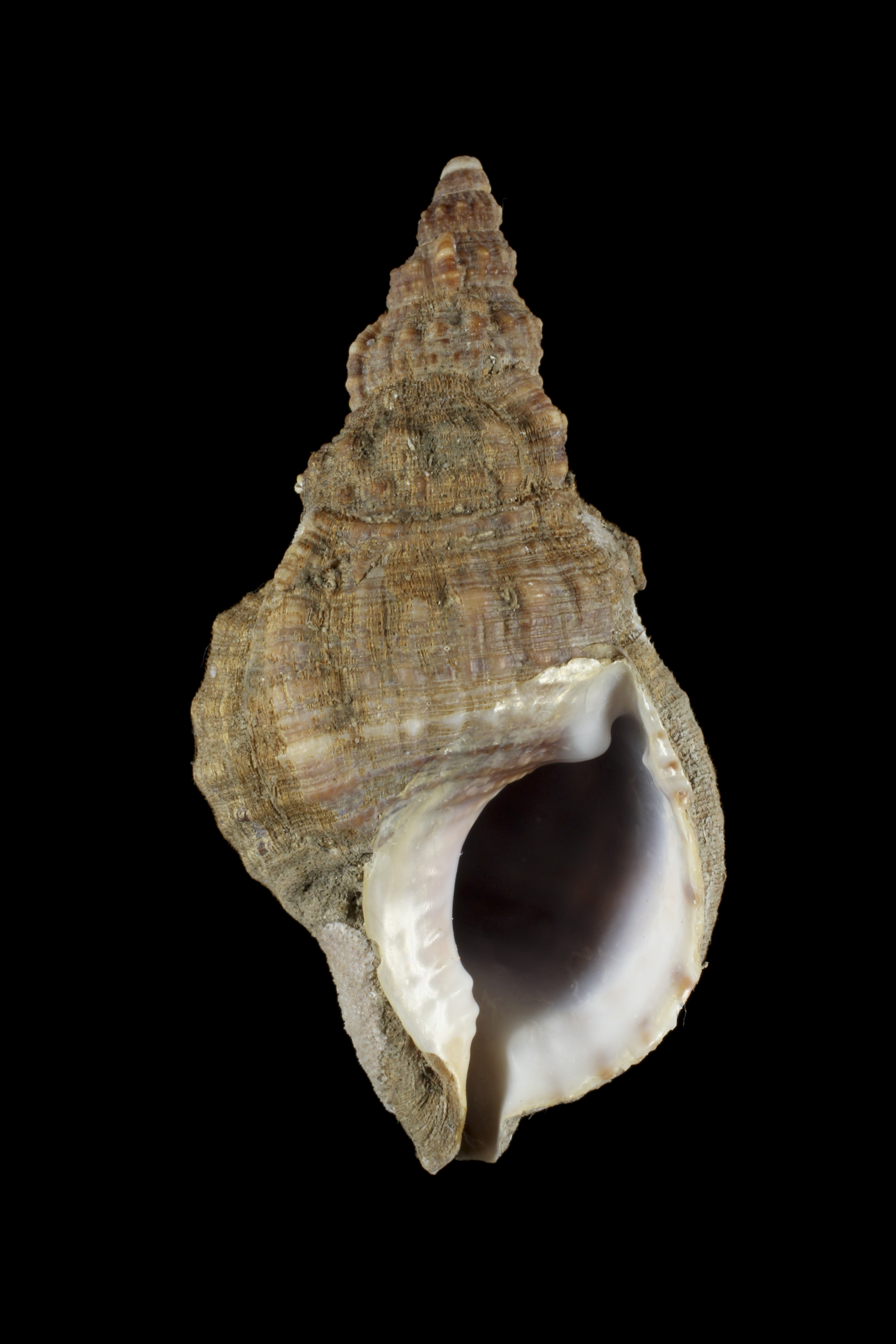
- Shell of Austrotriton subdistortus (specimen at MNHN, Paris)

Scientific classification
- Kingdom: Animalia
- Phylum: Mollusca
- Class: Gastropoda
- Subclass: Caenogastropoda
- Order: Littorinimorpha
- Family: Cymatiidae
- Genus: Austrotriton
- Species: A. subdistortus

Binomial name
- Austrotriton subdistortus (Lamarck, 1822)

Synonyms
- Negyrina delecta Cotton, 1945; Sassia subdistorta (Lamarck, 1822); Triton subdistorta Lamarck, 1822; Tritonium granulatum Dunker, 1871

= Austrotriton subdistortus =

Species of gastropod

Austrotriton subdistortus is a species of predatory sea snail, a marine gastropod mollusk in the family Cymatiidae.

== Description ==
Shell size 39 mm.

== Distribution ==
This marine species occurs off Tasmania.
