= Austrotriton garrardi =

Scientific classification
- Kingdom: Animalia
- Phylum: Mollusca
- Class: Gastropoda
- Subclass: Caenogastropoda
- Order: Littorinimorpha
- Family: Cymatiidae
- Genus: Austrotriton
- Species: A. garrardi

Binomial name
- Austrotriton garrardi Beu, 1970

Synonyms
- Sassia garrardi (Beu, 1970)

Species of gastropod

Austrotriton garrardi is a species of predatory sea snail, a marine gastropod mollusk in the family Cymatiidae.
