= Cymatona kampyla =

Scientific classification
- Kingdom: Animalia
- Phylum: Mollusca
- Class: Gastropoda
- Subclass: Caenogastropoda
- Order: Littorinimorpha
- Family: Cymatiidae
- Genus: Cymatona
- Species: C. kampyla

Binomial name
- Cymatona kampyla (R.B. Watson, 1885)

Synonyms
- Cymatona tomlini Powell, 1955; Nassaria kampyla R.B. Watson, 1883 (original combination); Sassia kampyla (R. B. Watson, 1883)

Species of gastropod

Cymatona kampyla is a species of sea snail, a marine gastropod mollusc in the family Cymatiidae.
