= Cymatona philomelae =

Scientific classification
- Kingdom: Animalia
- Phylum: Mollusca
- Class: Gastropoda
- Subclass: Caenogastropoda
- Order: Littorinimorpha
- Family: Cymatiidae
- Genus: Cymatona
- Species: C. philomelae

Binomial name
- Cymatona philomelae (Watson, 1881)

Synonyms
- Sassia philomelae (Watson, 1881); Triton philomelae Watson, 1881

Species of gastropod

Cymatona philomelae is a species of predatory sea snail, a marine gastropod mollusk in the family Cymatiidae.

== Description ==
The maximum recorded shell length is 29 mm.

== Habitat ==
Minimum recorded depth is 183 m. Maximum recorded depth is 274 m.
