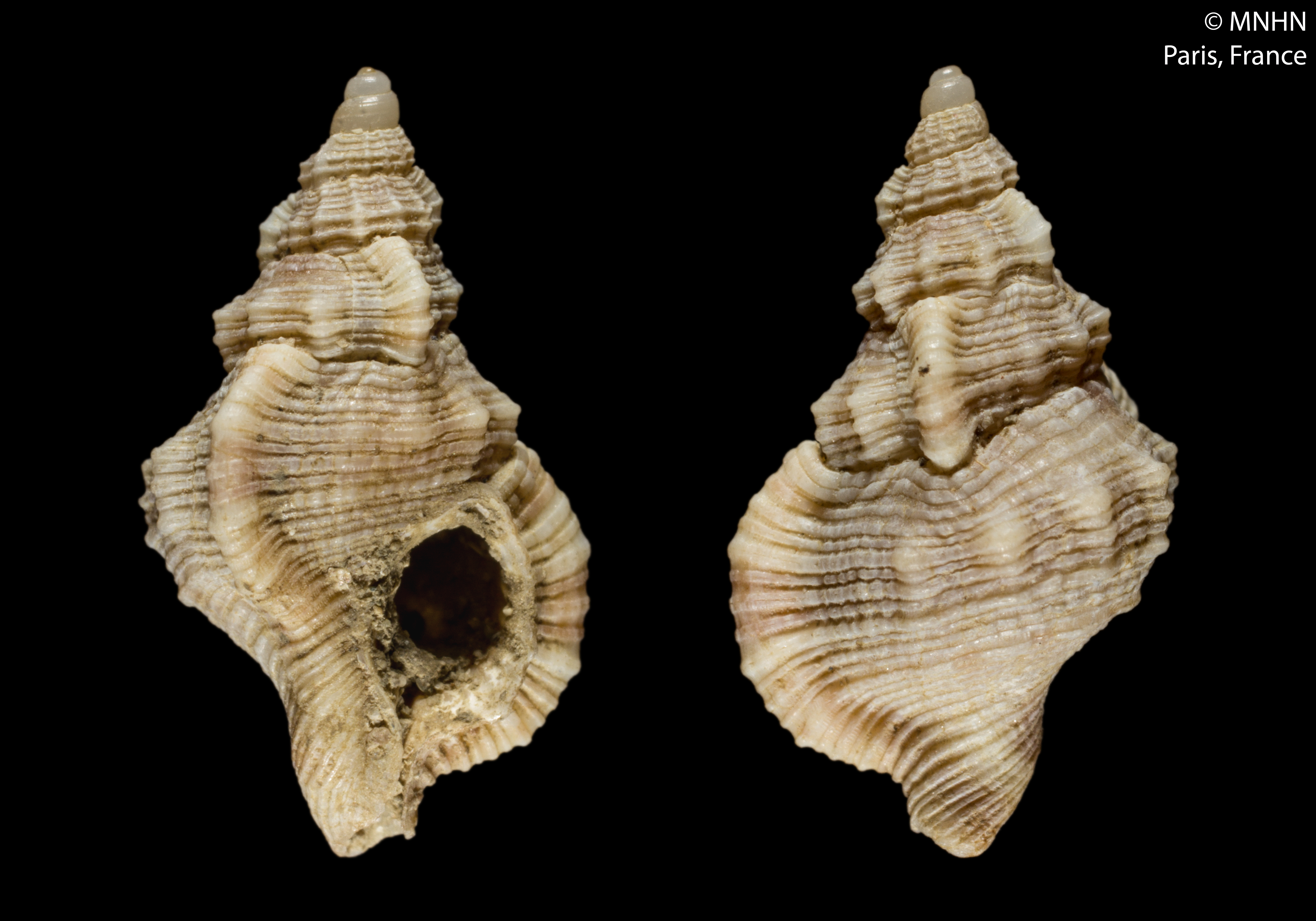
- Shell of Austrosassia ponderi (paratype at MNHN, Paris)

Scientific classification
- Kingdom: Animalia
- Phylum: Mollusca
- Class: Gastropoda
- Subclass: Caenogastropoda
- Order: Littorinimorpha
- Family: Cymatiidae
- Genus: Austrosassia
- Species: A. ponderi

Binomial name
- Austrosassia ponderi (Beu, 1987)

Synonyms
- Sassia ponderi Beu, 1987

= Austrosassia ponderi =

Species of gastropod

Austrosassia ponderi is a species of predatory sea snail, a marine gastropod mollusk in the family Cymatiidae.
