= Austrotriton mimetica =

Scientific classification
- Kingdom: Animalia
- Phylum: Mollusca
- Class: Gastropoda
- Subclass: Caenogastropoda
- Order: Littorinimorpha
- Family: Cymatiidae
- Genus: Austrotriton
- Species: A. mimetica

Binomial name
- Austrotriton mimetica (Tate, 1893)

Synonyms
- Sassia mimetica (Tate, 1893); Sipho mimetica Tate, 1893

Species of gastropod

Austrotriton mimetica is a species of predatory sea snail, a marine gastropod mollusk in the family Cymatiidae.
