= Austrotriton epitrema =

Scientific classification
- Kingdom: Animalia
- Phylum: Mollusca
- Class: Gastropoda
- Subclass: Caenogastropoda
- Order: Littorinimorpha
- Family: Cymatiidae
- Genus: Austrotriton
- Species: A. epitrema

Binomial name
- Austrotriton epitrema (Tenison Woods, 1877)

Synonyms
- Ranella epitrema Tenison Woods, 1877; Sassia epitrema (Tenison Woods, 1877)

Species of gastropod

Austrotriton epitrema is a species of predatory sea snail, a marine gastropod mollusk in the family Cymatiidae.
