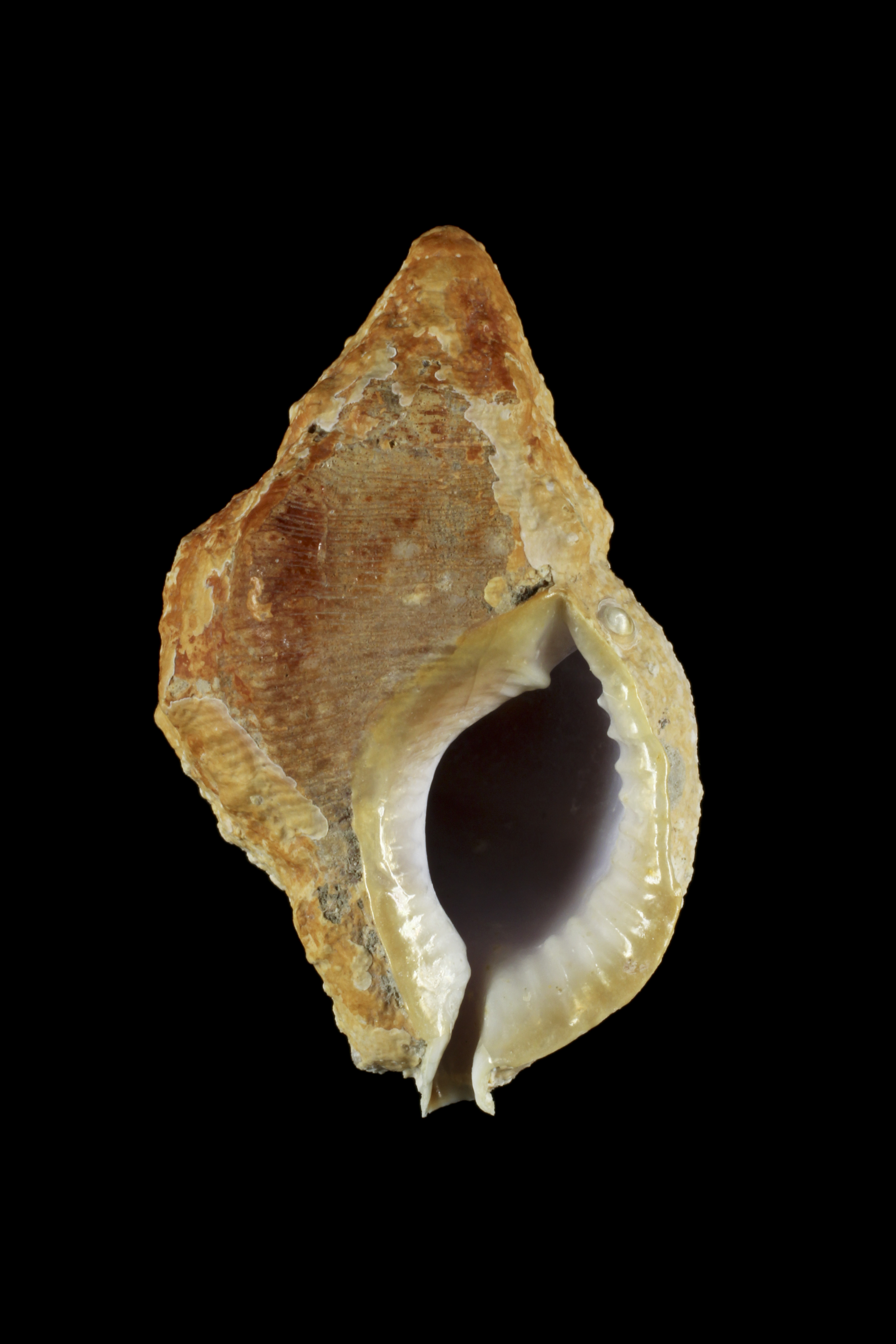
- Shell of Austrotriton bassi (specimen at MNHN, Paris)

Scientific classification
- Kingdom: Animalia
- Phylum: Mollusca
- Class: Gastropoda
- Subclass: Caenogastropoda
- Order: Littorinimorpha
- Family: Cymatiidae
- Genus: Austrotriton
- Species: A. bassi

Binomial name
- Austrotriton bassi (Angas, 1869)

Synonyms
- Sassia bassi (Angas, 1869); Triton bassi Angas, 1869; Tritonium fraterculus Dunker, 1871

= Austrotriton bassi =

Species of gastropod

Austrotriton bassi is a species of predatory sea snail, a marine gastropod mollusk in the family Cymatiidae.

== Distribution ==
This marine species occurs in the Bass Strait off Tasmania
