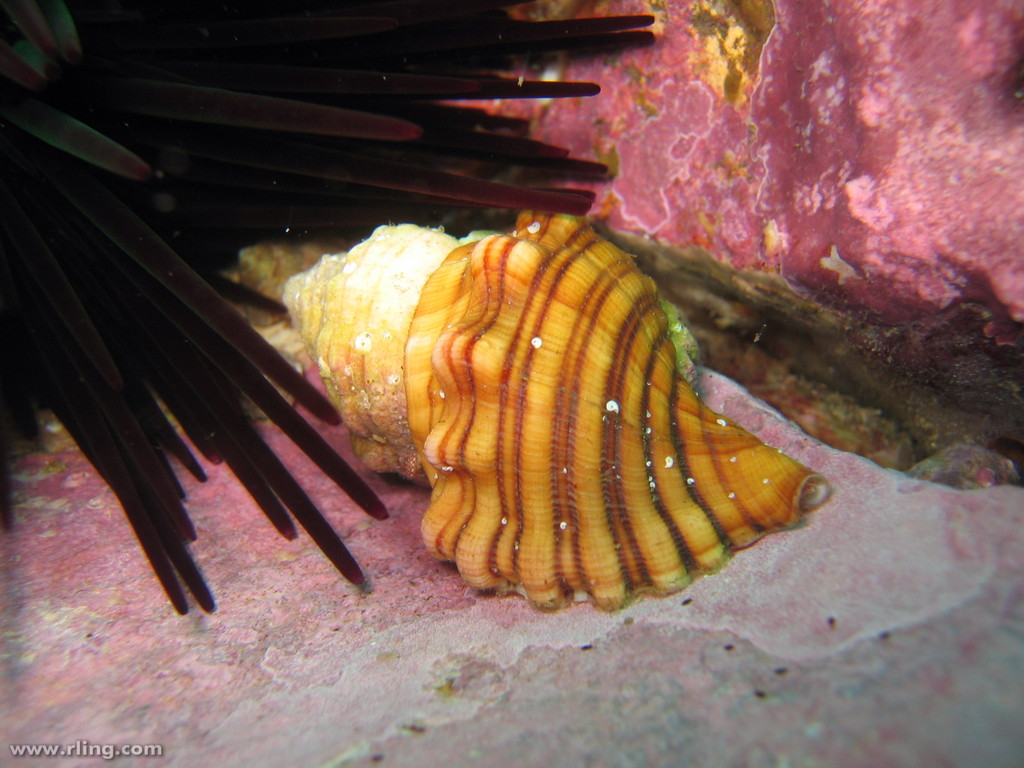
- A live individual of Cabestana spengleri in situ

Scientific classification
- Kingdom: Animalia
- Phylum: Mollusca
- Class: Gastropoda
- Subclass: Caenogastropoda
- Order: Littorinimorpha
- Superfamily: Tonnoidea
- Family: Cymatiidae
- Genus: Cabestana
- Species: C. spengleri

Binomial name
- Cabestana spengleri (Perry, 1811)

Synonyms
- Cabestana spengleri procerum (Iredale, 1929); Cymatium spengleri (Perry, 1811); Cymatium spengleri procerum Iredale, 1929; Murex spengleri Dillwyn, 1817; Septa spengleri Perry, 1811 (original combination); Triton (Cabestana) boltenianus A. Adams, 1855; Triton barthelemyi Bernardi, 1857; Triton boltenianus A. Adams, 1855 ·

= Cabestana spengleri =

Species of gastropod

Cabestana spengleri, or Spengler's trumpet, is a large predatory sea snail, sometimes called a predatory whelk, a marine gastropod mollusc in the family Cymatiidae. This species is named after the Danish naturalist Lorenz Spengler.

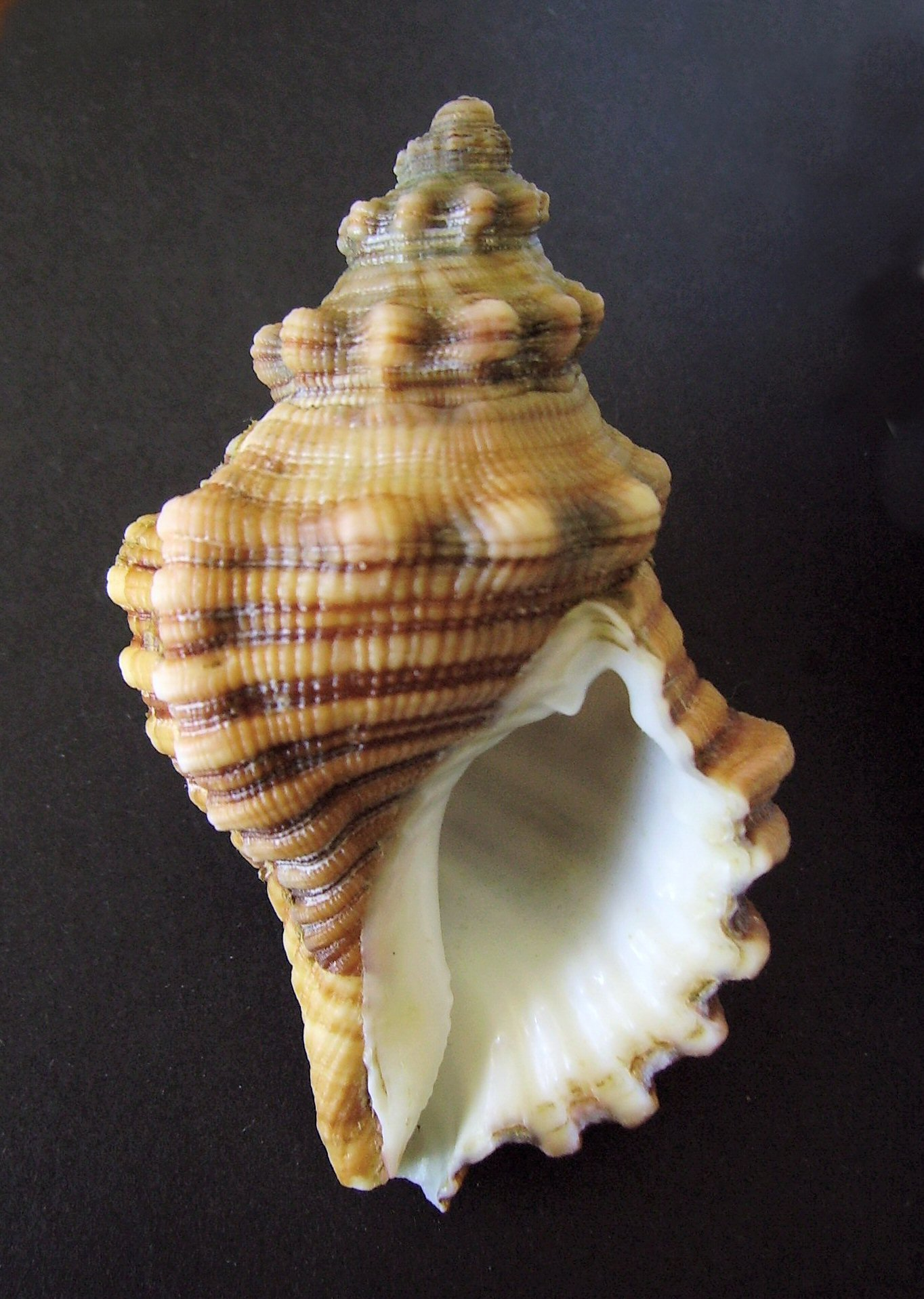
An apertural view of a shell of Cabestana spengleri

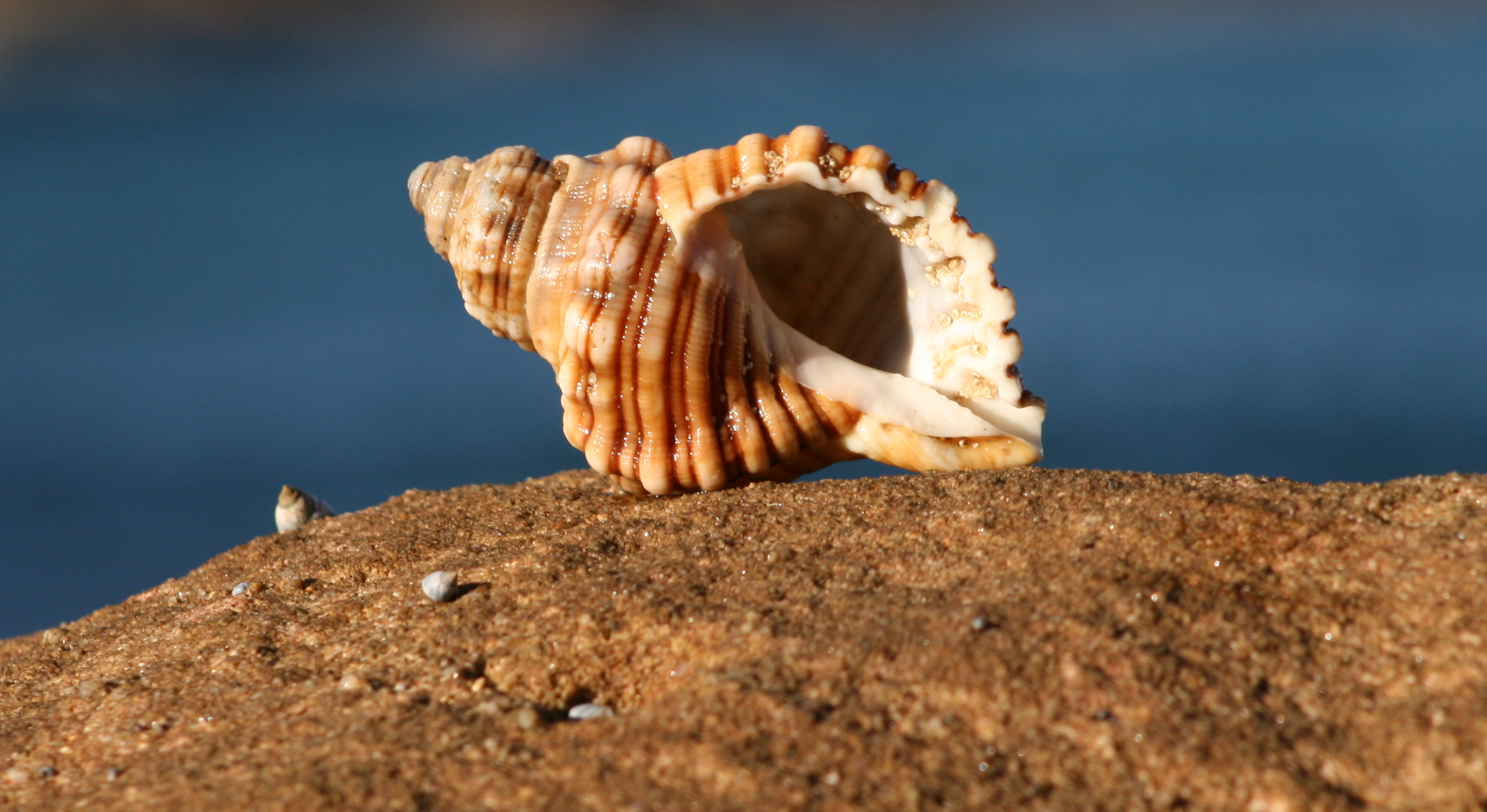
A shell of Cabestana spengleri on the foreshore near MacMasters beach

== Description ==
The length of the shell attains 153 mm.

== Distribution ==
This marine species occurs off New Zealand (Chatham Island and Kermadec Islands) and Australia (New South Wales, Queensland, South Australia, Tasmania, Victoria, and Western Australia).

== Human Usage ==
Edible: sold in fish shops in New South Wales, Australia.
