= Austrotriton petulans =

Scientific classification
- Kingdom: Animalia
- Phylum: Mollusca
- Class: Gastropoda
- Subclass: Caenogastropoda
- Order: Littorinimorpha
- Family: Cymatiidae
- Genus: Austrotriton
- Species: A. petulans

Binomial name
- Austrotriton petulans (Hedley & May, 1908)

Synonyms
- Sassia petulans (Hedley & May, 1908); Triton petulans Hedley & May, 1908

Species of gastropod

Austrotriton petulans is a species of predatory sea snail, a marine gastropod mollusk in the family Cymatiidae.
