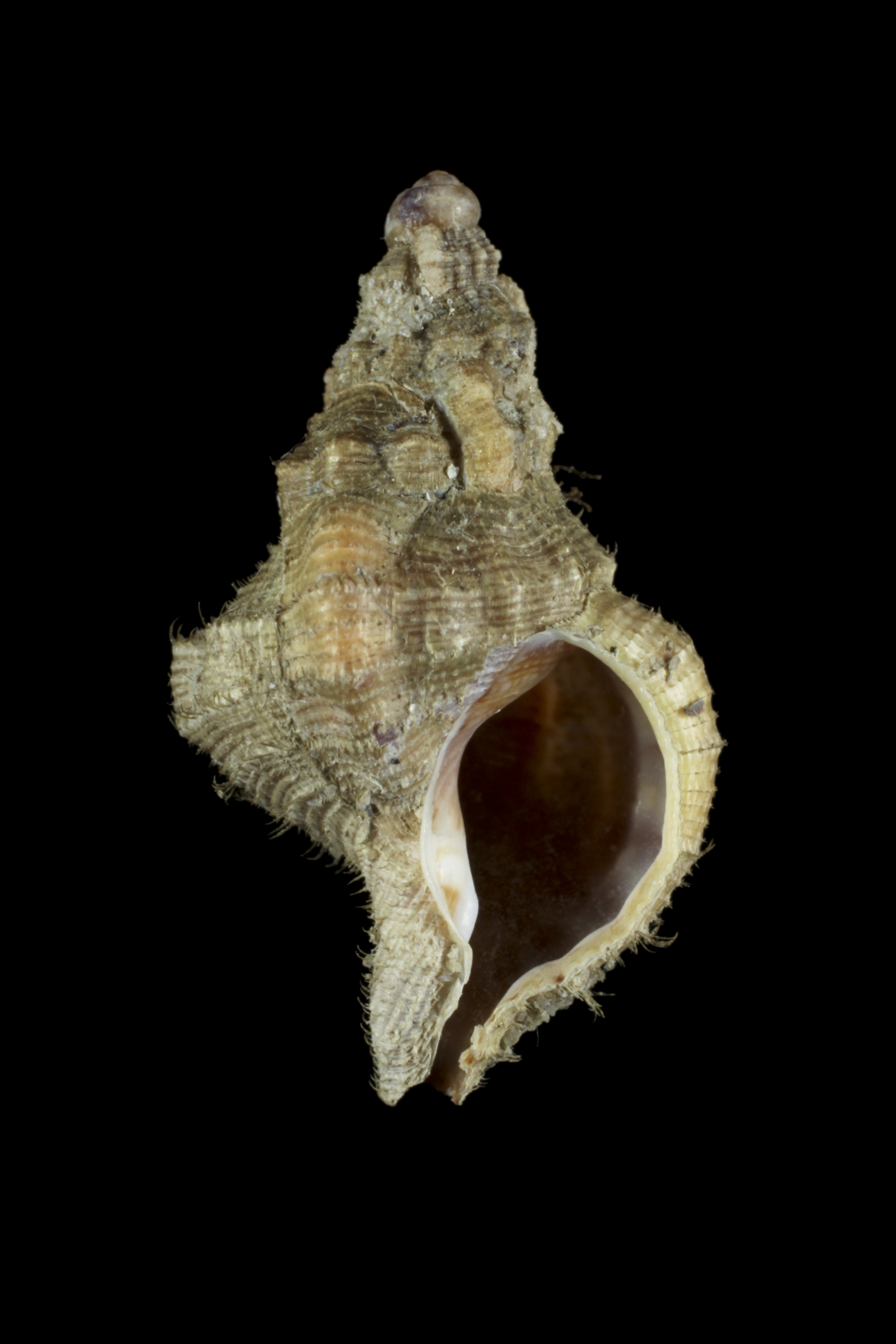
- Shell of Austrosassia parkinsonia (specimen at MNHN, Paris)

Scientific classification
- Kingdom: Animalia
- Phylum: Mollusca
- Class: Gastropoda
- Subclass: Caenogastropoda
- Order: Littorinimorpha
- Family: Cymatiidae
- Genus: Austrosassia
- Species: A. parkinsonia

Binomial name
- Austrosassia parkinsonia (Perry, 1811)

Synonyms
- Austrosassia parkinsoniana [sic] (misspelling); Austrotriton parkinsonius (Perry, 1811); Austrotriton parkinsonius basilicus Iredale, 1924; Sassia lindneri Parth, 1992; Sassia parkinsonia (Perry, 1811); Septa parkinsonia Perry, 1811 (original combination); Triton fusiformis Kiener, 1842

= Austrosassia parkinsonia =

Species of gastropod

Austrosassia parkinsonia is a species of predatory sea snail, a marine gastropod mollusk in the family Cymatiidae.
