= Monoplex keenae =

Scientific classification
- Kingdom: Animalia
- Phylum: Mollusca
- Class: Gastropoda
- Subclass: Caenogastropoda
- Order: Littorinimorpha
- Family: Cymatiidae
- Genus: Monoplex
- Species: M. keenae

Binomial name
- Monoplex keenae (Beu, 1970)

Synonyms
- Cymatium parthenopeum keenae (Beu, 1970); Septa (Monoplex) parthenopea keenae Beu, 1970

Species of gastropod

Monoplex keenae is a species of predatory sea snail, a marine gastropod mollusk in the family Cymatiidae.
