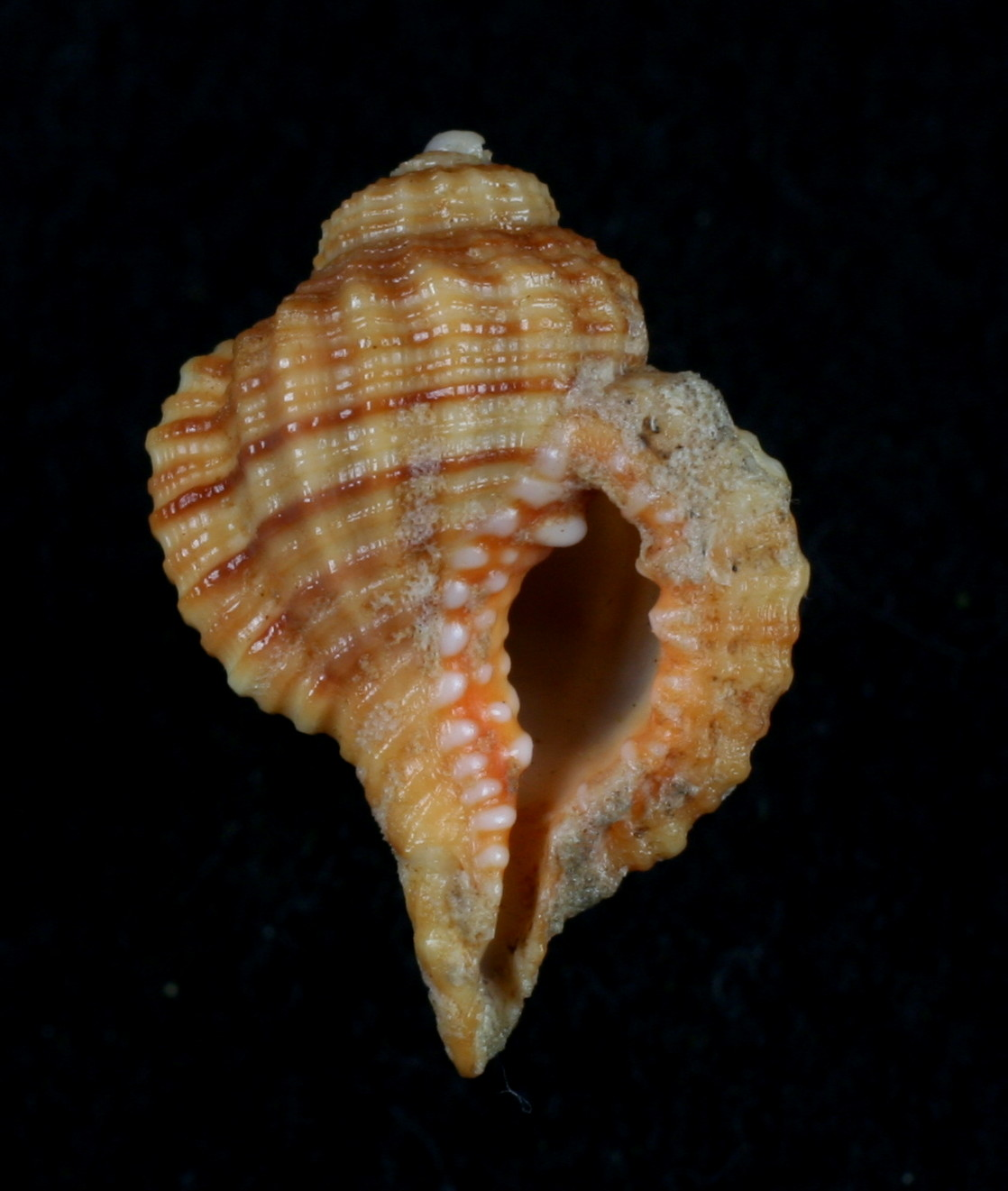
- Apertural view of Monoplex lignarius (Broderip, 1833)

Scientific classification
- Kingdom: Animalia
- Phylum: Mollusca
- Class: Gastropoda
- Subclass: Caenogastropoda
- Order: Littorinimorpha
- Family: Cymatiidae
- Genus: Monoplex
- Species: M. lignarius

Binomial name
- Monoplex lignarius (Broderip, 1833)

Synonyms
- Triton lignarius Broderip, 1833

= Monoplex lignarius =

Species of gastropod

Monoplex lignarius is a species of predatory sea snail, a marine gastropod mollusk in the family Cymatiidae.
