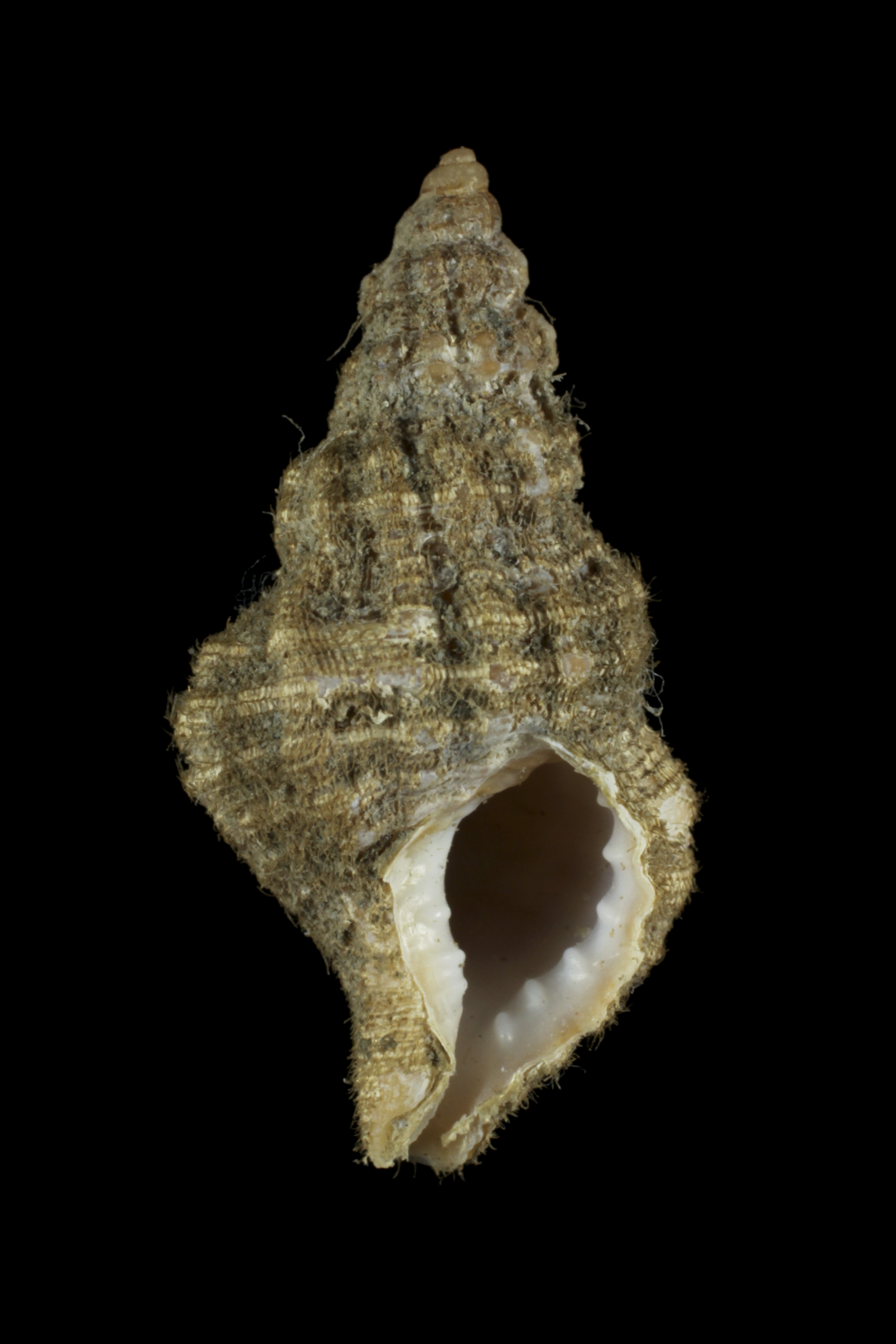

Scientific classification
- Kingdom: Animalia
- Phylum: Mollusca
- Class: Gastropoda
- Subclass: Caenogastropoda
- Order: Littorinimorpha
- Family: Cymatiidae
- Genus: Cymatiella
- Species: C. verrucosa

Binomial name
- Cymatiella verrucosa (Reeve, 1844)

Synonyms
- Cymatiella peroniana Iredale, 1929; Triton quoyi Reeve, 1844; Triton verrucosa Reeve, 1844

= Cymatiella verrucosa =

Species of gastropod

Cymatiella verrucosa is a species of predatory sea snail in the family Cymatiidae.
