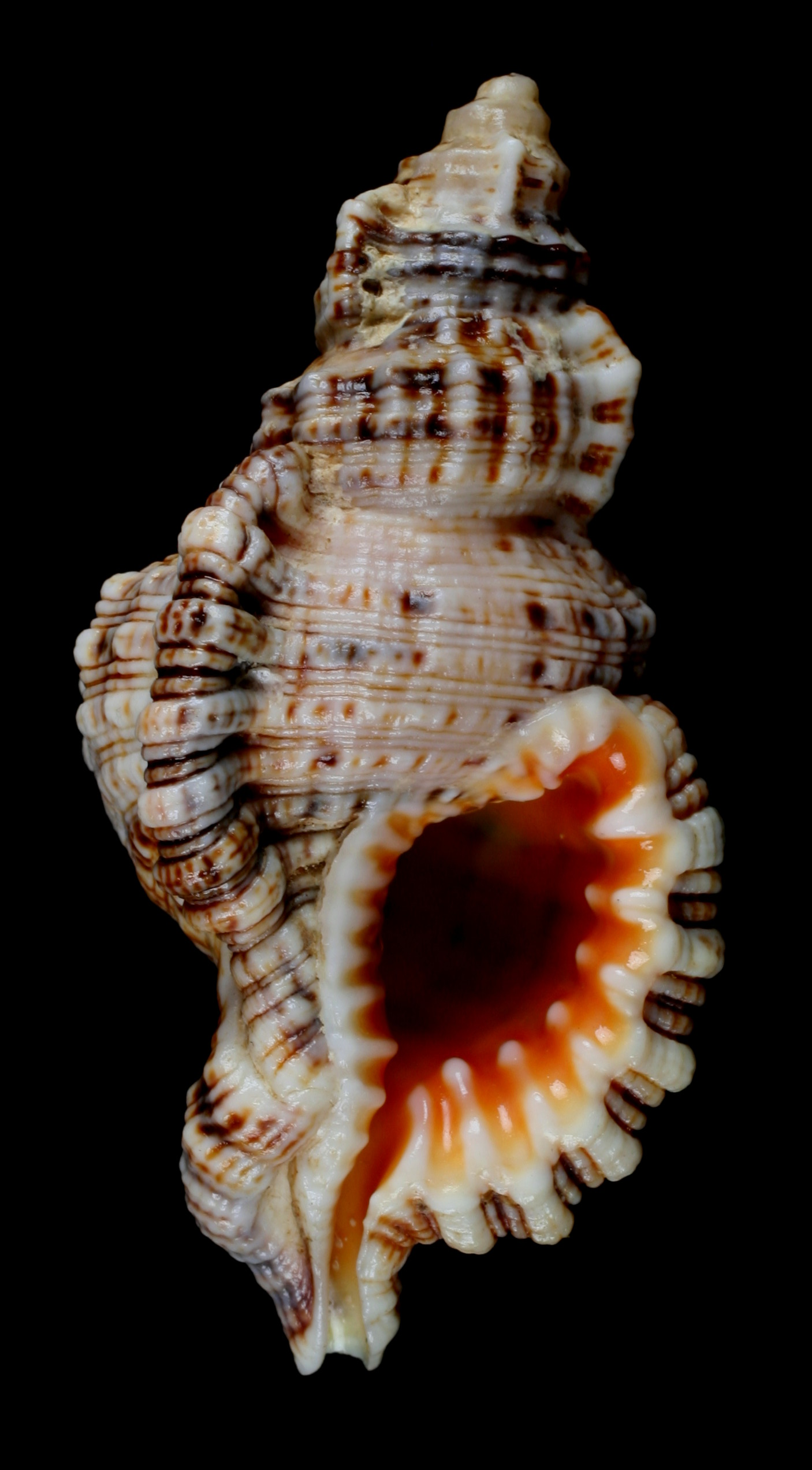
- Apertural view

Scientific classification
- Kingdom: Animalia
- Phylum: Mollusca
- Class: Gastropoda
- Subclass: Caenogastropoda
- Order: Littorinimorpha
- Family: Cymatiidae
- Genus: Monoplex
- Species: M. nicobaricus

Binomial name
- Monoplex nicobaricus (Röding, 1798)

Synonyms
- Cymatium nicobaricum (Röding, 1798); Lampusia nicobarica (Röding, 1798); Triton chlorostomum Lamarck, 1822; Triton chlorostomum var. pumilio Mörch, 1877; Triton pulchellus C. B. Adams, 1850; Tritonium adansonii Dunker, R.W., 1853; Tritonium lotorium Link, H.F., 1807; Tritonium nicobarius Röding, 1798 (basionym)

= Monoplex nicobaricus =

Species of gastropod

Monoplex nicobaricus, known as the Nicobar hairy triton or goldmouth triton, is a species of medium-sized predatory sea snail, a tropical marine gastropod mollusc in the family Cymatiidae.

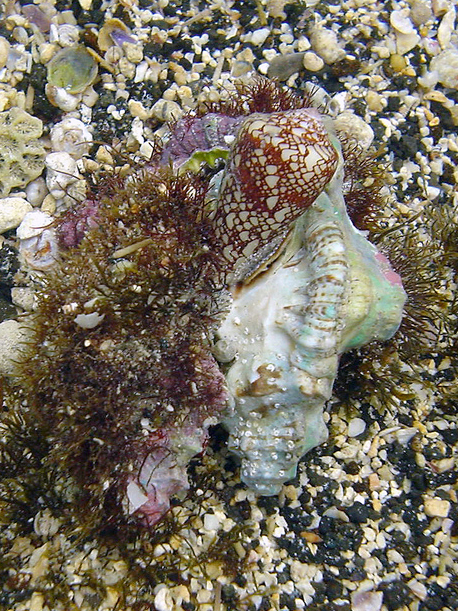
In Hawaii, a group of three Monoplex nicobaricus (probably a mating pair and another male) feasting on Conus pennaceus, Monoplex nicobaricus is well known for actively hunting Conidae species.

== Distribution ==
This species of marine snail has a wide distribution and lives in the Indo-Pacific and Western Atlantic oceans. Regions where Monoplex nicobaricus is found include Aldabra, Brazil, Canaries, Cape Verde, Chagos, Costa Rica, European waters, Florida, Gulf of Mexico, Mascarene Basin and West Indies.

== Description ==
The maximum recorded shell length is 90 mm.

== Habitat ==
The minimum recorded depth is at the surface and the maximum recorded depth is 36 m (118 ft).

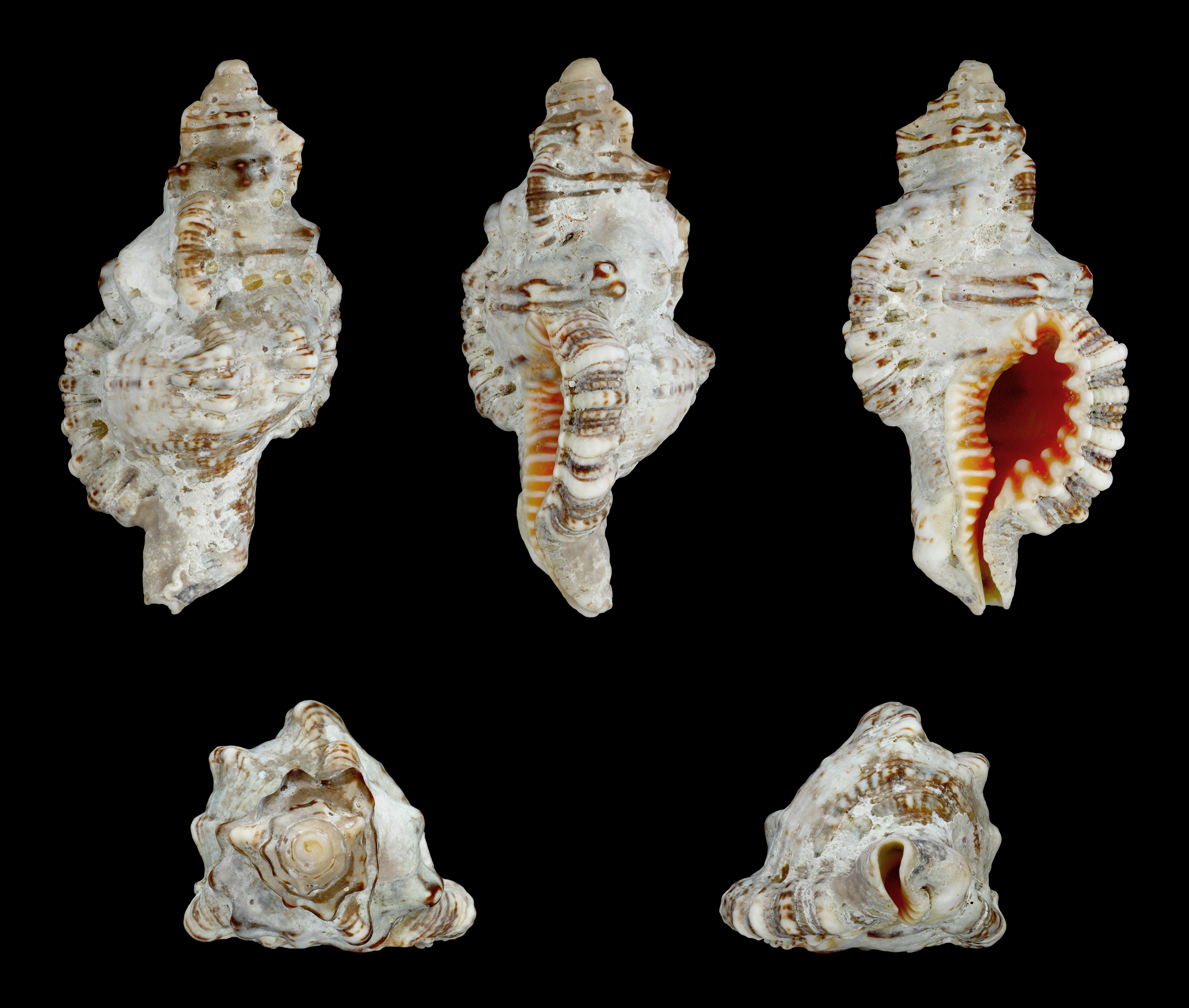
Shells of Monoplex nicobaricus
