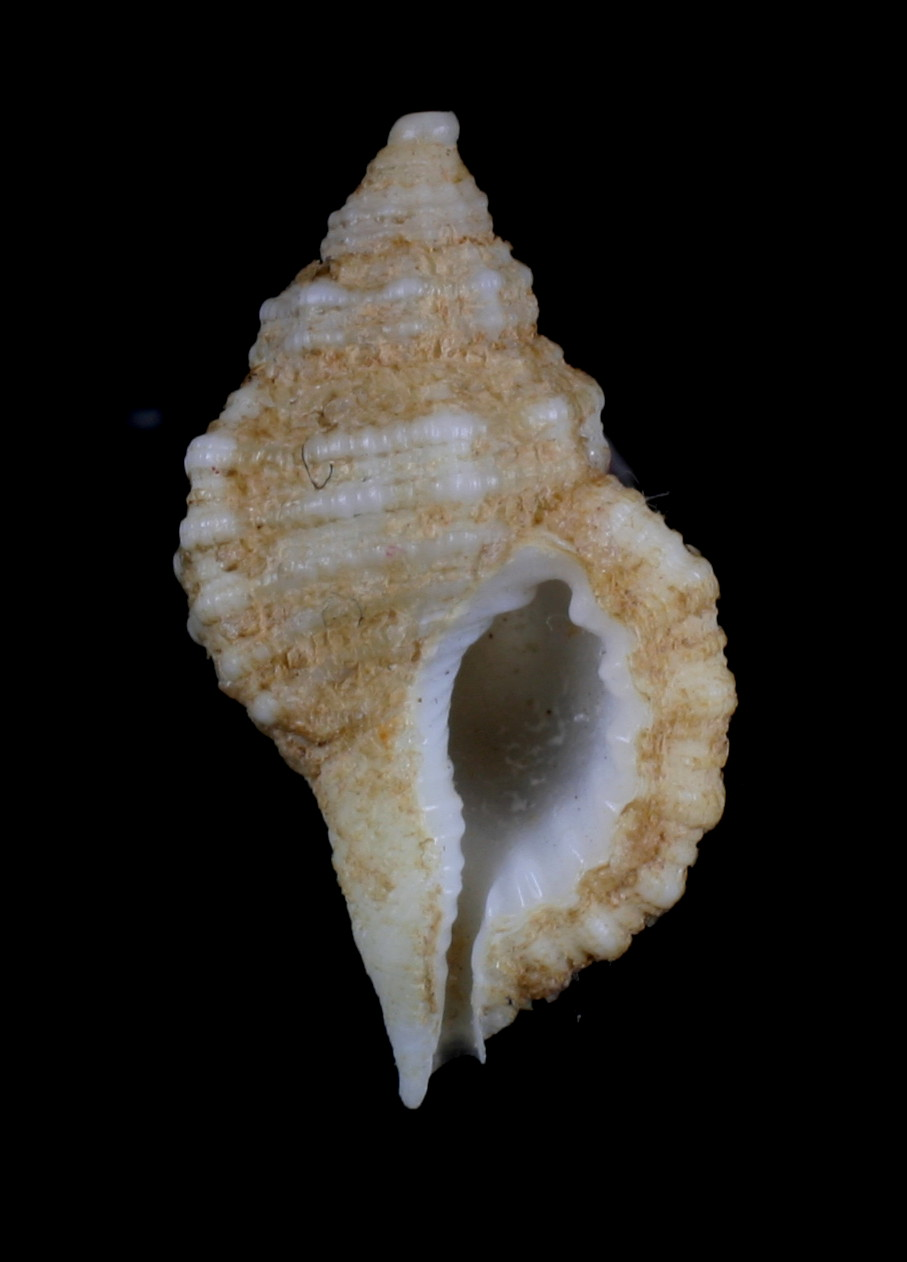
- Apertural view of Monoplex mundus (Gould, 1849)

Scientific classification
- Kingdom: Animalia
- Phylum: Mollusca
- Class: Gastropoda
- Subclass: Caenogastropoda
- Order: Littorinimorpha
- Family: Cymatiidae
- Genus: Monoplex
- Species: M. mundus

Binomial name
- Monoplex mundus (Gould, 1849)

Synonyms
- Cymatium mundum (Gould, 1849); Triton mundus Gould, 1849; Tritonium mauritianum Tapparone-Canefri, 1876

= Monoplex mundus =

Species of gastropod

Monoplex mundus is a species of predatory sea snail, a marine gastropod mollusk in the family Cymatiidae.

== Distribution ==
This marine species occurs in the Gulf of Mexico and in the Indian Ocean off the Mascarene Basin.

== Description ==
The maximum recorded shell length is 38 mm. The species was discovered in 1849 by A. Gould. It was originally classified as Triton mundum.

== Habitat ==
Minimum recorded depth is 149 m. Maximum recorded depth is 185 m.
