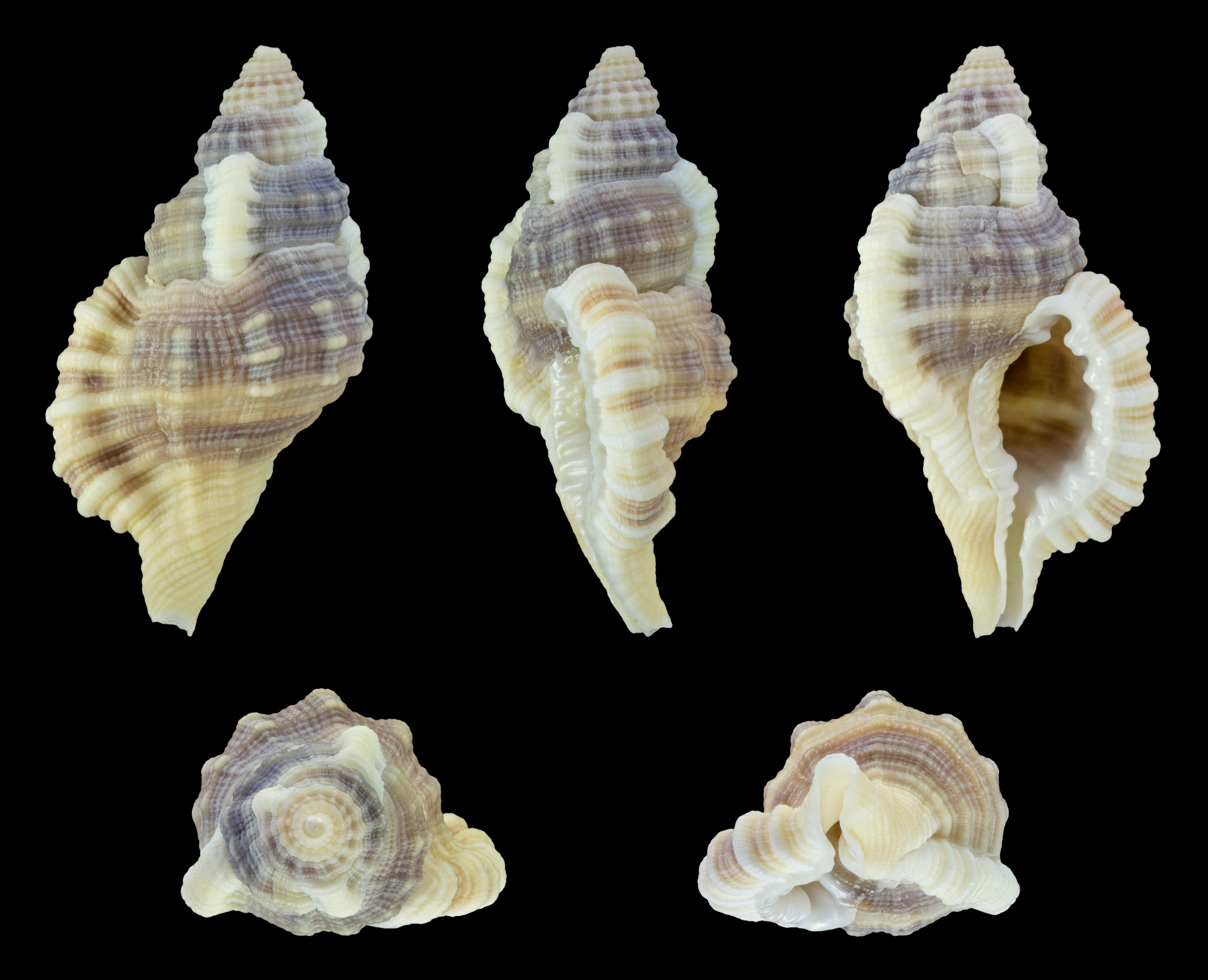
- Monoplex gemmatus shells

Scientific classification
- Kingdom: Animalia
- Phylum: Mollusca
- Class: Gastropoda
- Subclass: Caenogastropoda
- Order: Littorinimorpha
- Family: Cymatiidae
- Genus: Monoplex
- Species: M. gemmatus

Binomial name
- Monoplex gemmatus (Reeve, 1844)

Synonyms
- Cymatium gemmatum (Reeve, 1844); Cymatium (Monoplex) gemmatum (Reeve, L.A., 1844); Septa gemmata (Reeve, 1844); Triton gemmatus Reeve, 1844

= Monoplex gemmatus =

Species of gastropod

Monoplex gemmatus (also known as jeweled triton or beaded triton), is a species of predatory sea snail, a marine gastropod mollusk in the family Cymatiidae.

== Description ==
The shell size varies between 20 mm and 35 mm. Members of this species are mostly gonochoric and are broadcast spawners. Their embryos develops into planktonic (plankton) trocophore larva. Then their larva then would develop into juvenile veligers which will grow into full grown adults.

== Distribution ==
This species is distributed in the Indian Ocean along Mauritius, Mozambique, Tanzania and in the Western Pacific Ocean. They live in benthic or tropical waters and are commonly found in lagoon and seaward reef habitat.
