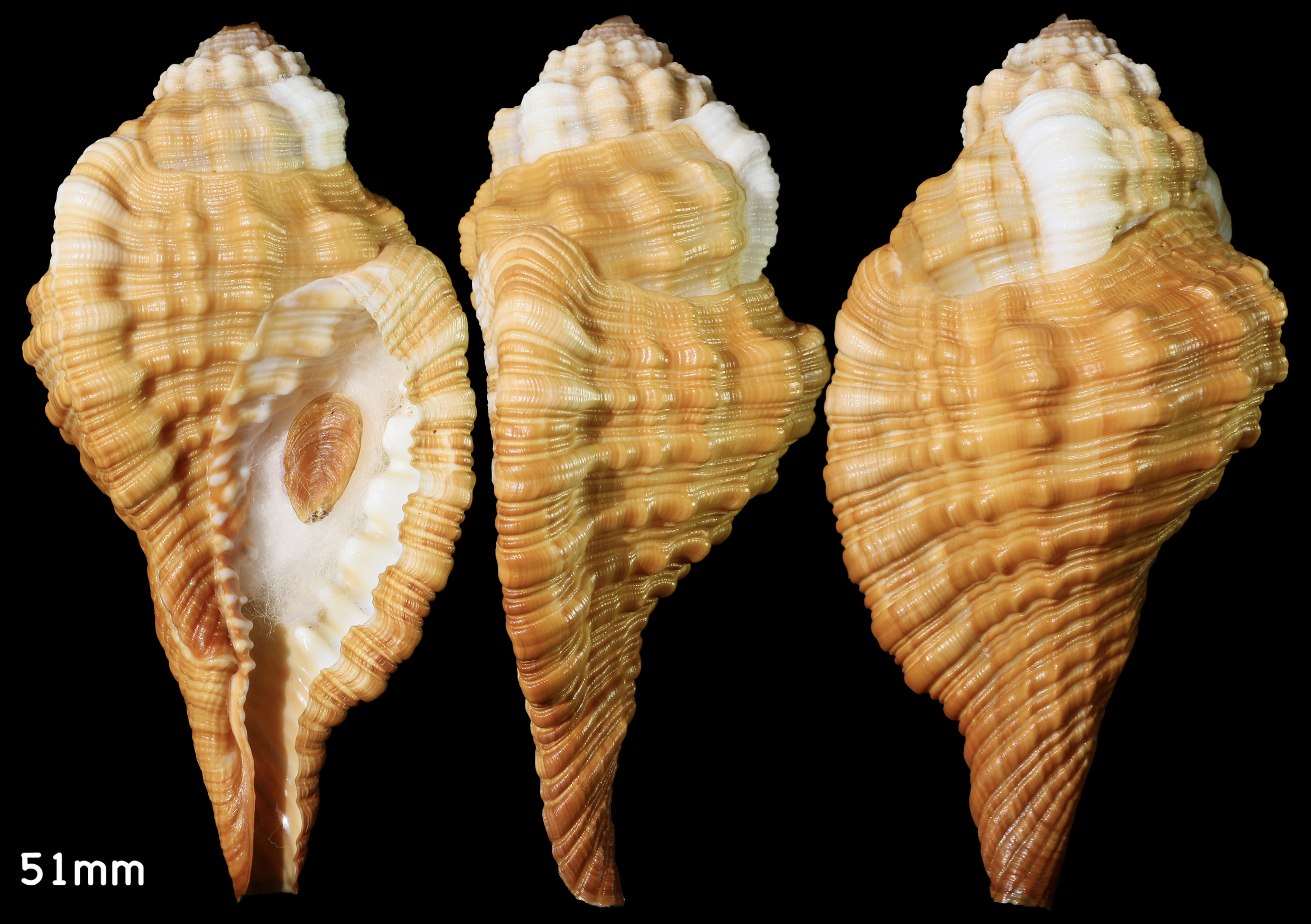

Scientific classification
- Kingdom: Animalia
- Phylum: Mollusca
- Class: Gastropoda
- Subclass: Caenogastropoda
- Order: Littorinimorpha
- Family: Cymatiidae
- Genus: Monoplex
- Species: M. trigonus

Binomial name
- Monoplex trigonus (Gmelin, 1791)

Synonyms
- Cymatium (Septa) trigonum (Gmelin, 1791); Cymatium (Monoplex) trigonum (Gmelin, J.F., 1791); Cymatium trigonum (Gmelin, 1791); Murex trigonus Gmelin, 1791; Tritonium ficoides L. A. Reeve, 1844; Triton caudatus Kiener, 1842; Triton ficoides Reeve, 1844; Triton samier Petit de la Saussaye, 1852

= Monoplex trigonus =

Species of gastropod

Monoplex trigonus, the trigonal hairy triton, is a species of predatory sea snail, a marine gastropod mollusk in the family Cymatiidae.

== Distribution ==
This species is found in the Atlantic Ocean (Cape Verde, West Africa, Gabon, Angola) and in the Caribbean Sea (Venezuela).

== Description ==
The shell size varies between 21 mm and 60 mm.

The maximum recorded shell length is 40 mm.

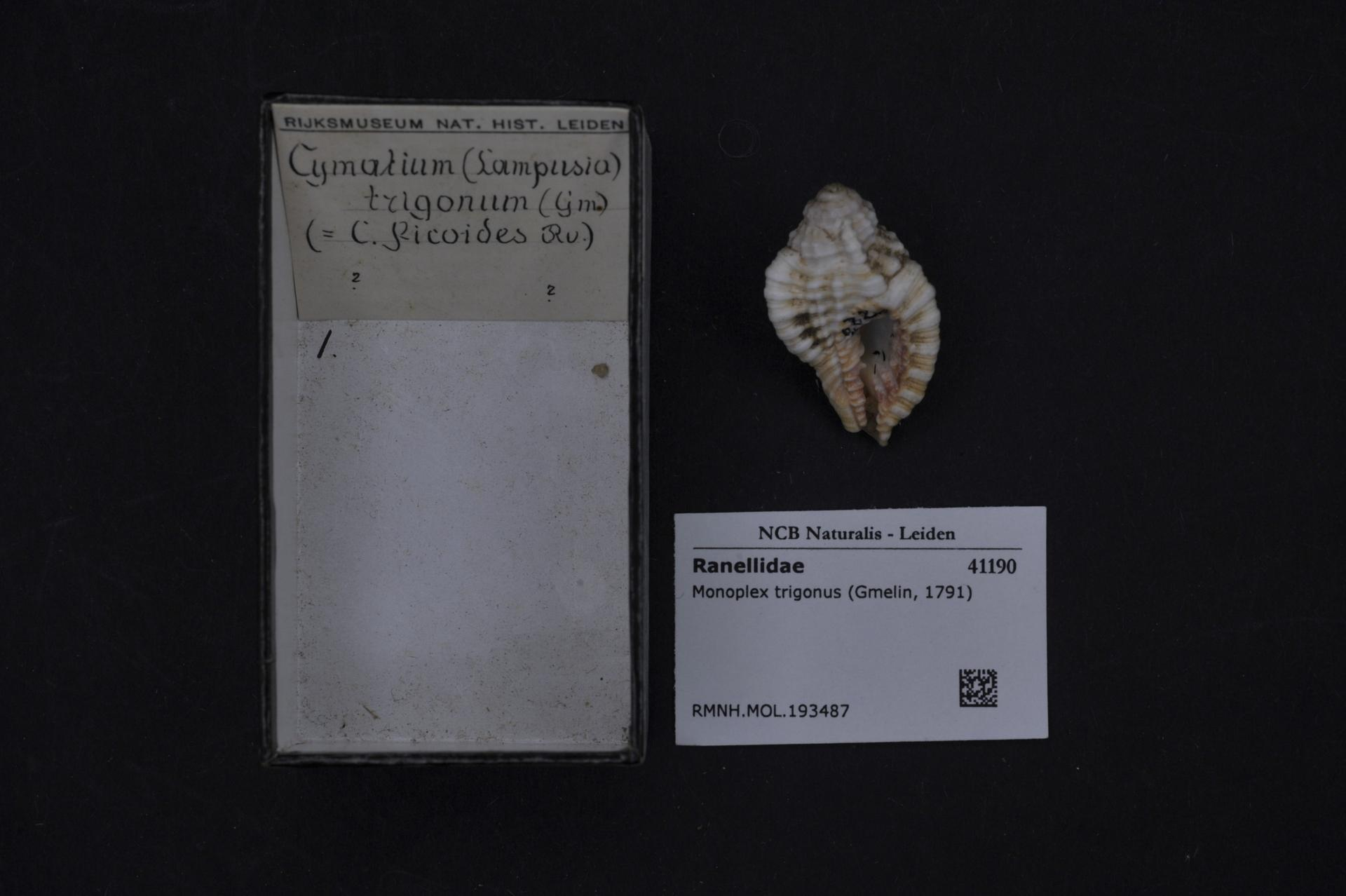
trigonal hairy triton

== Habitat ==
Minimum recorded depth is 15 m. Maximum recorded depth is 15 m.
