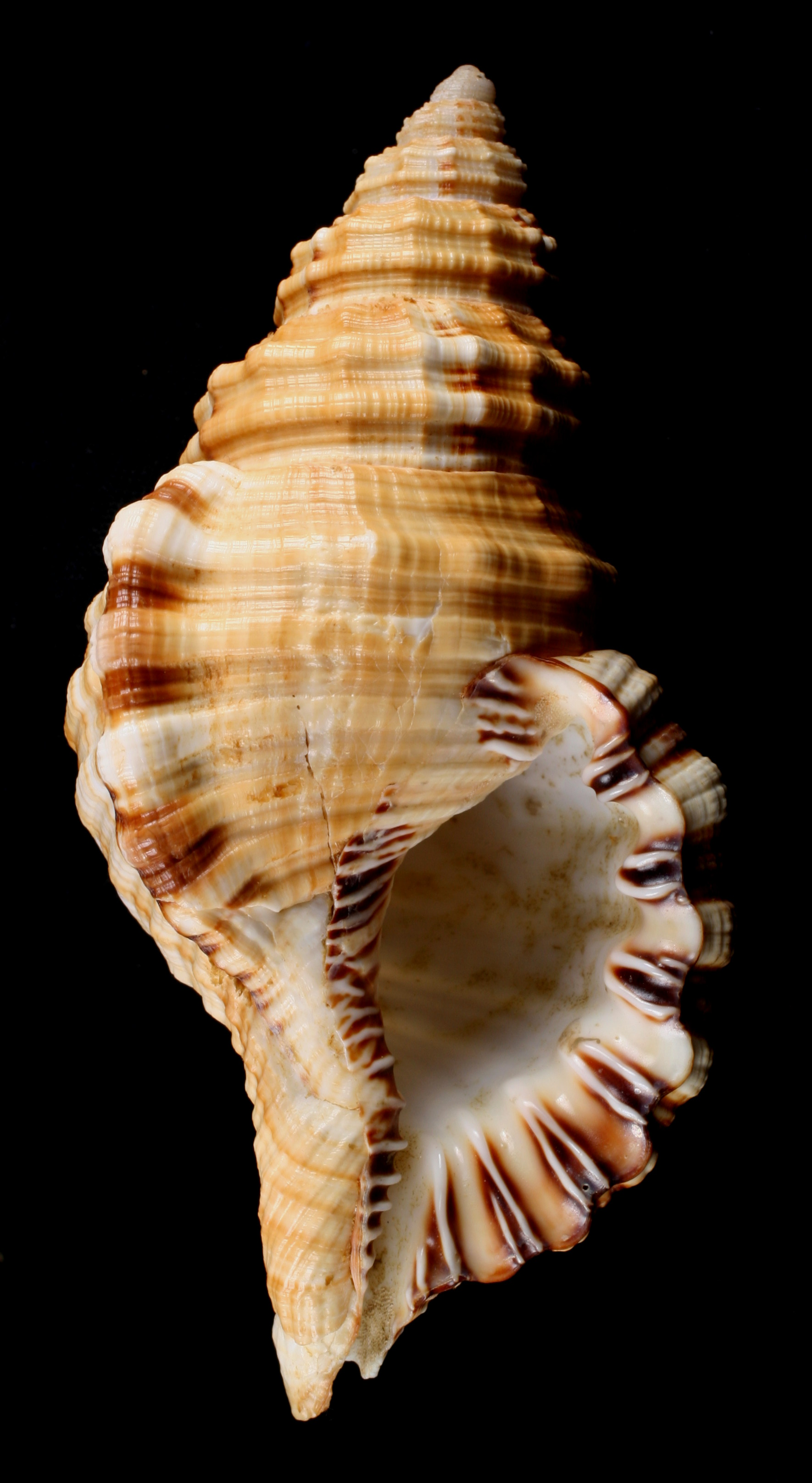
- Apertural view of Monoplex corrugatus

Scientific classification
- Kingdom: Animalia
- Phylum: Mollusca
- Class: Gastropoda
- Subclass: Caenogastropoda
- Order: Littorinimorpha
- Family: Cymatiidae
- Genus: Monoplex
- Species: M. corrugatus

Binomial name
- Monoplex corrugatus (Lamarck, 1816)

Synonyms
- Cymatium corrugatum (Lamarck, 1816); Cymatium corrugatum corrugatum (Lamarck, 1816); Murex pairodoa Risso, 1826 (dubious synonym); Simpulum corrugatum (Lamarck, 1816); Simpulum corrugatum var. minima Pallary, 1900; Simpulum corrugatum var. minor-obesa Pallary, 1900; Triton affinis Deshayes, 1835; Triton corrugatum Lamarck, 1816; Triton corrugatum var. intermidens de Gregorio, 1884; Triton corrugatum var. pantanellii de Gregorio, 1884; Triton corrugatum var. propetuberculifera de Gregorio, 1884; Triton corrugatum var. vivopse de Gregorio, 1884; Triton corrugatus Lamarck, 1816 (original combination)

= Monoplex corrugatus =

Species of gastropod

Monoplex corrugatus is a species of predatory sea snail, a marine gastropod mollusk in the family Cymatiidae.

== Description ==
Shells of Monoplex corrugatus can reach a size of 40–120 millimetres (1.6–4.7 in).

This species has a large white shell with conical whorls provided with irregular knots. The mollusk is yellowish with red spots with white edges. The hairy and brown periostracum completely covers the shell.

== Distribution and habitat ==
This species can be found from Bay of Biscay to Angola and in the Mediterranean sea. It lives on hard seabed at depths of 15 to 200 m.
