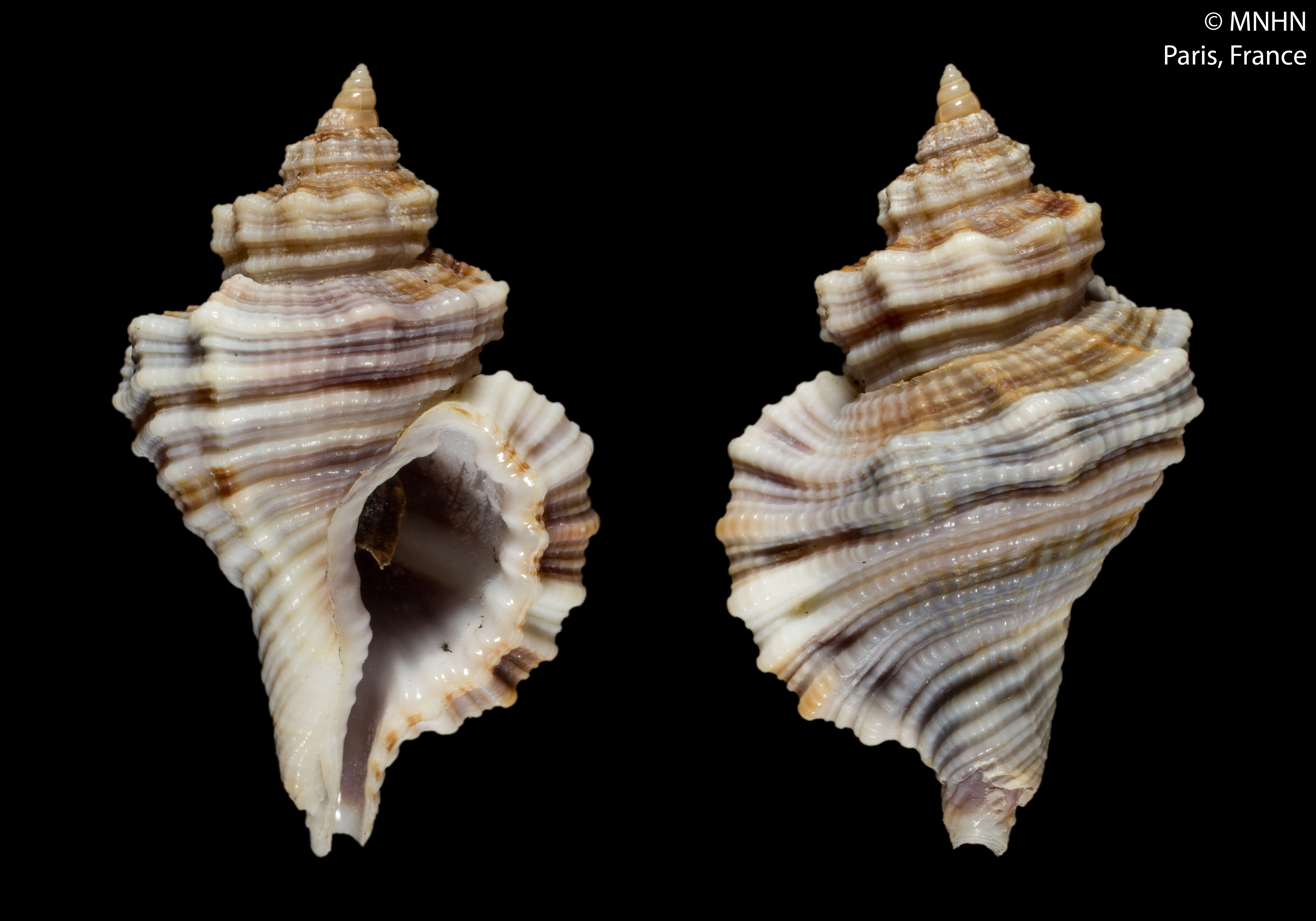
- Shell of Monoplex penniketi (holotype at MNHN, Paris)

Scientific classification
- Kingdom: Animalia
- Phylum: Mollusca
- Class: Gastropoda
- Subclass: Caenogastropoda
- Order: Littorinimorpha
- Superfamily: Tonnoidea
- Family: Cymatiidae
- Genus: Monoplex
- Species: M. penniketi

Binomial name
- Monoplex penniketi (Beu, 1998)

Synonyms
- Cymatium (Monoplex) penniketi Beu, 1998; Cymatium penniketi Beu, 1998 (original combination)

= Monoplex penniketi =

Species of gastropod

Monoplex penniketi is a species of predatory sea snail, a marine gastropod mollusk in the family Cymatiidae.

== Description ==
The length of the shell attains 35 mm.

== Distribution ==
This marine species occurs off Oman.
