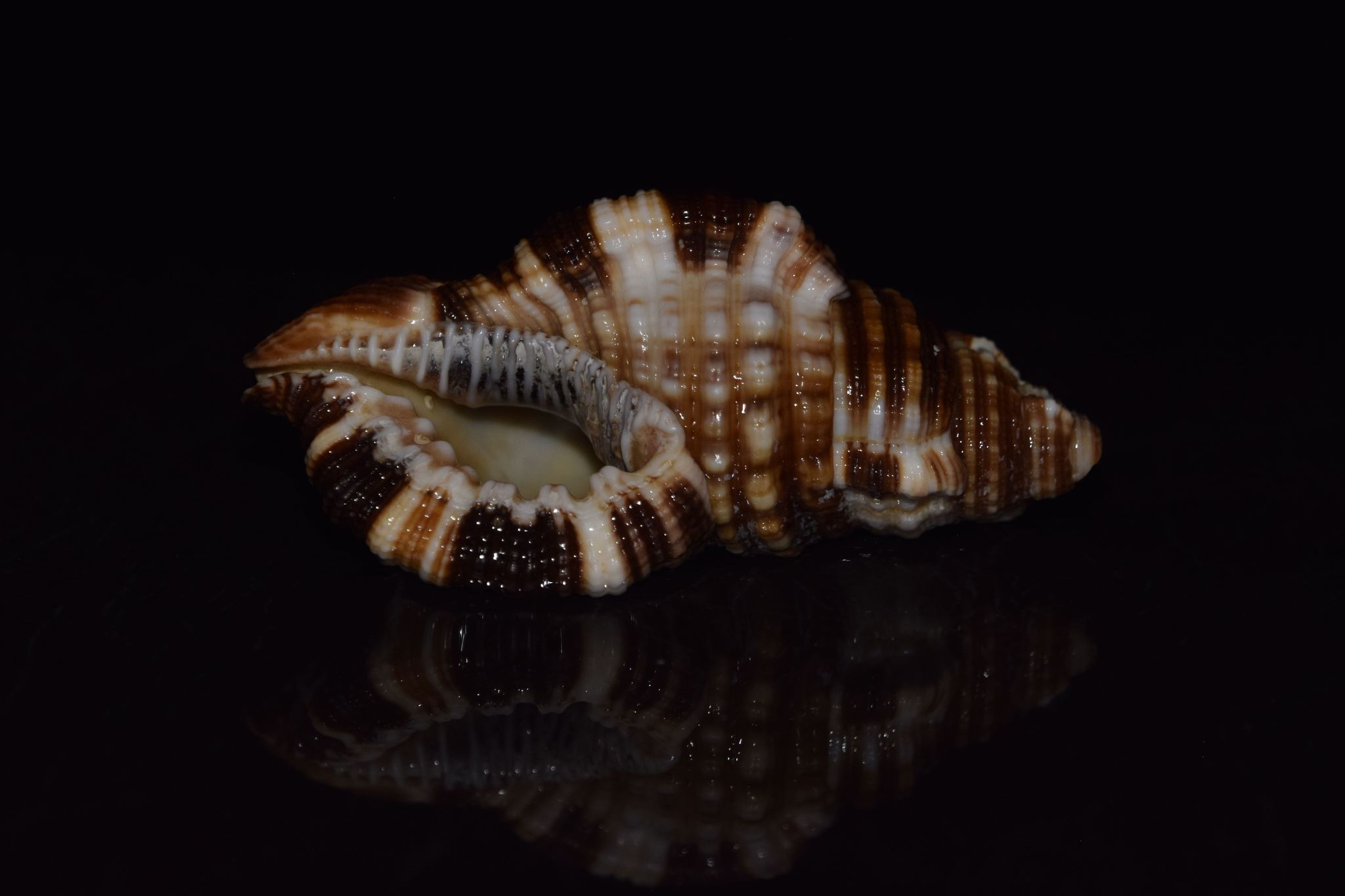

Scientific classification
- Kingdom: Animalia
- Phylum: Mollusca
- Class: Gastropoda
- Subclass: Caenogastropoda
- Order: Littorinimorpha
- Family: Cymatiidae
- Genus: Monoplex
- Species: M. intermedius

Binomial name
- Monoplex intermedius (Pease, 1869)

Synonyms
- Lampusia kikaiensis Shikama, 1970; Triton intermedius Pease, 1869

= Monoplex intermedius =

Species of gastropod

Monoplex intermedius is a species of predatory sea snail, a marine gastropod mollusk in the family Cymatiidae.
