= Cymatiella eburnea =

Scientific classification
- Kingdom: Animalia
- Phylum: Mollusca
- Class: Gastropoda
- Subclass: Caenogastropoda
- Order: Littorinimorpha
- Family: Cymatiidae
- Genus: Cymatiella
- Species: C. eburnea

Binomial name
- Cymatiella eburnea (Reeve, 1844)

Synonyms
- Cymatiella lesueuri Iredale, 1929; Triton eburnea Reeve, 1844

Species of gastropod

Cymatiella eburnea is a species of predatory sea snail in the family Cymatiidae.
