= Cymatiella pumilio =

Scientific classification
- Kingdom: Animalia
- Phylum: Mollusca
- Class: Gastropoda
- Subclass: Caenogastropoda
- Order: Littorinimorpha
- Family: Cymatiidae
- Genus: Cymatiella
- Species: C. pumilio

Binomial name
- Cymatiella pumilio (Hedley, 1903)

Synonyms
- Lotorium pumilium Hedley, 1903

Species of predatory sea snail

Cymatiella pumilio is a species of predatory sea snail in the family Cymatiidae.
