= Monoplex norai =

Scientific classification
- Kingdom: Animalia
- Phylum: Mollusca
- Class: Gastropoda
- Subclass: Caenogastropoda
- Order: Littorinimorpha
- Family: Cymatiidae
- Genus: Monoplex
- Species: M. norai

Binomial name
- Monoplex norai (Garcia-Talavera & de Vera, 2004)

Synonyms
- Cymatium norai Garcia-Talavera & de Vera, 2004

Species of gastropod

Monoplex norai is a species of predatory sea snail, a marine gastropod mollusk in the family Cymatiidae.
