= Cymatiella ansonae =

Scientific classification
- Kingdom: Animalia
- Phylum: Mollusca
- Class: Gastropoda
- Subclass: Caenogastropoda
- Order: Littorinimorpha
- Family: Cymatiidae
- Genus: Cymatiella
- Species: C. ansonae

Binomial name
- Cymatiella ansonae (Beu, 1988)

Synonyms
- Sassia (Cymatiella) ansonae Beu, 1988

Species of gastropod

Cymatiella ansonae is a species of predatory sea snail in the family Cymatiidae.
