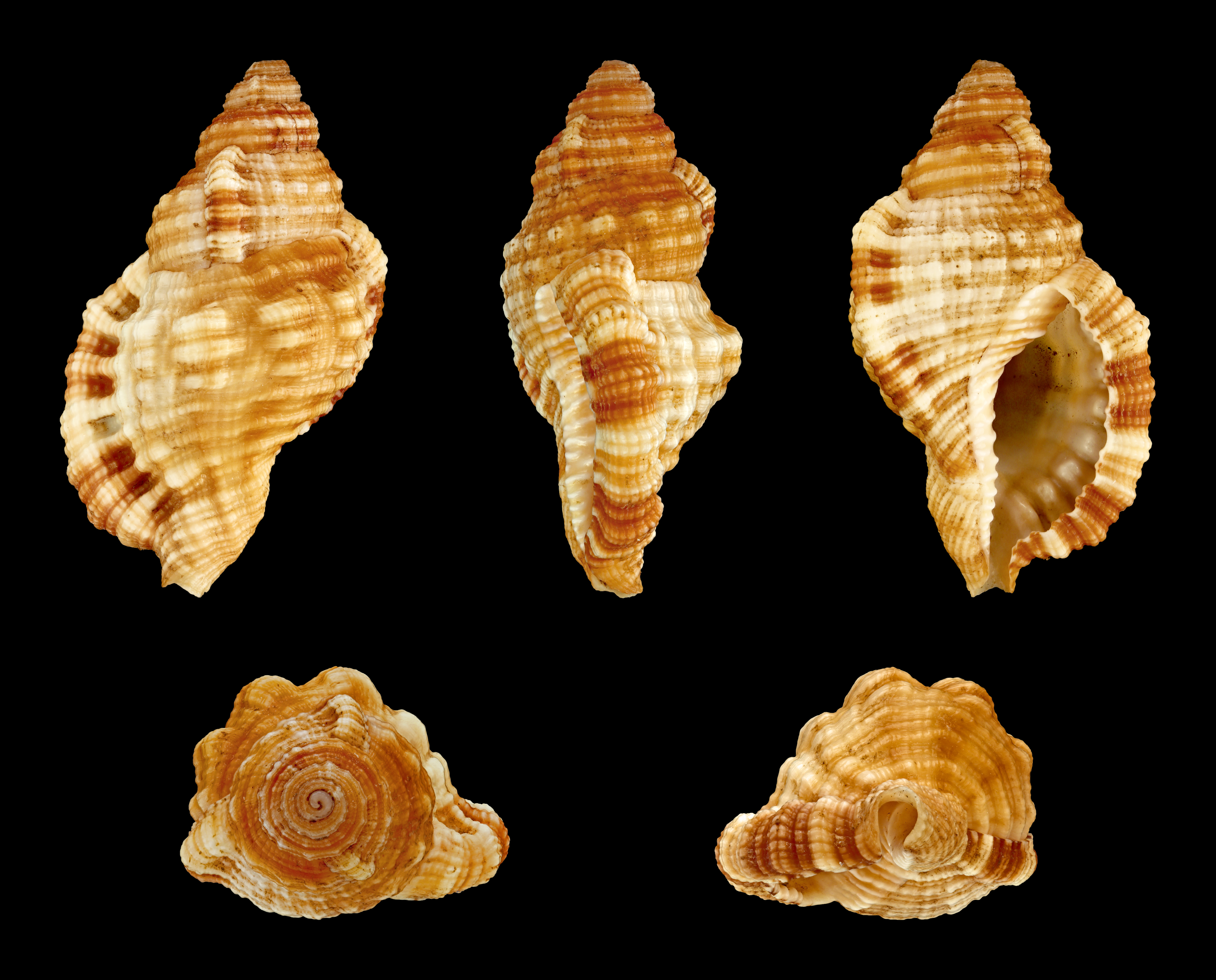

Scientific classification
- Kingdom: Animalia
- Phylum: Mollusca
- Class: Gastropoda
- Subclass: Caenogastropoda
- Order: Littorinimorpha
- Family: Cymatiidae
- Genus: Monoplex
- Species: M. aquatilis

Binomial name
- Monoplex aquatilis (Reeve, 1844)

Synonyms
- Cymatium aquatile (Reeve, 1844); Cymatium cruzana Nowell-Usticke, G.W., 1959; Cymatium pileare var. cruzana Nowell-Usticke, 1959; Lampusia aquatilis (Reeve, 1844); Triton aquatile (Reeve, 1844); Triton aquatile occidentale Mörch, 1877; Triton aquatilis Reeve, 1844

= Monoplex aquatilis =

Species of gastropod

Monoplex aquatilis, the cosmopolitan hairy triton, is a species of predatory sea snail, a marine gastropod mollusk in the family Cymatiidae.

== Distribution ==
This species has a wide distribution across the Atlantic Ocean, European waters, Cape Verde, the Gulf of Mexico, the Caribbean Sea, the Red Sea, the Indian Ocean along the Mascarene Basin and Tanzania and in the Indo-West Pacific Ocean.

== Description ==
The shell size varies between 35 mm and 120 mm.

The maximum recorded shell length is 95 mm.

== Habitat ==
Minimum recorded depth is 0 m. Maximum recorded depth is 18 m.
