= Cymatiella columnaria =

Scientific classification
- Kingdom: Animalia
- Phylum: Mollusca
- Class: Gastropoda
- Subclass: Caenogastropoda
- Order: Littorinimorpha
- Family: Cymatiidae
- Genus: Cymatiella
- Species: C. columnaria

Binomial name
- Cymatiella columnaria (Hedley & May, 1908)

Synonyms
- Cymatium columnarium Hedley & May, 1908

Species of gastropod

Cymatiella columnaria is a species of predatory sea snail in the family Cymatiidae.
