= Cymatiella sexcostata =

Scientific classification
- Kingdom: Animalia
- Phylum: Mollusca
- Class: Gastropoda
- Subclass: Caenogastropoda
- Order: Littorinimorpha
- Family: Cymatiidae
- Genus: Cymatiella
- Species: C. sexcostata

Binomial name
- Cymatiella sexcostata (Tate, 1888)

Synonyms
- Cymatiella gaimardi Iredale, 1929; Triton sexcostata Tate, 1888

Species of gastropod

Cymatiella sexcostata is a species of predatory sea snail in the family Cymatiidae.
