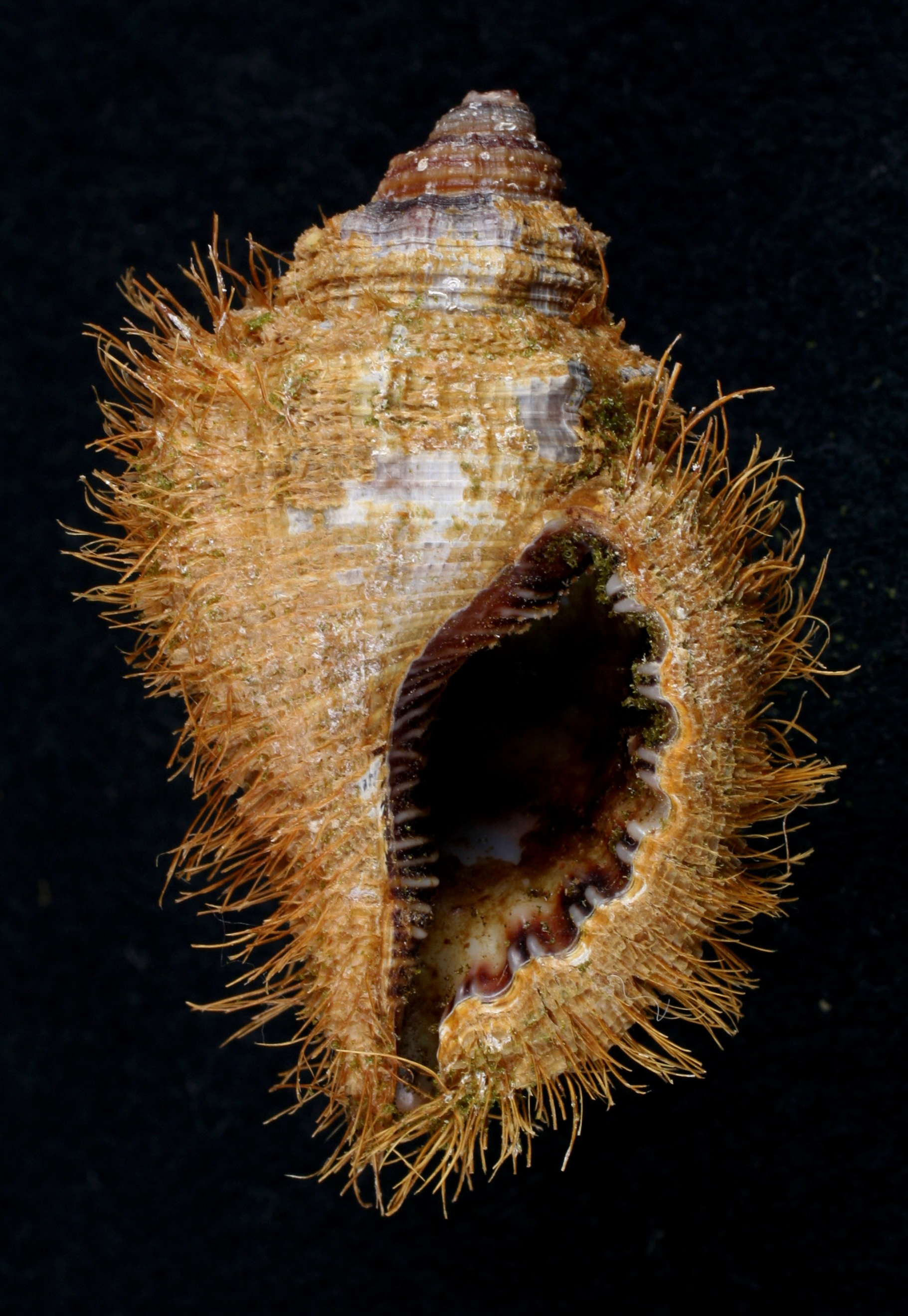
- Apertural view of Monoplex vestitus (Hinds, 1844) with periostracum attached

Scientific classification
- Kingdom: Animalia
- Phylum: Mollusca
- Class: Gastropoda
- Subclass: Caenogastropoda
- Order: Littorinimorpha
- Family: Cymatiidae
- Genus: Monoplex
- Species: M. vestitus

Binomial name
- Monoplex vestitus (Hinds, 1844)

Synonyms
- Cymatium vestitum (Hinds, 1844); Triton vestitus Hinds, 1844; Triton vestitus var. senior C. B. Adams, 1852

= Monoplex vestitus =

Species of gastropod

Monoplex vestitus is a species of predatory sea snail, a marine gastropod mollusk in the family Cymatiidae.
