= Proxicharonia palmeri =

Scientific classification
- Kingdom: Animalia
- Phylum: Mollusca
- Class: Gastropoda
- Subclass: Caenogastropoda
- Order: Littorinimorpha
- Family: Cymatiidae
- Genus: Proxicharonia
- Species: P. palmeri

Binomial name
- Proxicharonia palmeri Powell, 1976

Synonyms
- Sassia palmeri (Powell, 1967)

Species of gastropod

Proxicharonia palmeri is a species of sea snail, a marine gastropod mollusc in the family Cymatiidae.
