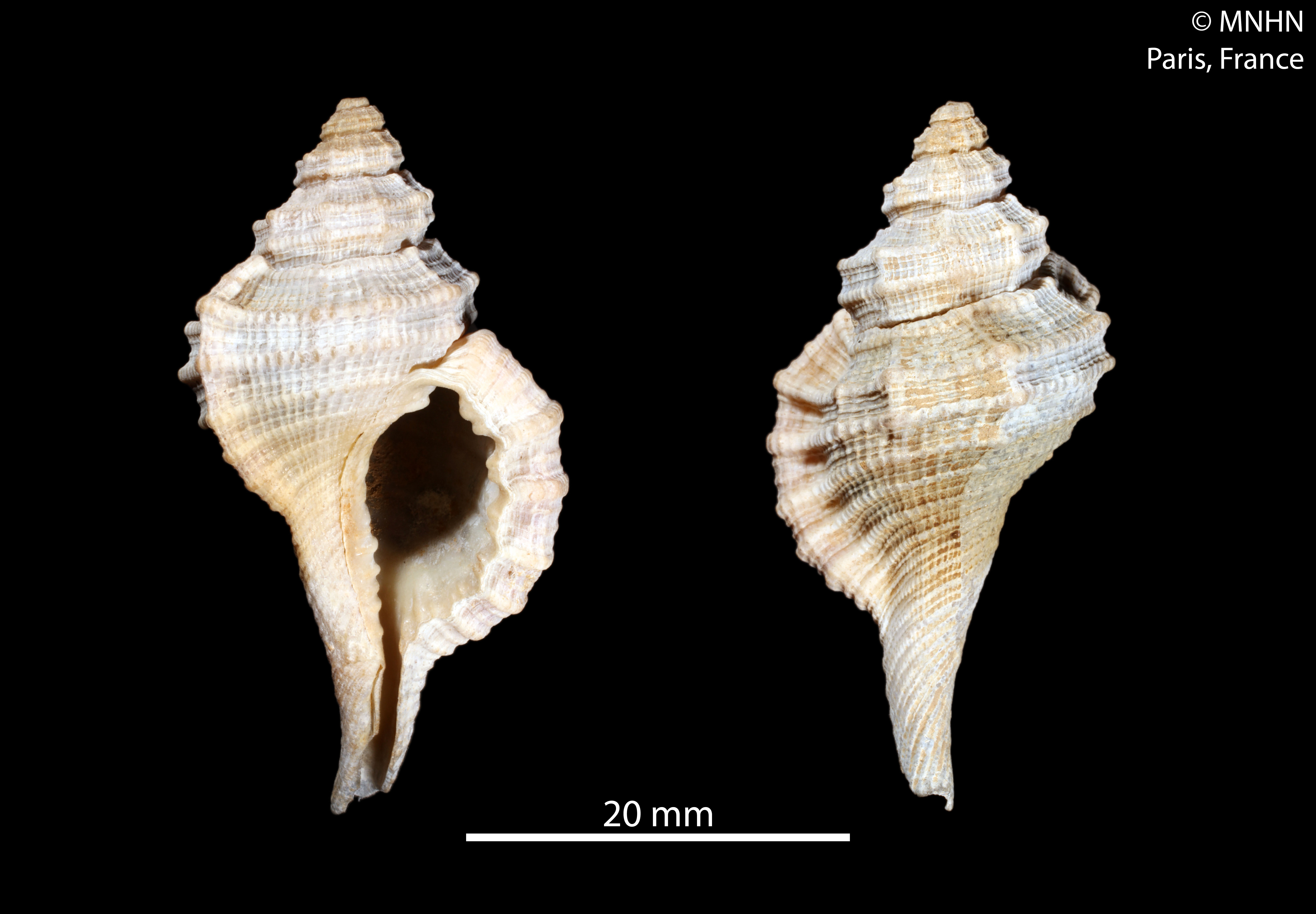
- Shell of Monoplex vespaceus (specimen at MNHN, Paris)

Scientific classification
- Kingdom: Animalia
- Phylum: Mollusca
- Class: Gastropoda
- Subclass: Caenogastropoda
- Order: Littorinimorpha
- Family: Cymatiidae
- Genus: Monoplex
- Species: M. vespaceus

Binomial name
- Monoplex vespaceus (Lamarck, 1822)

Synonyms
- Cymatium (Turritriton) indomelanicum Garcia-Talavera, 1997; Cymatium (Turritriton) vespaceum (J.B.P.A. de Lamarck, 1822); Eutritonium rembangense J. Wanner, & Hahn, 1935; Triton elongatus Reeve, 1844; Triton vespaceus Lamarck, 1822

= Monoplex vespaceus =

Species of gastropod

Monoplex vespaceus, the dwarf hairy triton, is a species of predatory sea snail, a marine gastropod mollusk in the family Cymatiidae.

== Distribution ==
This species has a wide distribution and is found in the Atlantic Ocean (Cape Verde, West Africa, Ghana, Senegal), in the Indian Ocean (Tanzania and Mauritius), in the Indo-West Pacific (New Caledonia), in the Red Sea, in the Gulf of Mexico and in the Caribbean Sea (Lesser Antilles, Belize, Colombia and Cayman Islands).

== Description ==
The shell size varies between 16 mm and 60 mm.

The maximum recorded shell length is 41 mm.

== Habitat ==
Minimum recorded depth is 4.5 m. Maximum recorded depth is 4.5 m.
