= Monoplex thersites =

Scientific classification
- Kingdom: Animalia
- Phylum: Mollusca
- Class: Gastropoda
- Subclass: Caenogastropoda
- Order: Littorinimorpha
- Family: Cymatiidae
- Genus: Monoplex
- Species: M. thersites

Binomial name
- Monoplex thersites (Reeve, 1844)

Synonyms
- Triton thersites Reeve, 1844

Species of gastropod

Monoplex thersites is a species of predatory sea snail, a marine gastropod mollusk in the family Cymatiidae.
