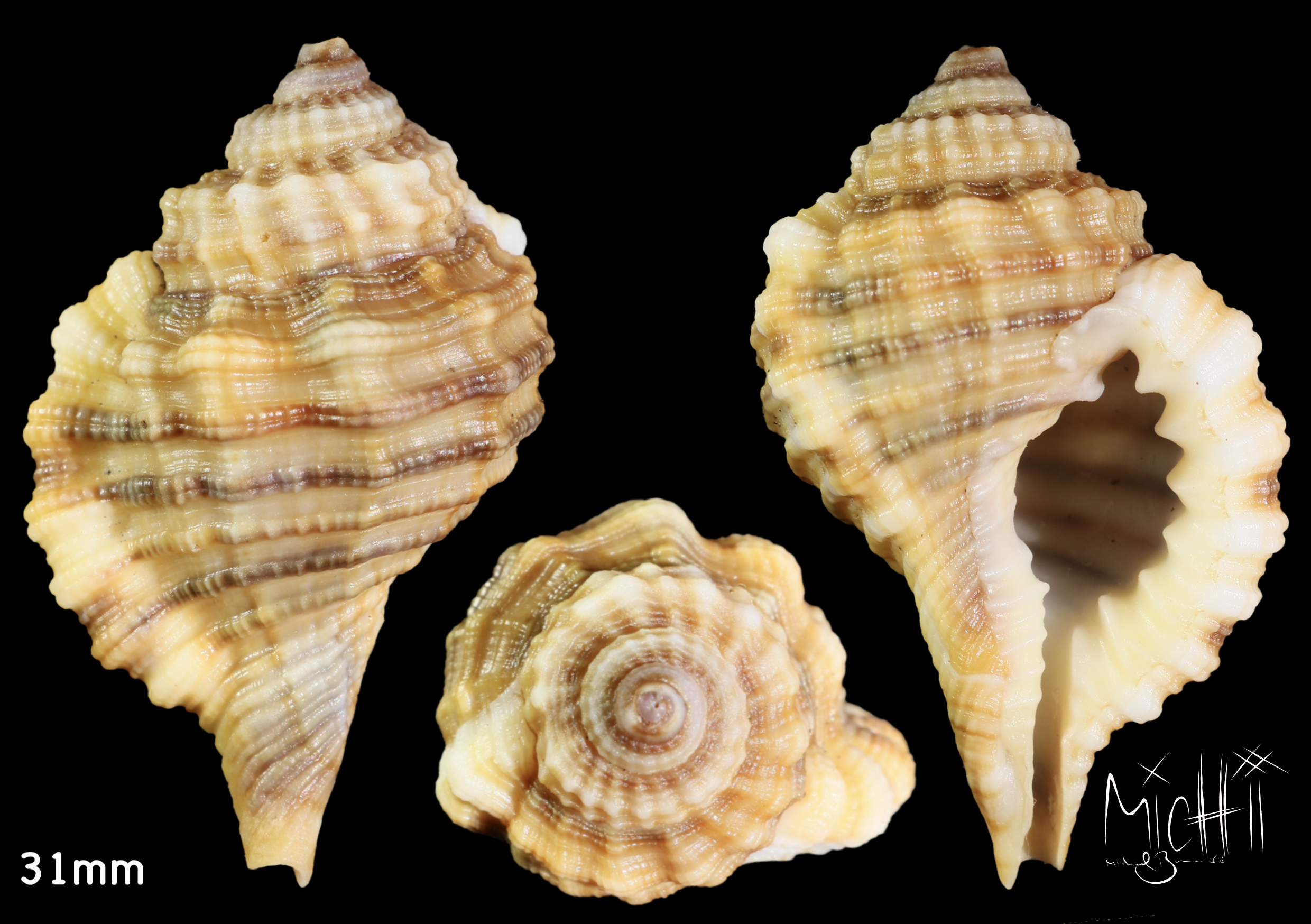

Scientific classification
- Kingdom: Animalia
- Phylum: Mollusca
- Class: Gastropoda
- Subclass: Caenogastropoda
- Order: Littorinimorpha
- Family: Cymatiidae
- Genus: Monoplex
- Species: M. tranquebaricus

Binomial name
- Monoplex tranquebaricus (Lamarck, 1816)

Synonyms
- Cymatium (Linatella) tranquebaricum (Lamarck, 1823); Cymatium (Monoplex) tranquebaricum (Lamarck, J.B.P.A. de, 1816); Cymatium tranquebaricum (Lamarck, 1816); Eutriton (Simpulum) problematicum Dautzenberg & Fischer, 1906; Triton chemnitzii Gray, 1839; Triton tranqueribacus Lamarck, 1816; Tritonium adansonii Dunker, 1853

= Monoplex tranquebaricus =

Species of predatory sea snail

Monoplex tranquebaricus, the West African hairy triton, is a species of predatory sea snail, a marine gastropod mollusk in the family Cymatiidae.

== Description ==
Shell size varies between 21 mm and 80 mm.

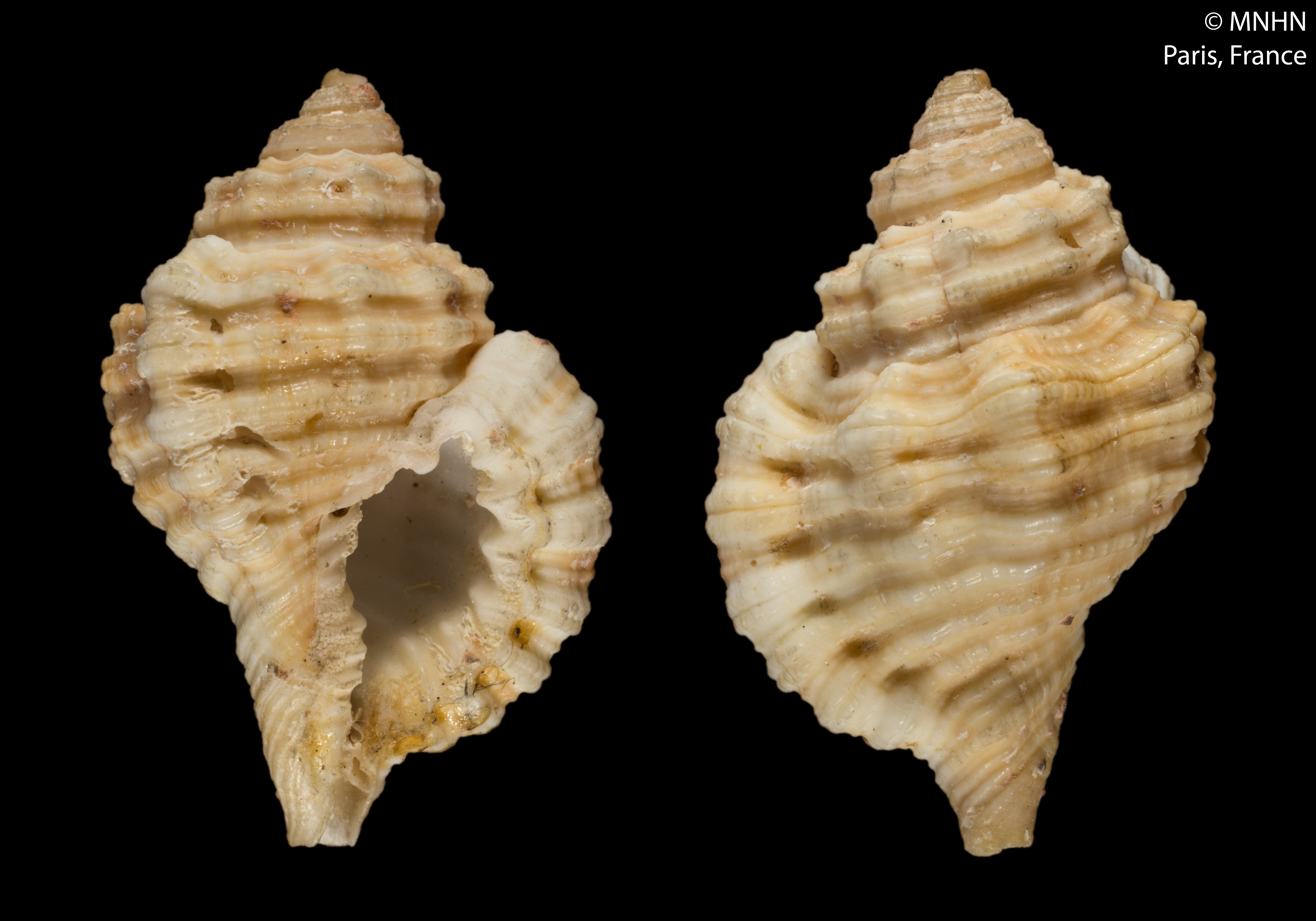
Shell of Monoplex tranquebaricus (syntype at MNHN, Paris).

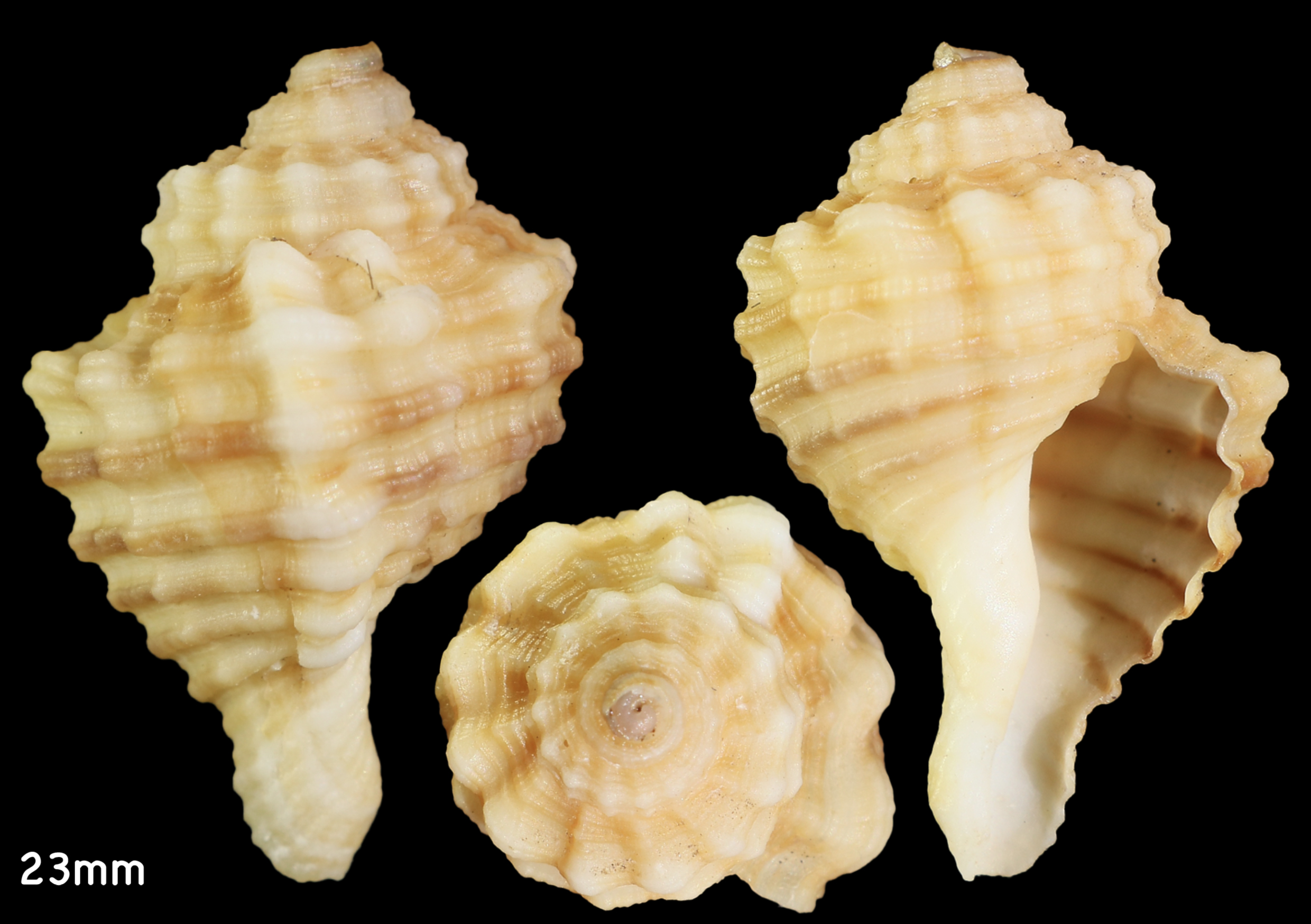
Monoplex tranquebaricus (Lamarck, 1816) 23mm Tenerife, Canary Islands.

== Distribution ==
This species is distributed in European waters, in the Atlantic Ocean along the Canary Islands, Cape Verde, West Africa, Gabon, Angola and in the Caribbean Sea and the Gulf of Mexico and the Florida Keys.
