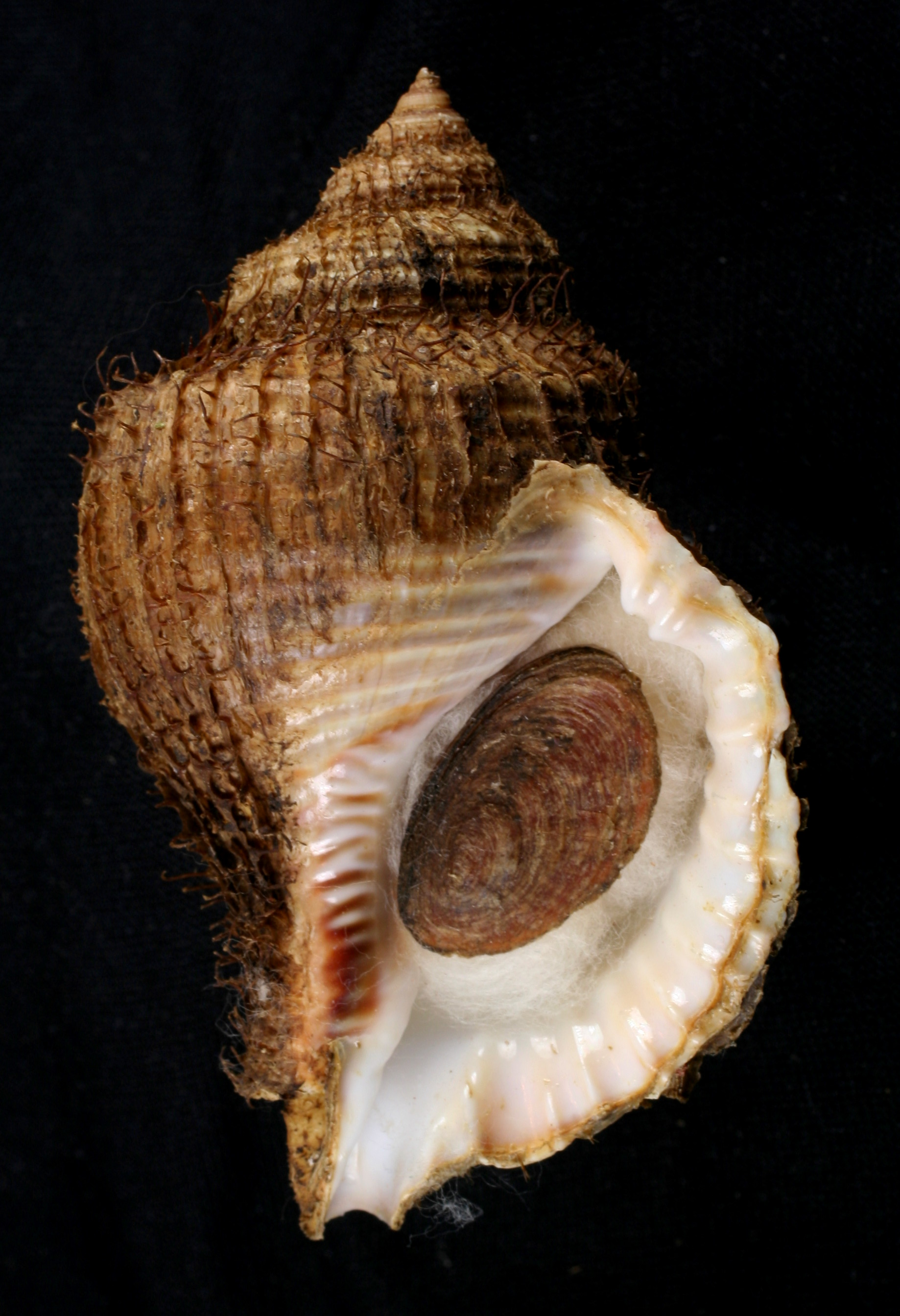
- Apertural view of Monoplex wiegmanni (Anton, 1838) with operculum and periostracum attached

Scientific classification
- Kingdom: Animalia
- Phylum: Mollusca
- Class: Gastropoda
- Subclass: Caenogastropoda
- Order: Littorinimorpha
- Family: Cymatiidae
- Genus: Monoplex
- Species: M. wiegmanni

Binomial name
- Monoplex wiegmanni (Anton, 1838)

Synonyms
- Cymatium (Linatella) cynocephalum Clench & Turner, 1957; Fusus wiegmanni Anton, 1838; Triton chemnitzii Reeve, 1844; Triton perforatus Conrad, 1849; Tritonium nodosum sensu Martini Menke, 1851

= Monoplex wiegmanni =

Species of gastropod

Monoplex wiegmanni is a species of predatory sea snail, a marine gastropod mollusk in the family Cymatiidae.
