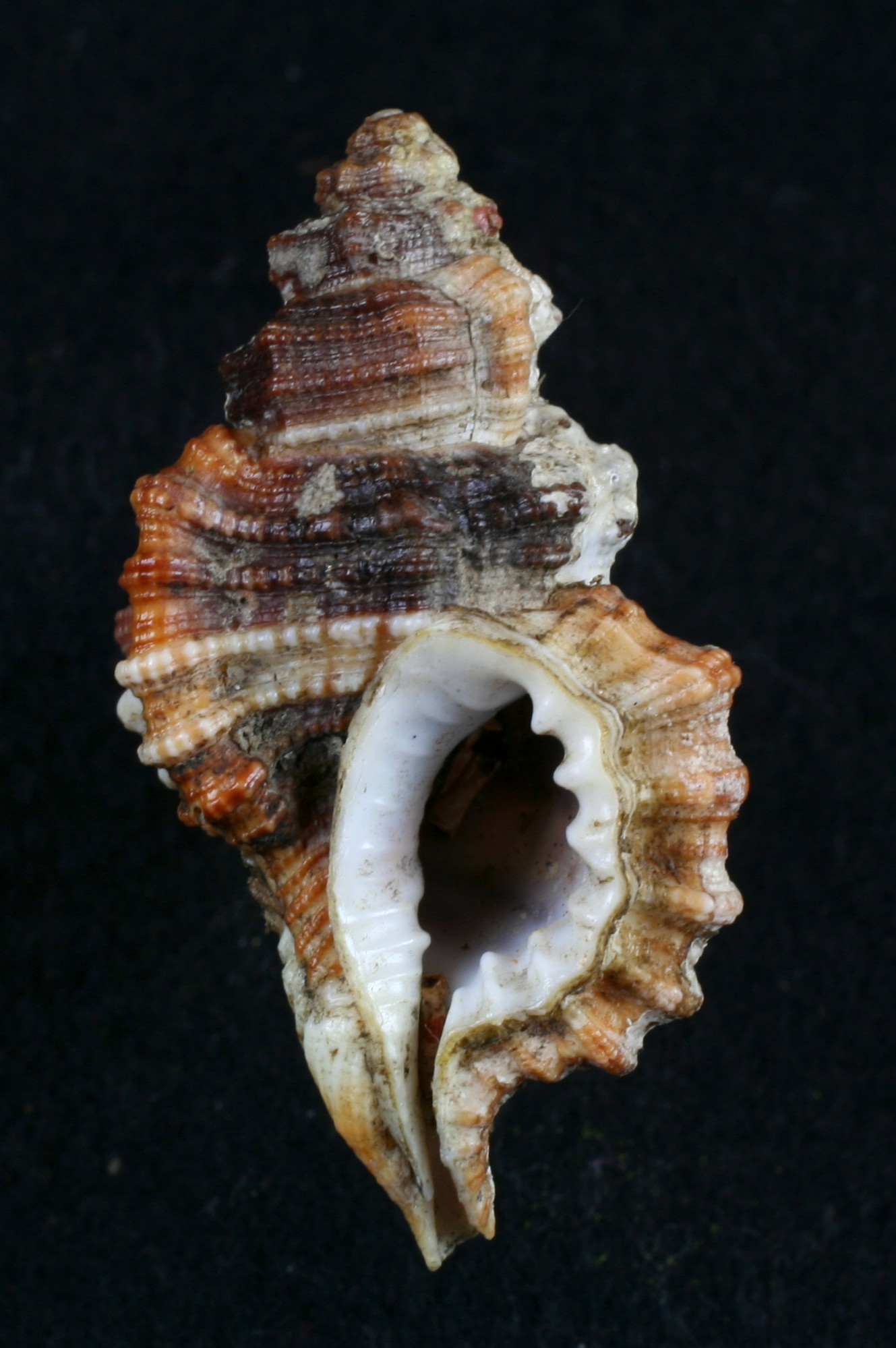
- Apertural view of Monoplex durbanesis (E.A. Smith, 1899)

Scientific classification
- Kingdom: Animalia
- Phylum: Mollusca
- Class: Gastropoda
- Subclass: Caenogastropoda
- Order: Littorinimorpha
- Family: Cymatiidae
- Genus: Monoplex
- Species: M. durbanensis

Binomial name
- Monoplex durbanensis (E.A. Smith, 1899)

Synonyms
- Cymatium durbanensis (E.A. Smith, 1899); Lotorium durbanensis E.A. Smith, 1899

= Monoplex durbanensis =

Species of gastropod

Monoplex durbanensis is a species of predatory sea snail, a marine gastropod mollusk in the family Cymatiidae.
