= Monoplex krebsii =

Scientific classification
- Kingdom: Animalia
- Phylum: Mollusca
- Class: Gastropoda
- Subclass: Caenogastropoda
- Order: Littorinimorpha
- Family: Cymatiidae
- Genus: Monoplex
- Species: M. krebsii

Binomial name
- Monoplex krebsii (Mörch, 1877)

Synonyms
- Cymatium corrugatum krebsii (Mörch, 1877); Cymatium krebsii (Mörch, 1877); Triton (Lampusia) krebsii , 1877

Species of gastropod

Monoplex krebsii is a species of predatory sea snail, a marine gastropod mollusk in the family Cymatiidae.

== Description ==
The maximum recorded shell length is 92 mm.

== Habitat ==
Minimum recorded depth is 2 m. Maximum recorded depth is 146 m.

== Distribution ==
This marine species occurs in the Caribbean Sea, the Gulf of Mexico; off the Lesser Antilles; in the Atlantic Ocean off the Azores.
