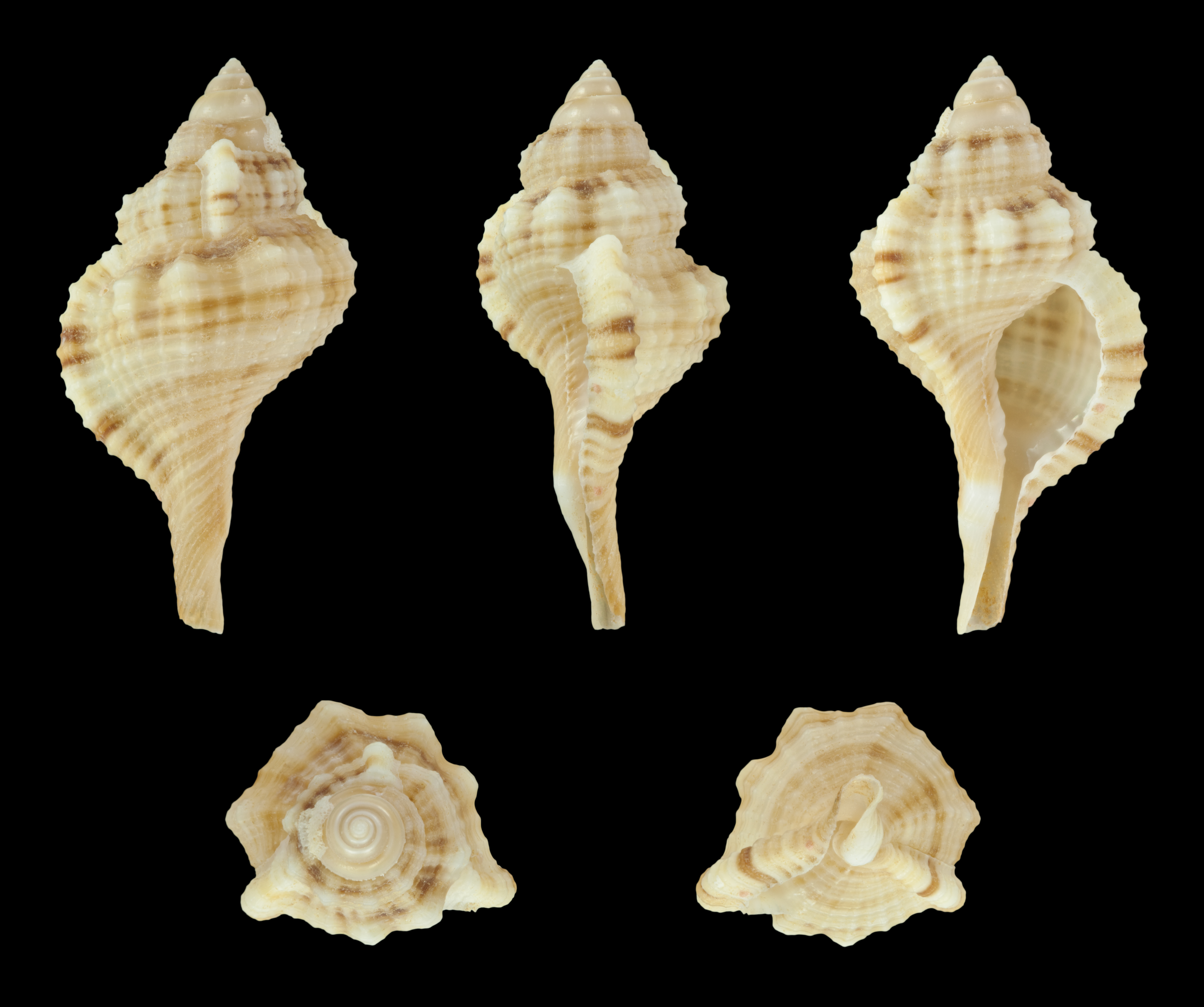

Scientific classification
- Kingdom: Animalia
- Phylum: Mollusca
- Class: Gastropoda
- Subclass: Caenogastropoda
- Order: Littorinimorpha
- Family: Cymatiidae
- Genus: Monoplex
- Species: M. comptus

Binomial name
- Monoplex comptus (A. Adams, 1855)

Synonyms
- Cymatium (Monoplex) comptum (A. Adams, 1855); Cymatium (Monoplex) comptum amphiatlanticum Garcia-Talavera & de Vera, 2003; Cymatium (Septa) gemmatum Clench & Turner, 1957; Lampusia gracilis Dall, 1889; Triton comptus A. Adams, 1855; Triton ridleyi E.A. Smith, 1890

= Monoplex comptus =

Species of gastropod

Monoplex comptus is a species of predatory sea snail, a marine gastropod mollusk in the family Cymatiidae.

== Description ==
The maximum recorded shell length is 34 mm.

== Habitat ==
Minimum recorded depth is 2 m. Maximum recorded depth is 214 m.
