= Monoplex turtoni =

Scientific classification
- Kingdom: Animalia
- Phylum: Mollusca
- Class: Gastropoda
- Subclass: Caenogastropoda
- Order: Littorinimorpha
- Family: Cymatiidae
- Genus: Monoplex
- Species: M. turtoni

Binomial name
- Monoplex turtoni (E.A. Smith, 1890)

Synonyms
- Triton turtoni E.A. Smith, 1890

Species of gastropod

Monoplex turtoni is a species of predatory sea snail, a marine gastropod mollusk in the family Cymatiidae.
