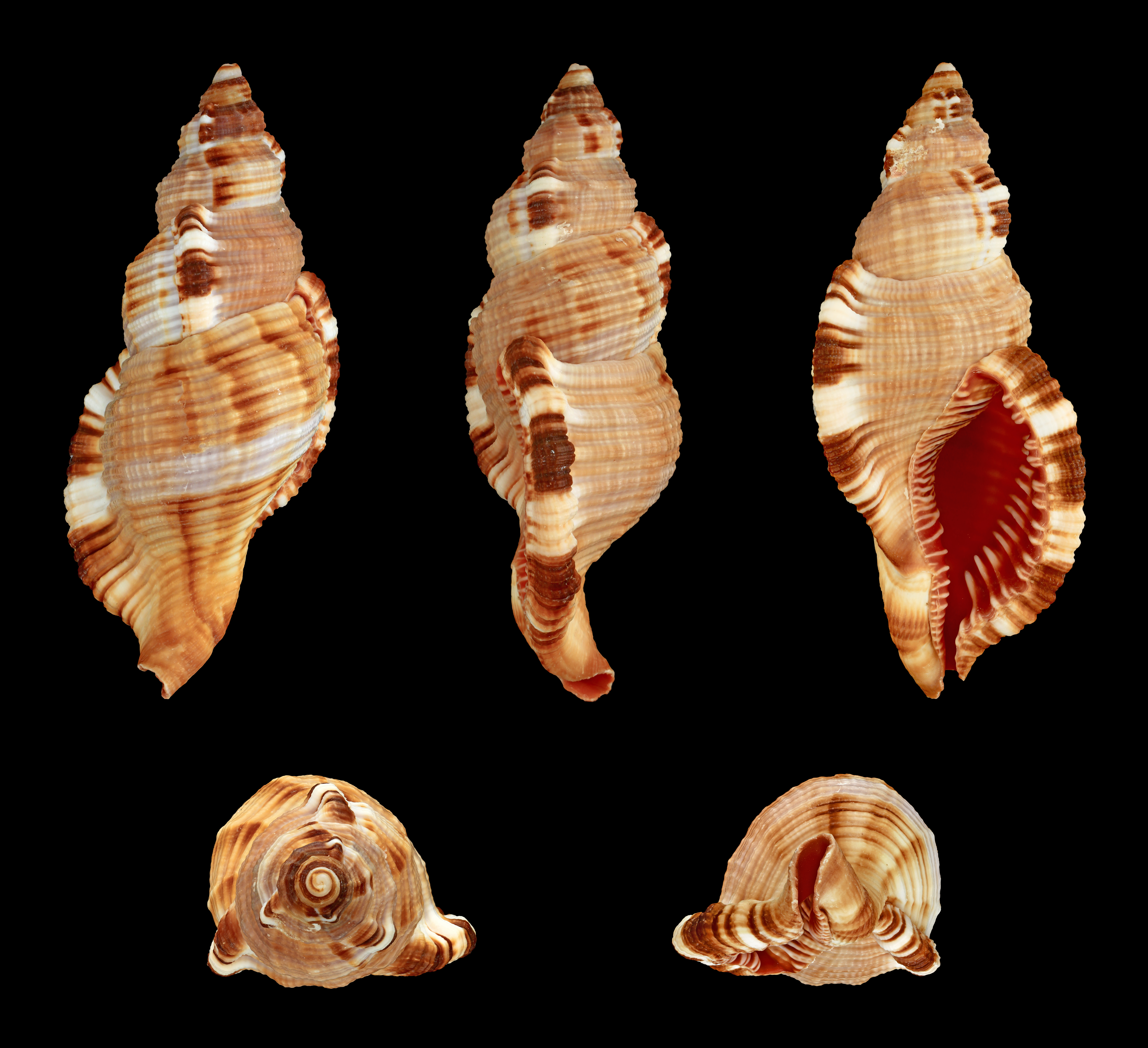
- A shell of Monoplex pilearis (Linnaeus, 1758)

Scientific classification
- Kingdom: Animalia
- Phylum: Mollusca
- Class: Gastropoda
- Subclass: Caenogastropoda
- Order: Littorinimorpha
- Family: Cymatiidae
- Genus: Monoplex
- Species: M. pilearis

Binomial name
- Monoplex pilearis (Linnaeus, 1758)

Synonyms
- Cymatium (Monoplex) pileare orientalis Garcia-Talavera, 1987; Cymatium (Septa) pileare (Linnaeus, 1758); Cymatium (Septa) pileare martinianum (d'Orbigny, 1847); Cymatium martinianum (d'Orbigny, 1847); Cymatium pileare (Linnaeus, 1758); Cymatium vestitum insulare Pilsbry, 1921; Eutritonium pileare (Linnaeus, 1758); Litiopa effusa C. B. Adams, 1850; Monoplex martinianus (d'Orbigny, 1847); Murex pilearis Linnaeus, 1758; Saginafusus pricei perficus Iredale, 1931; Triton haemastoma Valenciennes, 1832; Triton martinianum d'Orbigny, 1842; Triton martinianus d'Orbigny, 1847; Triton veliei Calkins, 1878; Tritonium (Simpulum) beccarii Tapparone-Canefri, 1875; Tritonium olearium Röding, 1798

= Monoplex pilearis =

Species of gastropod

Monoplex pilearis, the hairy triton, is a species of medium-sized predatory sea snail, a marine gastropod mollusk in the family Cymatiidae.

== Distribution ==
This species is widespread in the Atlantic, in the Red Sea and in the Indo-Western Pacific from East and South Africa, to eastern Polynesia, north to southern Japan and Hawaii and south to southern Queensland.

(Monoplex martinianus) This marine species occurs from Florida in the United States to Brazil, Bermudas, Canary Islands, Liberia to Gabon, and Ascension Island.

== Habitat ==
This tropical benthic sea snails can be found at a depth range of 0 – 50 m. They mainly live on hard and coarse detritic bottoms, in coral reef areas.

== Description ==
Shells of Monoplex pilearis can reach a size of 38–140 millimetres (1.5–5.5 in). These large shells are elongate with a tall spire and a strongly inflated body whorl. They show a yellowish-brown surface with chestnut- brown spiral ribs. The columella and the aperture are dark brown with white teeth. The outer sculpture is relatively fine, with long inner ridges of the outer lip, extending deep into the aperture.

== Biology ==
These sea snails are active predators. They are reported as feeding on bivalves. Eggs are laid on the substrate in large capsules clustered in masses.

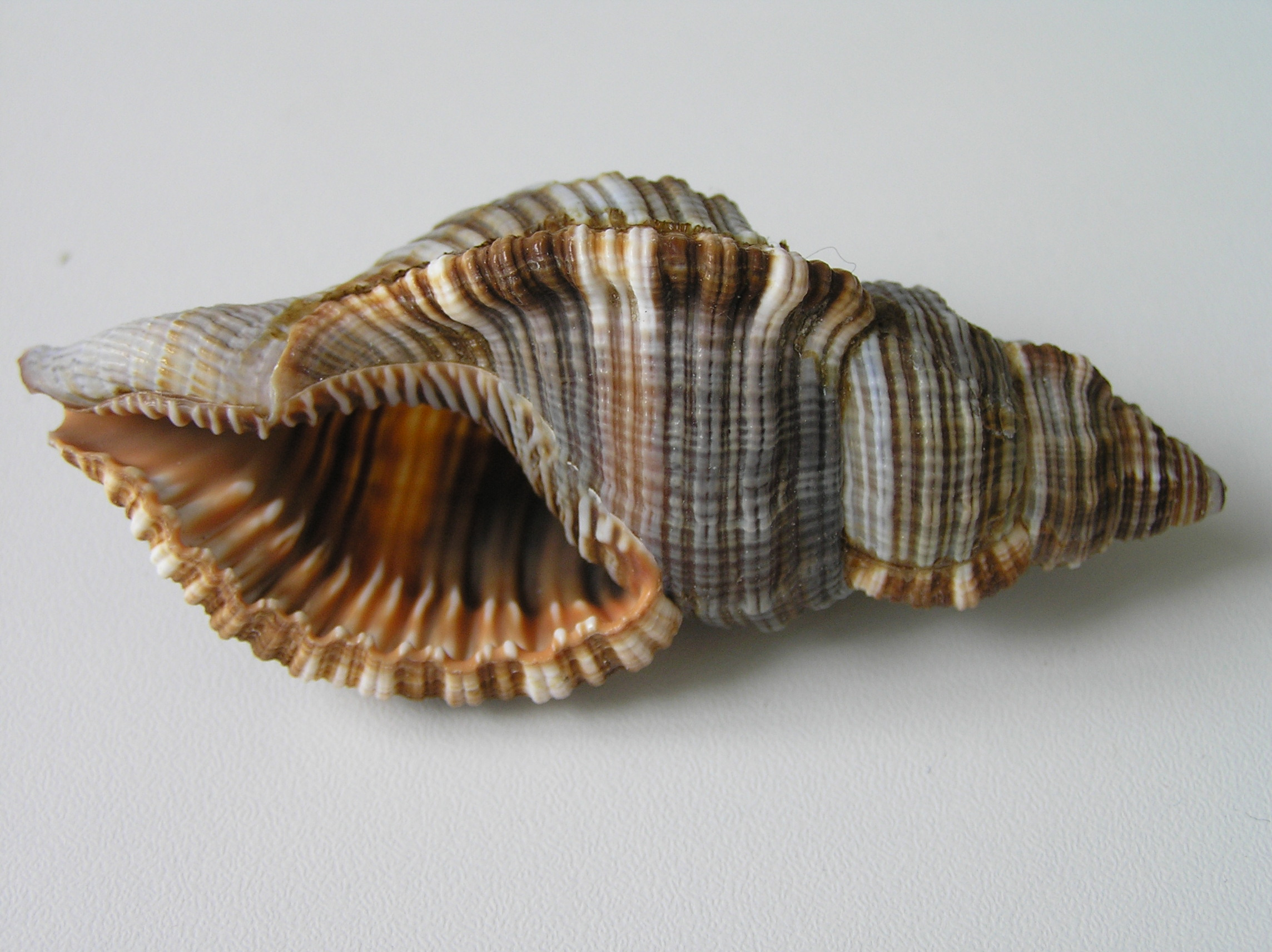
A shell of Monoplex pilearis
