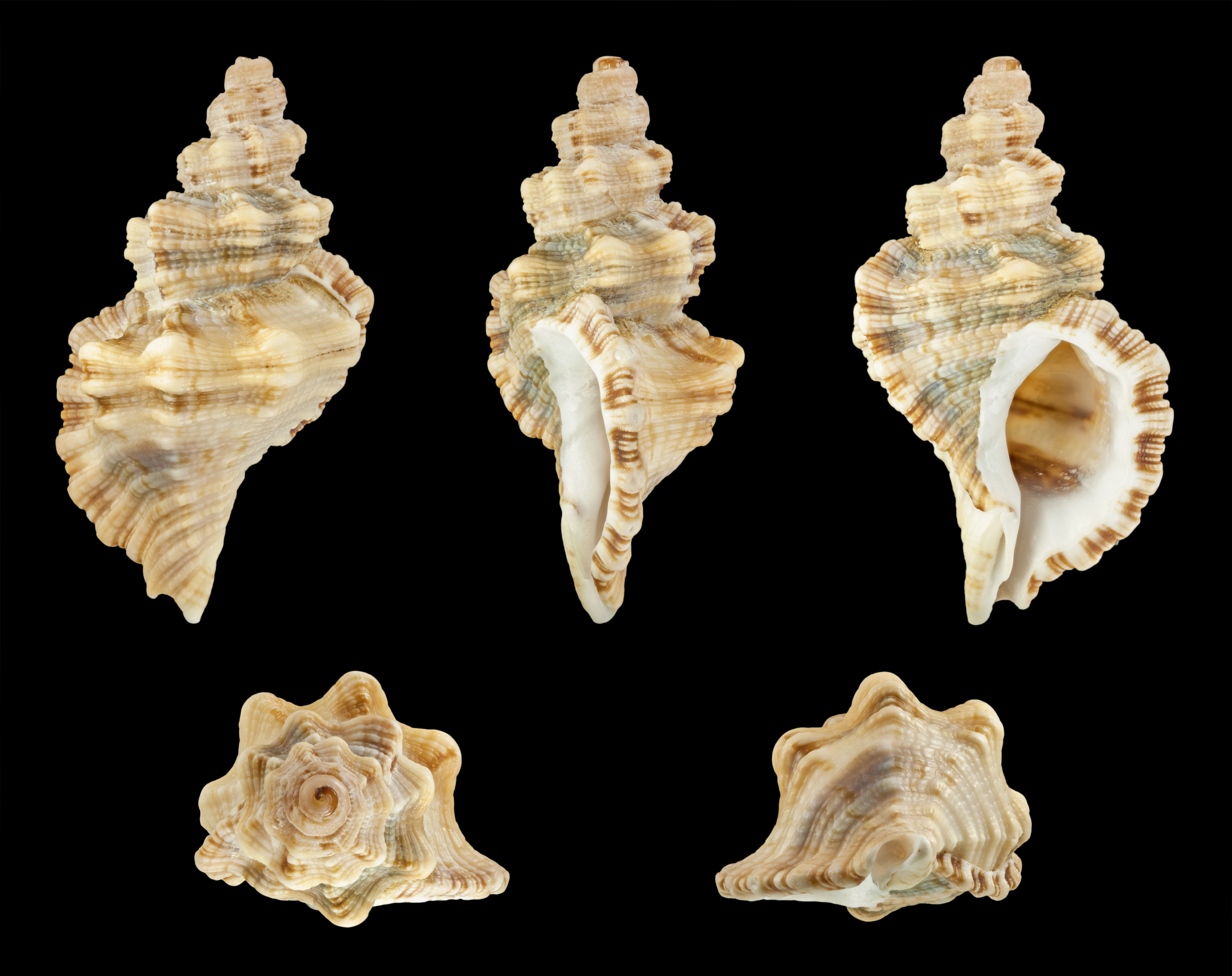

Scientific classification
- Kingdom: Animalia
- Phylum: Mollusca
- Class: Gastropoda
- Subclass: Caenogastropoda
- Order: Littorinimorpha
- Family: Cymatiidae
- Genus: Monoplex
- Species: M. klenei

Binomial name
- Monoplex klenei (G.B. Sowerby III, 1889)

Synonyms
- Cymatium klenei (Sowerby III, 1889); Triton klenei G.B. Sowerby III, 1889

= Monoplex klenei =

Species of gastropod

Monoplex klenei is a species of predatory sea snail, a marine gastropod mollusk in the family Cymatiidae.

== Distribution ==
This species occurs in the Indian Ocean off Mozambique.
