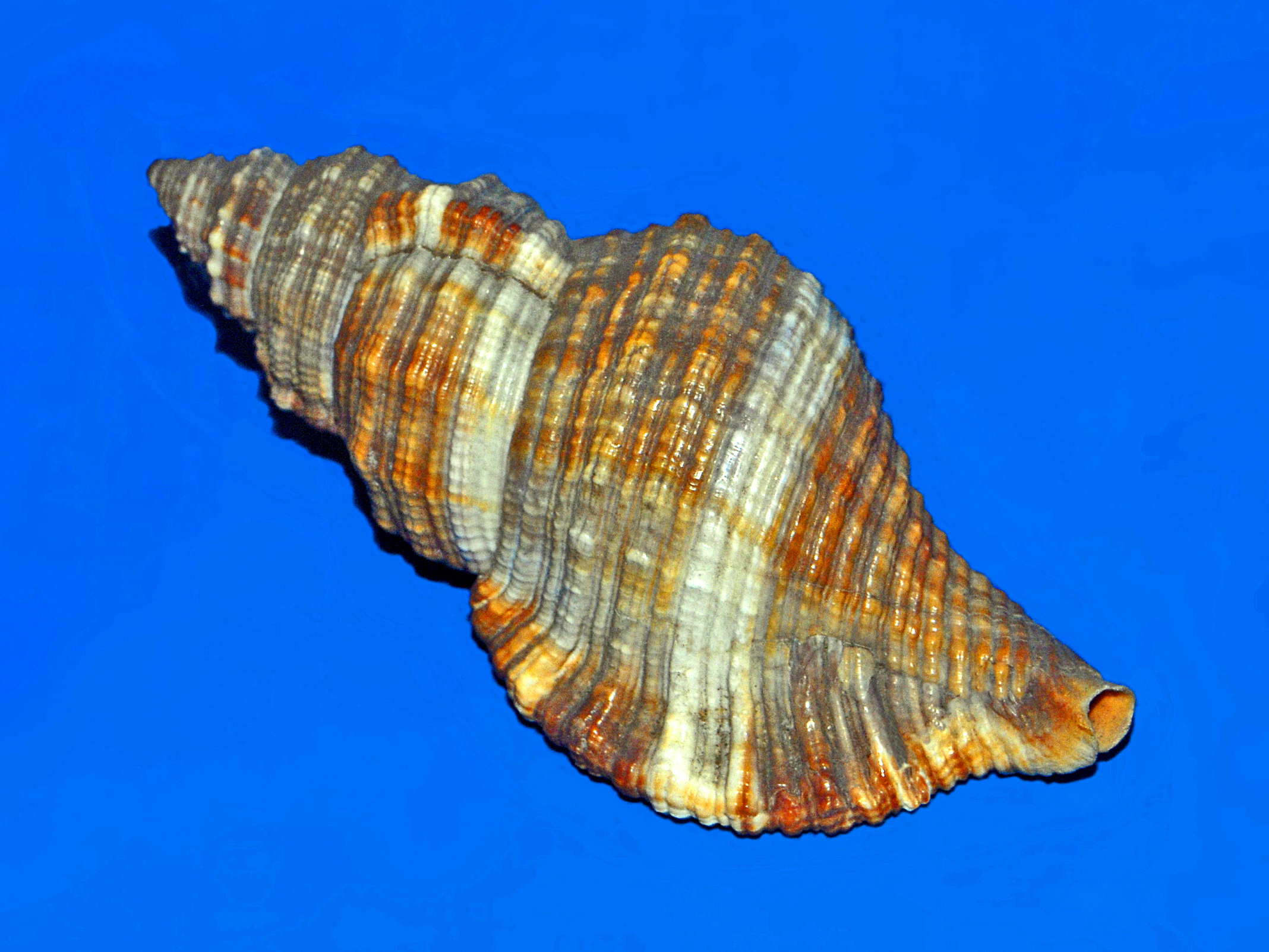
- A shell of Monoplex macrodon

Scientific classification
- Kingdom: Animalia
- Phylum: Mollusca
- Class: Gastropoda
- Subclass: Caenogastropoda
- Order: Littorinimorpha
- Family: Cymatiidae
- Genus: Monoplex
- Species: M. macrodon

Binomial name
- Monoplex macrodon (Valenciennes, 1832)

Synonyms
- Cymatium (Monoplex) pileare Dall, 1909; Cymatium pileare (Dall 1909); Triton macrodon Valenciennes, 1832

= Monoplex macrodon =

Species of gastropod

Monoplex macrodon is a species of predatory sea snail, a marine gastropod mollusk in the family Cymatiidae.

== Distribution ==
This species is present in Baja California, Mexico – Colombia, in Galápagos, Clipperton Island and Cocos Island.

== Description ==
Shells of Monoplex macrodon can reach a size of 35–90 millimetres (1.4–3.5 in).

== Bibliography ==
- The Recent Molluscan Marine Fauna of the Islas Galápagos, p 32
- Ranellidae & Personidae of the World, Pl. 14/3
- Bull. Am. Mus. Nat. Hist., Vol. 262, p 122
- Valenciennes A. (1832). Coquilles univalves marines de l'Amérique équinoxiale, recueillies pendant le voyage de MM. A. de Humboldt et A. Bonpland. pp. 262–339, pl. 57. In: A. von Humboldt & A. Bonpland (eds), Observations de zoologie et d'anatomie comparée
- Beu A.G. 2010 [August]. Neogene tonnoidean gastropods of tropical and South America: contributions to the Dominican Republic and Panama Paleontology Projects and uplift of the Central American Isthmus. Bulletins of American Paleontology 377-378: 550 pp, 79 pls.
