= Monoplex amictus =

Scientific classification
- Kingdom: Animalia
- Phylum: Mollusca
- Class: Gastropoda
- Subclass: Caenogastropoda
- Order: Littorinimorpha
- Family: Cymatiidae
- Genus: Monoplex
- Species: M. amictus

Binomial name
- Monoplex amictus (Reeve, 1844)

Synonyms
- Cymatium (Gutturnium) amictoideum Keen, 1971; Cymatium corrugatum var. tremperi Dall, 1907; Triton amictus Reeve, 1844

Species of gastropod

Monoplex amictus is a species of predatory sea snail, a marine gastropod mollusk in the family Cymatiidae.
