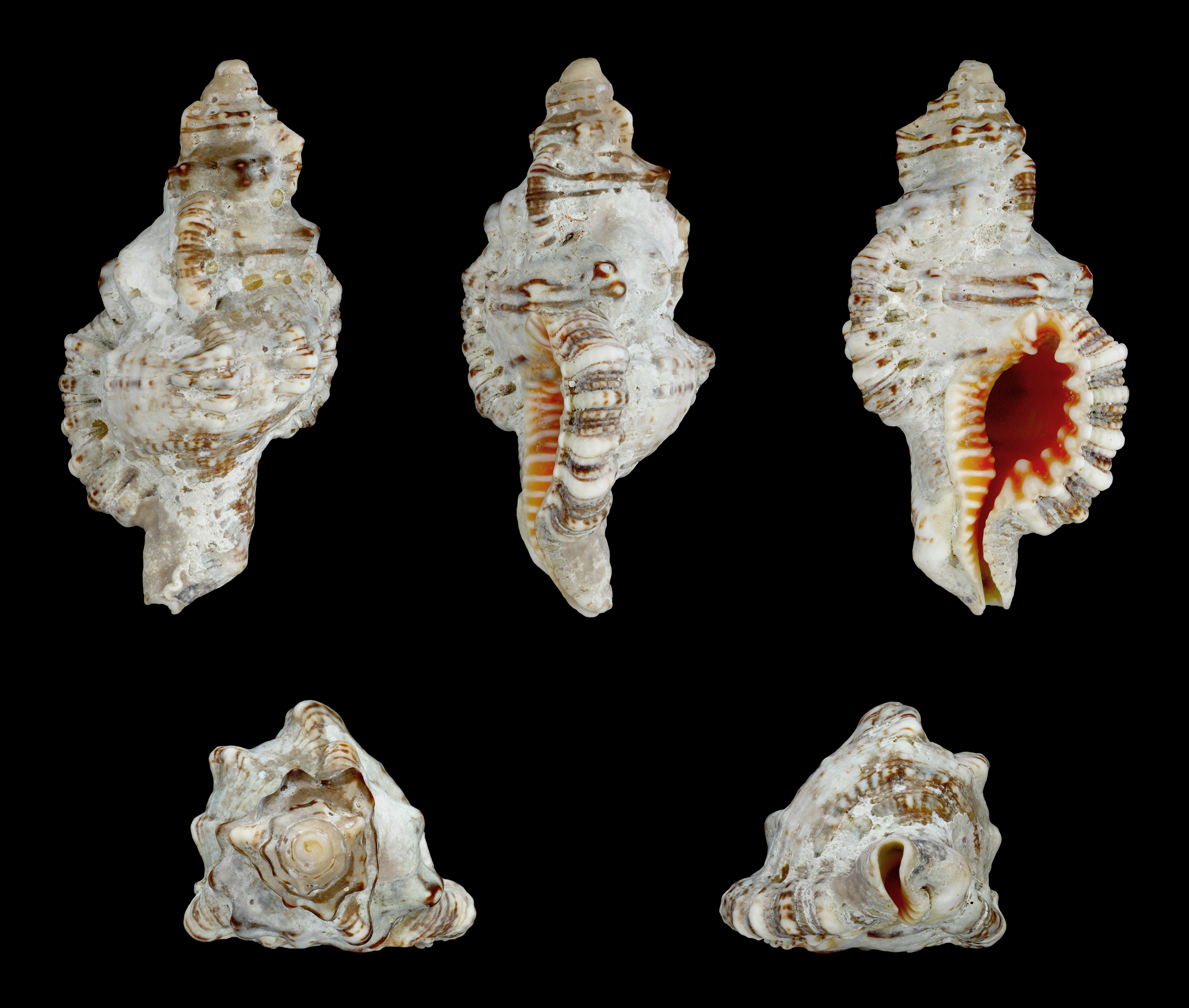
- Five views of a shell of Monoplex nicobaricus, the gold-mouthed triton

Scientific classification
- Kingdom: Animalia
- Phylum: Mollusca
- Class: Gastropoda
- Subclass: Caenogastropoda
- Order: Littorinimorpha
- Superfamily: Tonnoidea
- Family: Cymatiidae
- Genus: Monoplex; Perry, 1811

Type species
- Monoplex australasiae Perry, 1811

Synonyms
- Cabestanimorpha Iredale, 1936; Cymatium (Cymatriton) Clench & R. D. Turner, 1957; Cymatium (Monoplex) Perry, 1810; Cymatriton Clench & Turner, 1957; Dissentoma Pilsbry, 1945; Lampusia Schumacher, 1817; Septa (Monoplex) Perry, 1810; Triton (Lampusia) Schumacher, 1817; Triton (Monoplex) Perry, 1810; Tritonium (Lampusia) Schumacher, 1817

= Monoplex =

Genus of gastropods

Monoplex is a genus of predatory sea snails, marine gastropod mollusks in the family Cymatiidae.

== Species ==
Species within the genus Monoplex include:

- Monoplex amictus (Reeve, 1844)
- Monoplex aquatilis (Reeve, 1844)
- † Monoplex cecilianus (Dall, 1916)
- † Monoplex cercadicus (Maury, 1917)
- Monoplex comptus (A. Adams, 1855)
- Monoplex corrugatus (Lamarck, 1816)
- † Monoplex dissimilis Landau, Beu, Breitenberger & Dekkers, 2020
- † Monoplex distortus (Brocchi, 1814)
- † Monoplex doderleini (D'Ancona, 1873)
- Monoplex durbanensis (E.A. Smith, 1899)
- Monoplex exaratus (Reeve, 1844)
- † Monoplex gatunicus Beu, 2010
- Monoplex gemmatus (Reeve, 1844)
- † Monoplex gradatus Craig, Tracey & Gain, 2020
- † Monoplex gurabonicus (Maury, 1917)
- † Monoplex heptagonus (Brocchi, 1814)
- Monoplex intermedius (Pease, 1869)
- † Monoplex jackwinorum Beu, 2010
- Monoplex keenae Beu, 1970
- Monoplex klenei (G.B. Sowerby III, 1889)
- Monoplex krebsii (Mörch, 1877)
- Monoplex lignarius (Broderip, 1833)
- † Monoplex longispira Beu, 2010
- Monoplex macrodon (Valenciennes, 1832)
- Monoplex mundus (Gould, 1849)
- Monoplex nicobaricus (Röding, 1798)
- Monoplex norai (Garcia-Talavera & de Vera, 2004)
- † Monoplex panamensis Beu, 2010
- Monoplex parthenopeus (Salis Marschlins, 1793)
- Monoplex penniketi (Beu, 1998)
- Monoplex pilearis (Linnaeus, 1758)
- † Monoplex rembangensis (Wanner & Hahn, 1935)
- † Monoplex ritteri Schmelz, 1989
- † Monoplex subcorrugatus (d'Orbigny, 1852)
- Monoplex thersites (Reeve, 1844)
- Monoplex tranquebaricus (Lamarck, 1816)
- Monoplex trigonus (Gmelin, 1791)
- Monoplex turtoni (E.A. Smith, 1890)
- Monoplex vespaceus (Lamarck, 1822)
- Monoplex vestitus (Hinds, 1844)
- Monoplex wiegmanni (Anton, 1838)

Species brought into synonymy

- Monoplex australasiae Perry, 1811: synonym of Monoplex parthenopeus (Salis Marschlins, 1793)
- Monoplex capitatus Perry, 1811: synonym of Tudicla spirillus (Linnaeus, 1767)
- Monoplex cornutus Perry, 1811: synonym of Monoplex exaratus (Reeve, 1844)
- Monoplex formosus Perry, 1811: synonym of Ranularia gutturnia (Röding, 1798)
- Monoplex martinianus (d'Orbigny, 1847): synonym of Monoplex pilearis (Linnaeus, 1758)
- Monoplex oboesa Perry, 1811: synonym of Ranularia oboesa (Perry, 1811)
