= Proxicharonia =

Scientific classification
- Kingdom: Animalia
- Phylum: Mollusca
- Class: Gastropoda
- Subclass: Caenogastropoda
- Order: Littorinimorpha
- Family: Cymatiidae
- Genus: Proxicharonia; Powell, 1938

Genus of gastropods

Proxicharonia is a genus of sea snails, marine gastropod molluscs in the family Cymatiidae.

== Species ==
The only species within the genus Proxicharonia is:

- Proxicharonia palmeri Powell, 1967
