= Distorsomina =

Scientific classification
- Kingdom: Animalia
- Phylum: Mollusca
- Class: Gastropoda
- Subclass: Caenogastropoda
- Order: Littorinimorpha
- Family: Cymatiidae
- Genus: Distorsomina; Beu, 1998

Species
- Distorsomina pusilla (Pease, 1861)

Genus of gastropods

Distorsomina is a genus of medium-sized sea snails, marine gastropod mollusks in the family Cymatiidae. The only species within the genus Distorsomina is Distorsomina pusilla.
