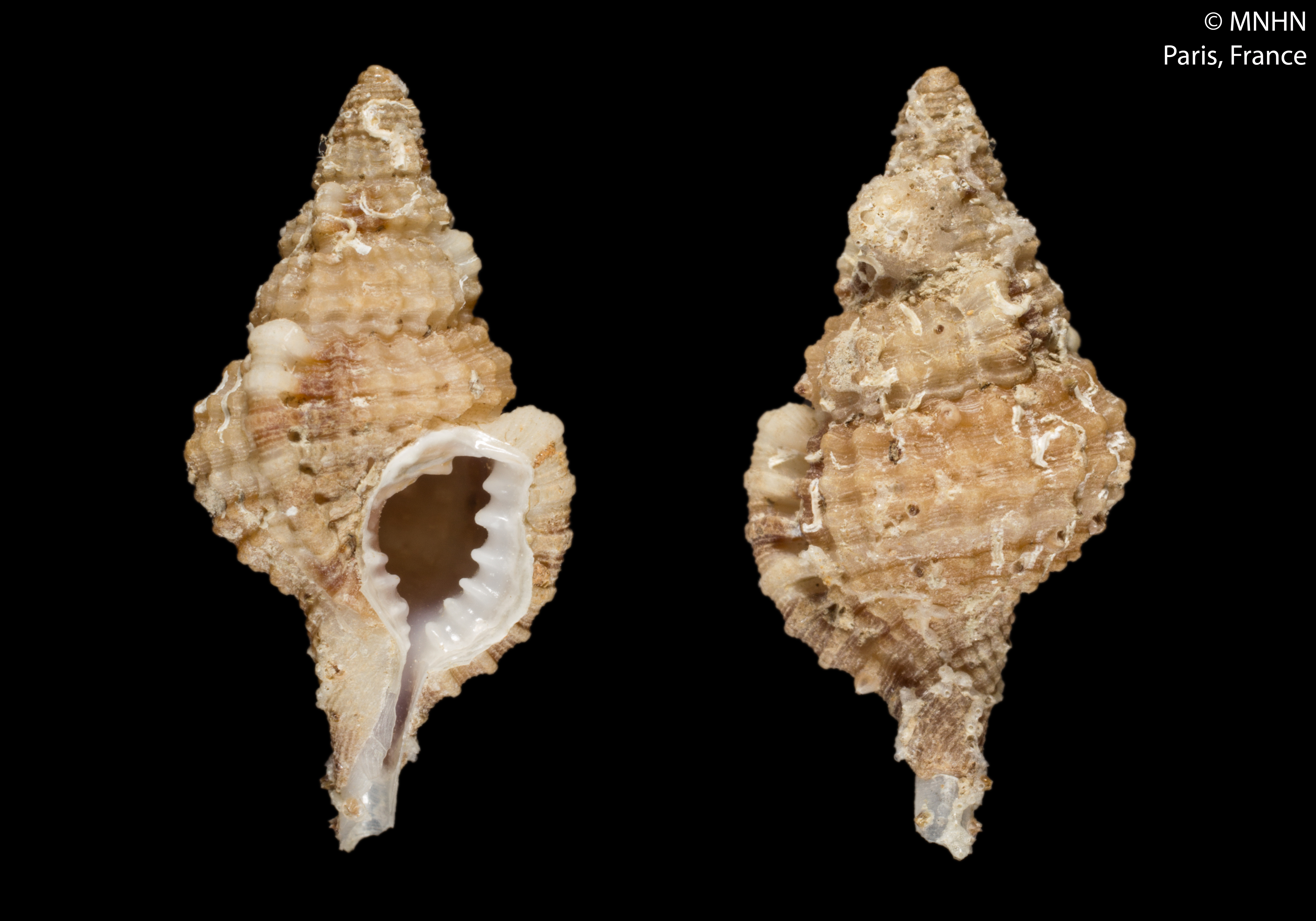
- Shell of Personella lewisi (specimen at MNHN, Paris)

Scientific classification
- Kingdom: Animalia
- Phylum: Mollusca
- Class: Gastropoda
- Subclass: Caenogastropoda
- Order: Littorinimorpha
- Family: Cymatiidae
- Genus: Personella; Conrad, 1865

Species
- Personella lewisi (Harasewych & Petuch, 1980)

Synonyms
- † Distorsio (Personella) Conrad, 1865; † Sassia lewisi Harasewych & Petuch, 1980

= Personella =

Genus of gastropods

Personella is a genus of predatory sea snail, a marine gastropod mollusk in the family Cymatiidae. Its only species is Personella lewisi.

== Distribution ==
This marine species occurs off Guadeloupe.

== Description ==
The maximum recorded shell length is 27.9 mm.

== Habitat ==
Minimum recorded depth is 80 m. Maximum recorded depth is 140 m.
