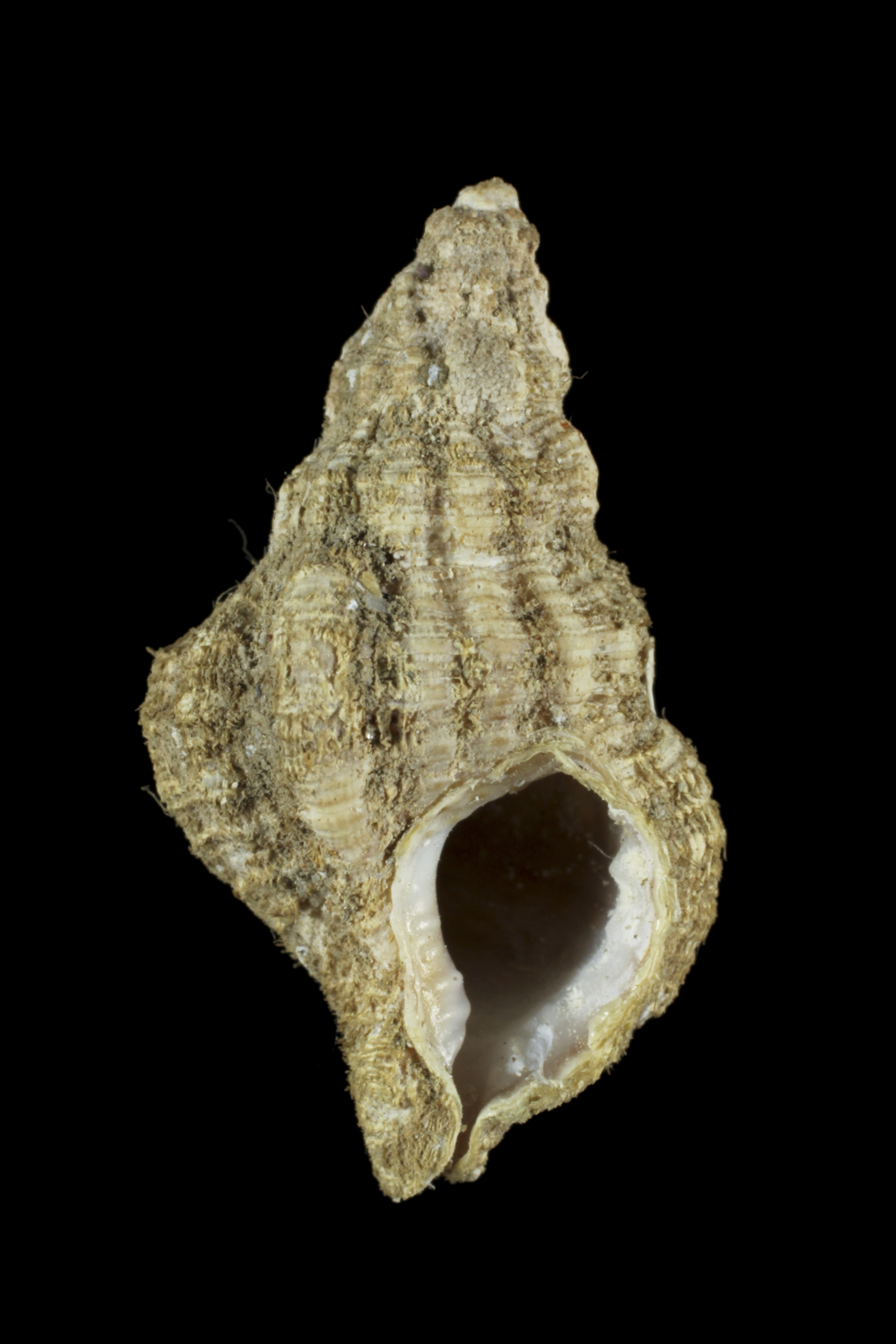

Scientific classification
- Kingdom: Animalia
- Phylum: Mollusca
- Class: Gastropoda
- Subclass: Caenogastropoda
- Order: Littorinimorpha
- Family: Cymatiidae
- Genus: Cymatiella; Iredale, 1924

Synonyms
- Vernotriton Iredale, 1936

= Cymatiella =

Genus of gastropods

Cymatiella is a genus of predatory sea snails, marine gastropod mollusks in the family Cymatiidae.

== Species ==
Species within the genus Cymatiella include:

- Cymatiella ansonae (Beu, 1988)
- Cymatiella columnaria (Hedley & May, 1908)
- Cymatiella eburnea (Reeve, 1844)
- Cymatiella pumilio (Hedley, 1903)
- Cymatiella sexcostata (Tate, 1888)
- Cymatiella verrucosa (Reeve, 1844)
