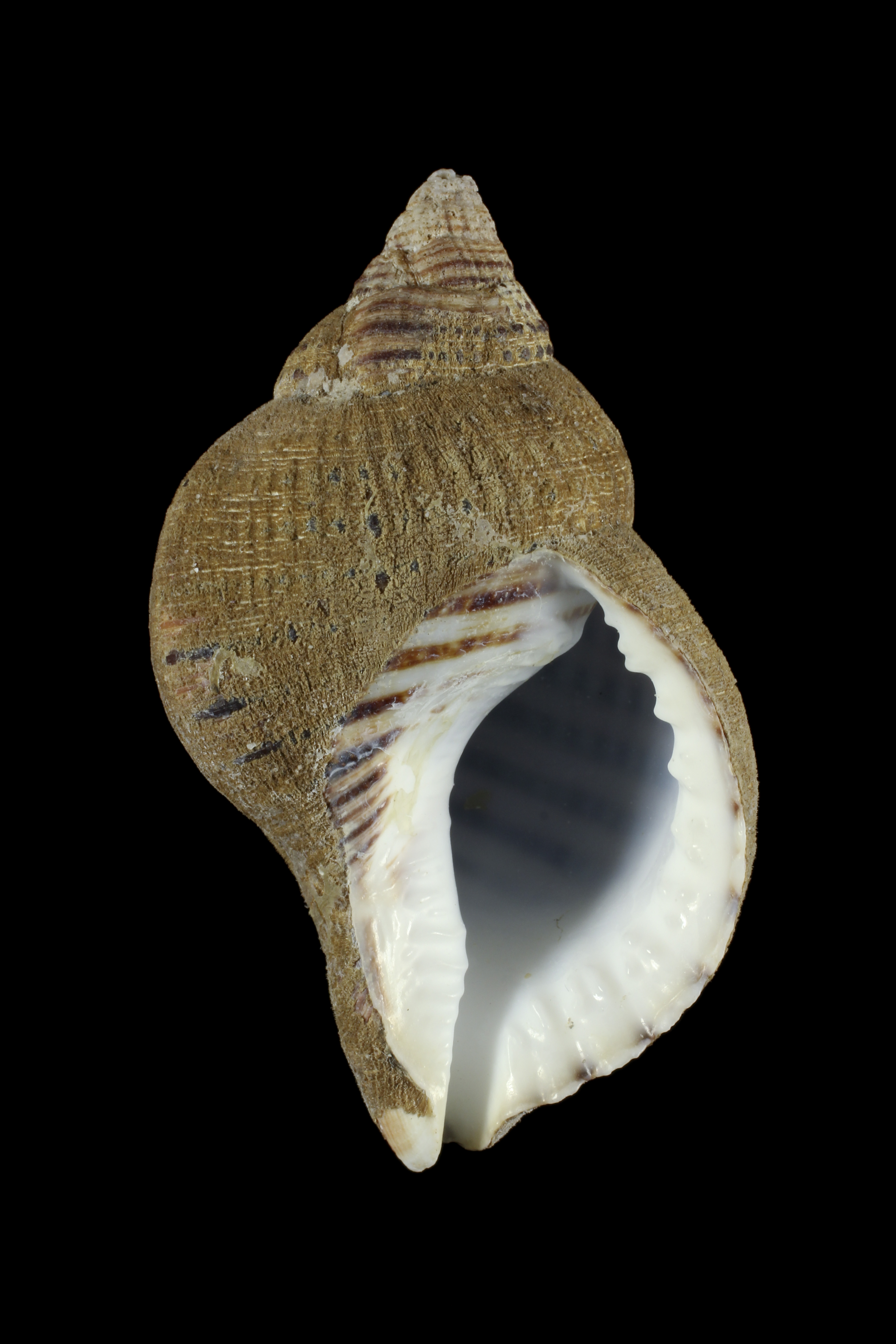
- Argobuccinum pustulosum

Scientific classification
- Kingdom: Animalia
- Phylum: Mollusca
- Class: Gastropoda
- Subclass: Caenogastropoda
- Order: Littorinimorpha
- Superfamily: Tonnoidea
- Family: Cymatiidae; Iredale, 1913 (1854)

Genera
- see text

Synonyms
- Cymatiinae Powell, 1933

= Cymatiidae =

Family of gastropods

Cymatiidae is a family of large sea snails in the superfamily Tonnoidea and the order Littorinimorpha. Members of this family are predators.

== Genera ==
The family Cymatiidae contains the following genera:

- Argobuccinum Herrmannsen, 1846
- Austrosassia Finlay, 1931
- Austrotriton Cossmann, 1903
- Cabestana Röding, 1798
- Cymatiella Iredale, 1924
- Cymatium Roding, 1798
- Cymatona Iredale, 1929
- Distorsomina Beu, 1998
- Fusitriton Cossmann, 1903
- Gelagna Schauffus, 1869
- Gutturnium Mørch, 1852
- Gyrineum Link, 1807
- Halgyrineum Beu, 1998
- † Haurokoa C. A. Fleming, 1955
- Linatella Gray, 1857
- Lotoria Emerson & Old, 1963
- Monoplex Perry, 1810
- Personella Conrad, 1865
- Proxicharonia Powell, 1938
- Ranularia Schumacher, 1817
- Reticutriton Habe & Kosuge, 1966
- Sassia Bellardi, 1873
- Septa Perry, 1810
- Turritriton Dall, 1904
