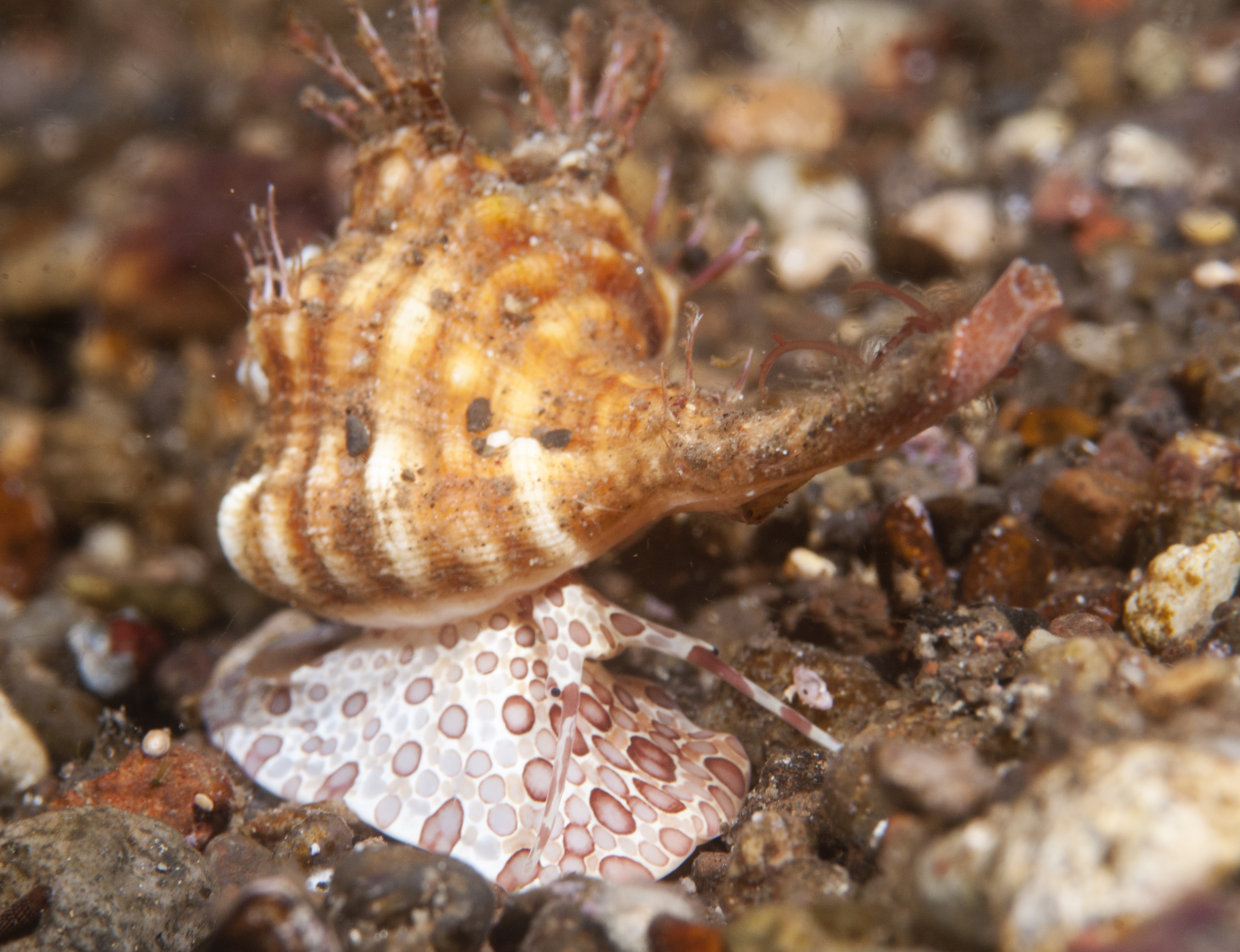
- A live individual of a Cymatium species near Alor Island, Indonesia

Scientific classification
- Kingdom: Animalia
- Phylum: Mollusca
- Class: Gastropoda
- Subclass: Caenogastropoda
- Order: Littorinimorpha
- Family: Cymatiidae
- Genus: Cymatium; Röding, 1798

Type species
- Cymatium femorale Linnaeus, 1758

Synonyms
- Cymatium (Linatella) Gray, 1857; Linatella Gray, 1857; Lotorium Montfort, 1810; Luterium Herrmannsen, 1846 (emendation of Lotorium Montfort, 1810); Nyctilochus Gistel, 1848; Tritocurrus Lesson, 1842

= Cymatium (gastropod) =

Cymatium Temporal range: Eocene - Recent

Genus of gastropods

Cymatium is a genus of small to large predatory sea snails, marine gastropod mollusks in the family Cymatiidae.

This genus has numerous species, perhaps as many as 100, some of which have a worldwide distribution. The genus has been divided into at least 10 subgenera. Some authors have elevated those subgenera, giving them the full status of genera, but this is by no means universally accepted.

== Fossil records ==
This genus is known in the fossil records from the Eocene to the Quaternary (age range: from 55.8 to 0.012 million years ago).

== Description ==
These sea snails have separate sexes. They lay egg capsules. After hatching, the larvae have a planktonic stage that can (in some species) last several months; this is what enables the very widespread distribution seen in certain species, as the planktonic larvae can be carried great distances before settling to the sea floor.

== Subgenera ==
There are at least 10 subgenera within the genus Cymatium . These are elevated by some authors to the level of genera.

- Cymatium Röding, 1798, type species: Cymatium femorale
- Monoplex G. Perry, 1811, type species: Cymatium parthenopeum
- Gelagna Schaufuss, 1869, type species: Cymatium succinctum
- Ranularia Schumacher, 1817, type species: Cymatium gutturnium
- Gutturnium Mørch, 1852, type species: Cymatium muricinum
- Reticutriton Habe and Kosuge, 1966, type species: Cymatium pfeifferianum
- Linatella Gray, 1868, type species: Cymatium cutaceum
- Lotoria Emerson and Old, 1963, type species: Cymatium perryi
- Septa Perry, 1810, type species: Septa rubecula: considered as a genus in WoRMS
- Turritriton Dall, 1904, type species: Cymatium gibbosum

== Species ==
According to the World Register of Marine Species (WoRMS) the following species with accepted names are included within the genus Cymatium:

- Cymatium femorale (Linnaeus, 1758)
- Cymatium raderi D’Attilio & Myers, 1984
- Cymatium ranzanii (Bianconi, 1850)
- Cymatium tigrinum (Broderip, 1833)

== Gallery ==
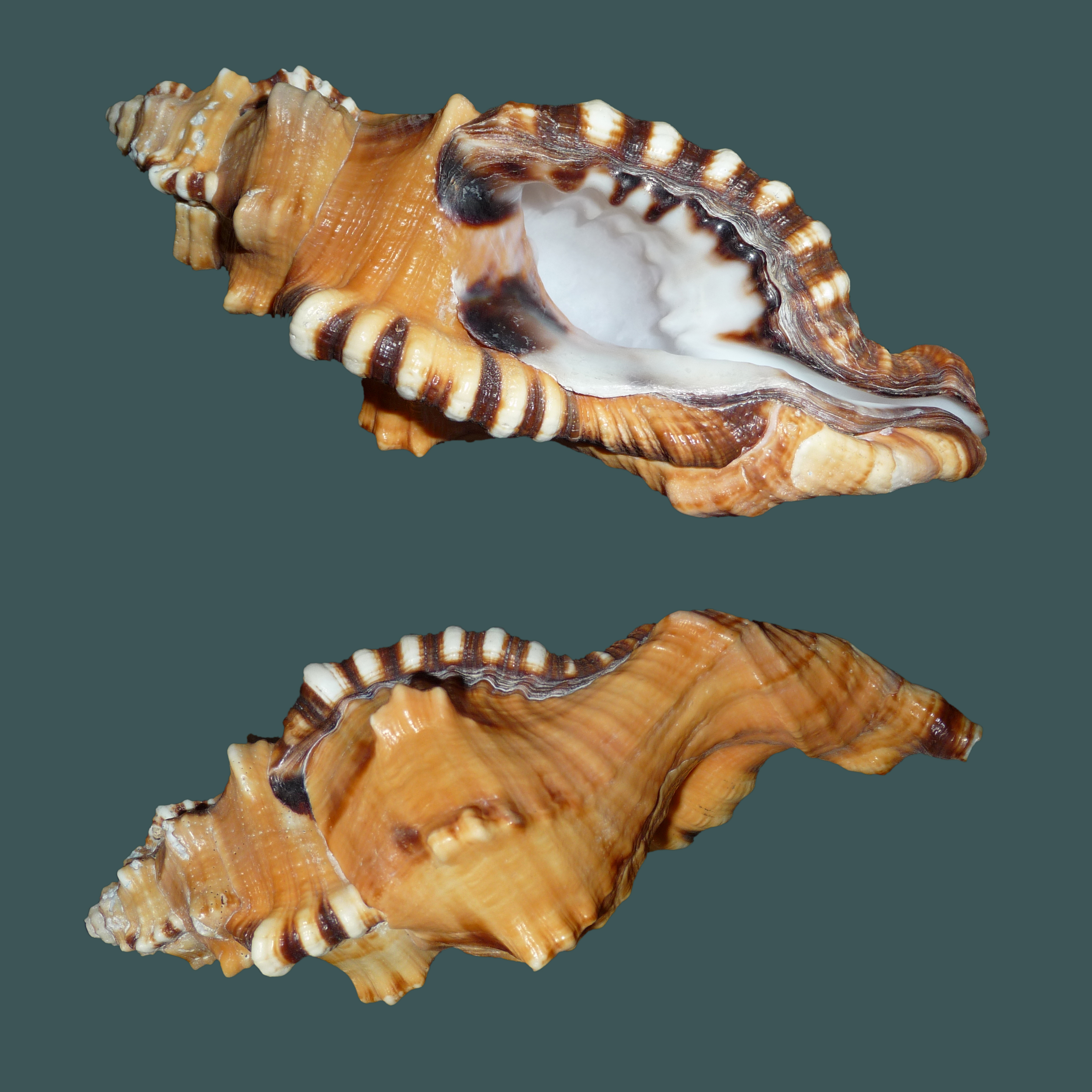
Two views of a shell of Cymatium lotorium

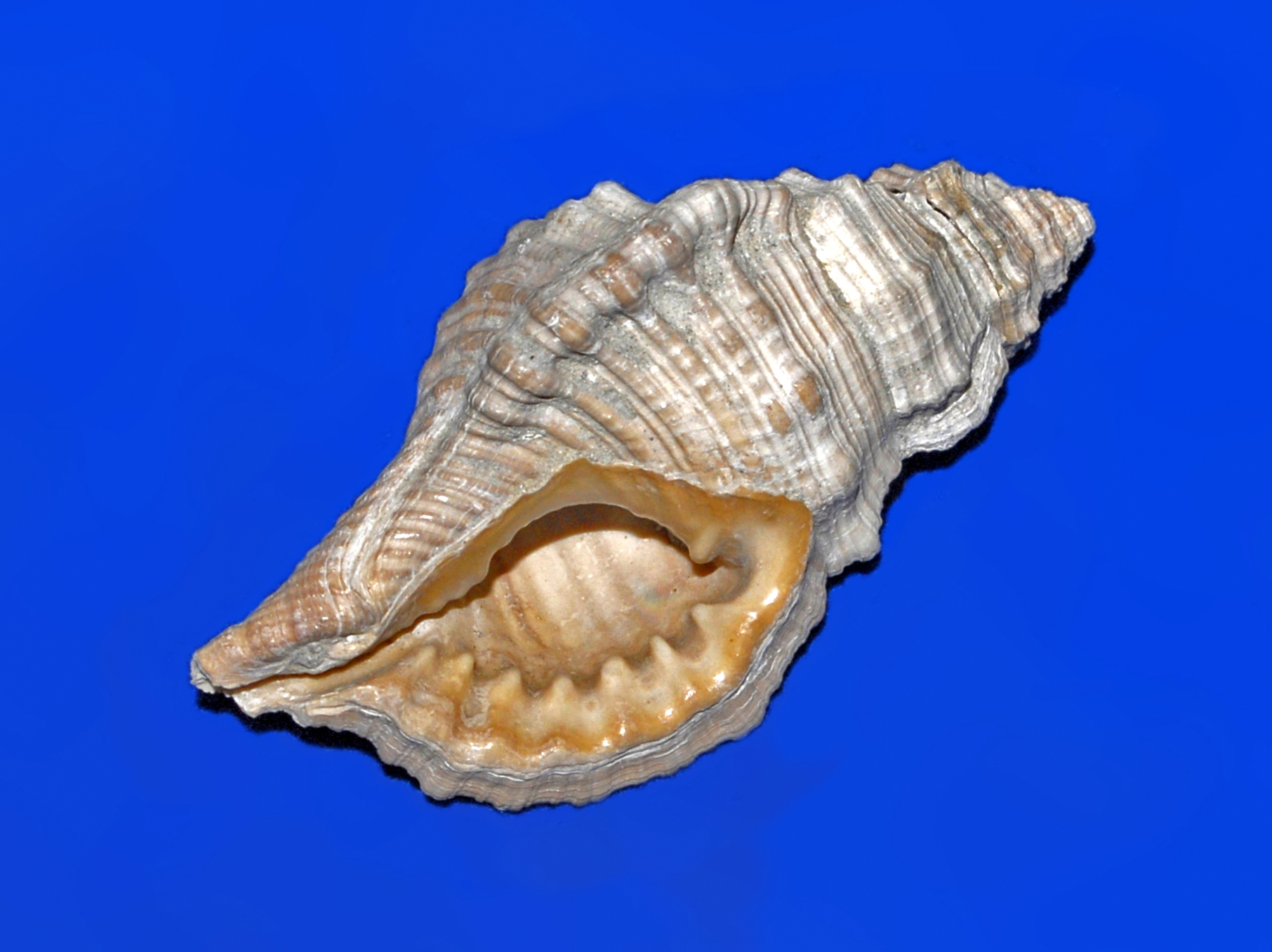
Fossil shell of Cymatium affine from Pliocene of Italy

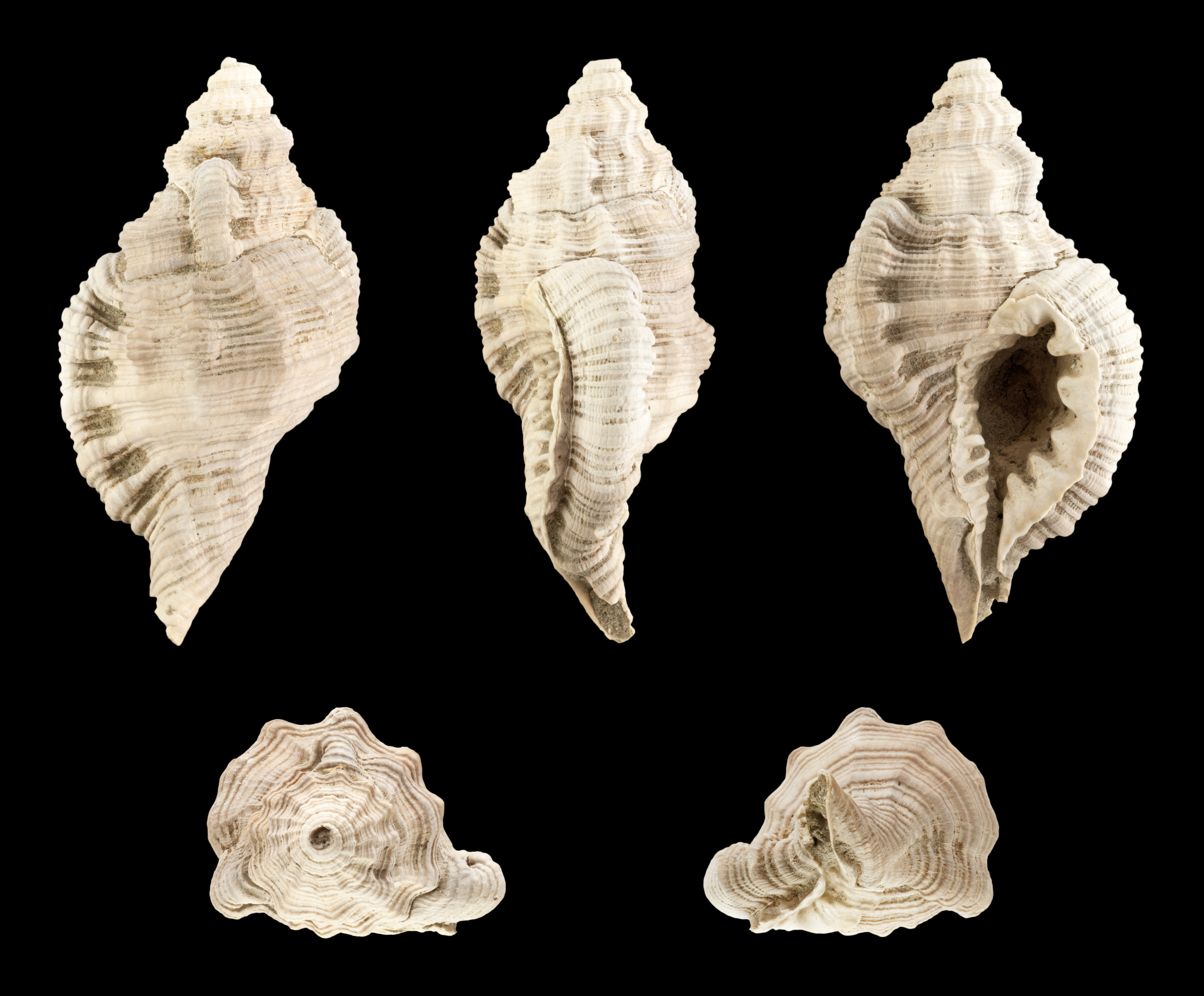
Fossil shell of Cymatium doderleini from Pliocene of Italy

== Species brought into synonymy ==
- Cymatium aegrotum (Reeve, 1844): synonym of Ranularia gallinago (Reeve, 1844)
- Cymatium aquatile (Reeve, 1844) : synonym of Monoplex aquatilis (Reeve, 1844)
- Cymatium cingulatum (Lamarck, 1822): synonym of Linatella caudata (Gmelin, 1791)
- Cymatium clandestinum (Lamarck, 1816): synonym of Gelagna succincta (Linnaeus, 1771)
- Cymatium closeli Beu, 1987: synonym of Septa closeli (Beu, 1987)
- Cymatium comptum (A. Adams, 1855) : synonym of Monoplex comptus (A. Adams, 1855)
- Cymatium corrugatum (Lamarck, 1816);: synonym of Monoplex corrugatus (Lamarck, 1816)
- Cymatium cutaceum (Lamarck, 1816): synonym of Linatella caudata (Gmelin, 1791)
- Cymatium cynocephalum (Lamarck, 1816) : synonym of Ranularia cynocephala (Lamarck, 1816)
- Cymatium doliarium Lamarck: synonym of Cabestana dolaria (Linnaeus, 1767)
- Cymatium durbanensis (E.A. Smith, 1899): synonym of Monoplex durbanensis (E.A. Smith, 1899)
- Cymatium exaratum (Reeve, 1844): synonym of Monoplex exaratus (Reeve, 1844)
- Cymatium exaratum durbanense (E. A. Smith, 1899): synonym of Cymatium exaratum (Reeve, 1844) accepted as Monoplex exaratus (Reeve, 1844)
- Cymatium exile: synonym of Ranularia exilis (Reeve, 1844)
- Cymatium gallinago (Reeve, 1844): synonym of Ranularia gallinago (Reeve, 1844)
- Cymatium gemmatum Reeve: synonym of Monoplex gemmatus (Reeve, 1844)
- Cymatium gibbosum (Broderip, 1833): synonym of Turritriton gibbosus (Broderip, 1833)
- Cymatium grandimaculatum (Reeve, 1844): synonym of Lotoria grandimaculata (Reeve, 1844)
- Cymatium hepaticum (Röding, 1798): synonym of Septa hepatica (Röding, 1798)
- Cymatium kleinei (Sowerby III, 1889): synonym of Monoplex klenei (G.B. Sowerby III, 1889)
- Cymatium kobelti: synonym of Turritriton kobelti (Maltzan, 1884)
- Cymatium krebsii (Mörch, 1877) : synonym of Monoplex krebsii (Mörch, 1877)
- Cymatium labiosum (W. Wood, 1828) : synonym of Turritriton labiosus (Wood, 1828)
- Cymatium lotorium (Linnaeus, 1758): synonym of Lotoria lotoria (Linnaeus, 1758)
- Cymatium marerubrum: synonym of Septa marerubrum (Garcia-Talavera, 1985)
- Cymatium martinianum (d'Orbigny, 1847) : synonym of Monoplex martinianus (d'Orbigny, 1847)
- Cymatium moniliferum (Adams & Reeve, 1850): synonym of Ranularia monilifera (A. Adams & Reeve, 1850)
- Cymatium moritinctum (Reeve, 1844): synonym of Ranularia cynocephala (Lamarck, 1816)
- Cymatium mundum (Gould, 1849): synonym of Monoplex mundus (Gould, 1849)
- Cymatium muricinum (Röding, 1798) : synonym of Gutturnium muricinum (Röding, 1798)
- Cymatium nicobaricum (Röding, 1798) : synonym of Monoplex nicobaricus (Röding, 1798)
- Cymatium occidentale (Mörch, 1877) is a synonym of Septa occidentalis (Mörch, 1877)
- Cymatium olearium Linnaeus: synonym of Ranella olearium (Linnaeus, 1758)
- Cymatium (Septa) parthenopeum (von Salis, 1793) : synonym of Monoplex parthenopeus (Salis Marschlins, 1793)
- Cymatium (Monoplex) parthenopeum (Salis, 1793): synonym of Monoplex parthenopeus (Salis Marschlins, 1793)
- Cymatium penniketi Beu, 1998: synonym of Monoplex penniketi (Beu, 1998)
- Cymatium pharcidum (Dall, 1889): synonym of Turritriton tenuiliratus (Lischke, 1873)
- Cymatium pfeifferianum (Reeve, 1844): synonym of Reticutriton pfeifferianus (Reeve, 1844)
- Cymatium pileare (Linnaeus, 1758): synonym of Monoplex pilearis (Linnaeus, 1758)
- Cymatium pyrum (Linnaeus, 1758): synonym of Ranularia pyrum (Linnaeus, 1758)
- Cymatium rubeculum (Linnaeus, 1758): synonym of Septa rubecula (Linnaeus, 1758)
- Cymatium sarcostomum (Reeve, 1844): synonym of Ranularia sarcostoma (Reeve, 1844)
- Cymatium (Ranularia) sinense (Reeve, 1844): synonym of Ranularia sinensis (Reeve, 1844)
- Cymatium (Linatella) succinctum (Linnaeus, 1771): synonym of Linatella succincta (Linnaeus, 1771)
- Cymatium testudinarium (A. Adams & Reeve, 1850): synonym of Ranularia testudinaria (A. Adams & Reeve, 1850)
- Cymatium tranquebaricum (Lamarck, 1816): synonym of Monoplex tranquebaricus (Lamarck, 1816)
- Cymatium trigonum (Gmelin, 1791): synonym of Monoplex trigonus (Gmelin, 1791)
- Cymatium trilineatum: synonym of Ranularia trilineata (Reeve, 1844)
- Cymatium vespaceum Lamarck, 1822: synonym of Monoplex vespaceus (Lamarck, 1822)

Cymatium species found in the Western Atlantic include:

- Cymatium rehderi A. H. Verrill, 1950 : synonym of Ranularia rehderi (A.H. Verrill, 1950)

Other species include:

- Cymatium tabulatus a.k.a. Turritriton tabulatus exaratus (Reeve, 1844)
- Cymatium parkinsonianum (Perry, 1811): synonym of Austrotriton parkinsonius Perry, 1811
- Cymatium pileare (Linnaeus, 1758): synonym of Cymatium (Septa) pileare (Linnaeus, 1758)
- Cymatium perryi Emerson, W.K. & W.E. Jr. Old, 1963: synonym of Lotoria perryi (Emerson & Old, 1963)
