= Camillo Ranzani =

Italian priest and naturalist

Reverend Camillo Ranzani
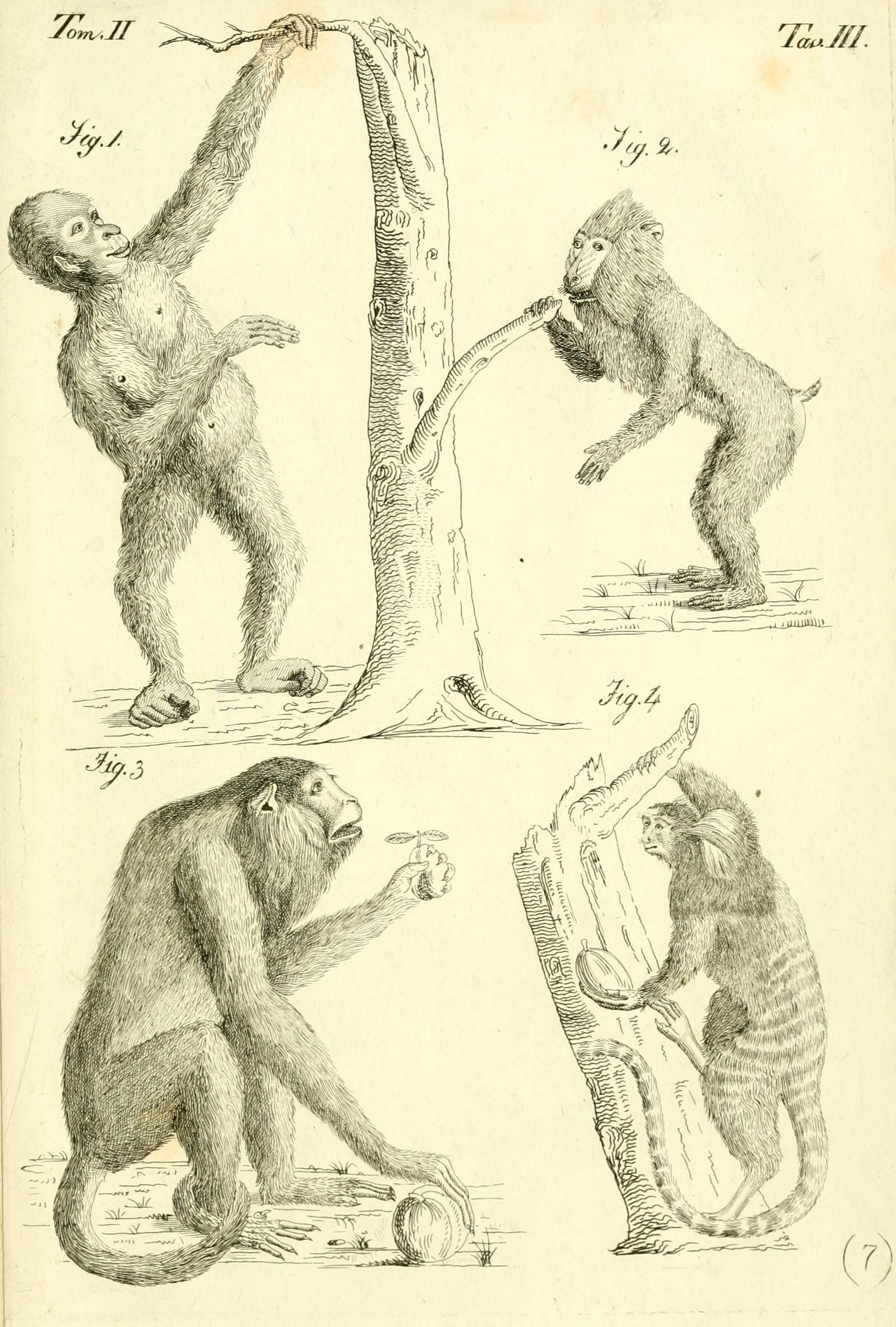
- Elementi di zoologia (1819) by Camillo Ranzani
- Born: June 21, 1775; Bologna, Papal States
- Died: 23 April 1841 (aged 65); Bologna, Papal States
- Occupations: Catholic priest, university teacher, naturalist
- Parent(s): Tommaso Ranzani and Francesca Ranzani (née Sgarzi)

Academic background
- Education: University of Bologna
- Academic advisor: Giuseppe Vogli
- Influences: Alberto Fortis; Georges Cuvier; Bernard Germain de Lacépède

Academic work
- Discipline: Natural history, zoology, geology, paleontology
- Institutions: University of Bologna
- Notable students: Giovanni Giuseppe Bianconi; Pierre Léonard Vander Linden

Camillo Ranzani (22 June 1775 – 23 April 1841, Bologna) was an Italian priest and a naturalist. He was director of the Museum of Natural History of Bologna from 1803 to 1841 (now the Museum of Comparative Anatomy, one of the museums of the University of Bologna). Ranzani wrote Elementi di zoologia which was published in Bologna from 1819 to 1825.

== Biography ==
Camillo Ranzani was born at Bologna on June 22, 1775, son to a poor family. He attended the Piarist school in his native town. His talent attracted the notice of Giovanni Battista Respighi, a priest of the congregation of the Oratory. Through the assistance of Respighi, Ranzani entered the University of Bologna. He distinguished himself so much in the philosophical course that, even before he had completed his studies, he was occasionally employed by the professor Giuseppe Vogli as his substitute. When he was but twenty-two years of age, he was selected to fill the chair of philosophy at Fano, where he entered holy orders. He taught in Fano until 1798, when the French invasion of the Papal States compelled him to return to Bologna, where he was appointed keeper of the botanical garden.

In 1803, Ranzani was appointed professor of natural history at the university of Bologna. The French naturalist Georges Cuvier met him in Bologna in 1810 and was so impressed by his knowledge that he invited him to Paris where he spent fourteen months. Ranzani returned to Bologna with a considerable collection of books, minerals, fossils, and other appliances of natural history.

During the early part of his professorship he had been a frequent contributor to the scientific journals of Italy, France, and Germany, and taken an active part in the proceedings of most of the Italian scientific and literary societies; but it was not till 1819 that he commenced the publication of his great work, Elementi di Zoologia. The first volume, published in that year, contains the general introduction to zoology; the second, on mammals, was published in 1820; and was followed in 1821 and the succeeding years by the successive volumes as far as the tenth, at which the work was interrupted, partly by the ill-health of the author, partly by his occupations as rector of the university, to which office he was named in 1824 by the pope Leo XII. Though he had already prepared great part of the materials necessary for its completion, and although the many articles contributed by him to various journals of natural history amply demonstrate the extent and accuracy of his knowledge, the work has unfortunately been left incomplete.

In 1836 Ranzani undertook a course of lectures on Geology, a science which up to that time was regarded with much suspicion in the Italian universities. He had the honour of introducing to his countrymen the discoveries of Buckland, Lyell, De la Beche, and the other members of the English school. His ability in this branch of science had been recognized even at an early period by Cuvier, who freely confessed his obligations to Ranzani for some important information of which he availed himself in his great work, Le Règne Animal. Ranzani was engaged in preparing for the press a treatise on geology, containing the substance of his lectures during the five years from 1836 till 1841, when he died on April 28, 1841. His disciple Giovanni Giuseppe Bianconi succeeded him as professor of natural history at the university of Bologna.

== Works ==
A catalogue of his miscellaneous essays, lectures, dissertations, and contributions to periodical literature, will be found in the Memorie di Religione, di Morale, e di Letteratura, published at Modena in 1843 (Continuazione, vol. XV, pp. 401, 402).

== Taxa ==
Animals named in honour of Ranzani include:

- Ranzania Nardo, 1840, a genus of sunfish
- Cymatium ranzanii (Bianconi, 1850), a species of predatory sea snail

== See also ==
- Category:Taxa named by Camillo Ranzani

== Bibliography ==
- Kemer, W. (1804). "Einige Bemerkungen zu dem Schreiben des Hr. Prof. Camillo Ranzani zu Bologna, an den Hrn. Abt Lichtenstein zu Helmstädt, die Luftzoophyten betreffend". Magazin für den neuesten Zustand der Naturfreunde. 7: 412–41.
- Bertoloni, A. (1853). "Elogio storico di monsignor Camillo Ranzani". Memorie dell'Accademia delle Scienze dell'Istituto di Bologna. IV: 225–259.
