= William E. Old Jr. =

William Erwood Old Jr.
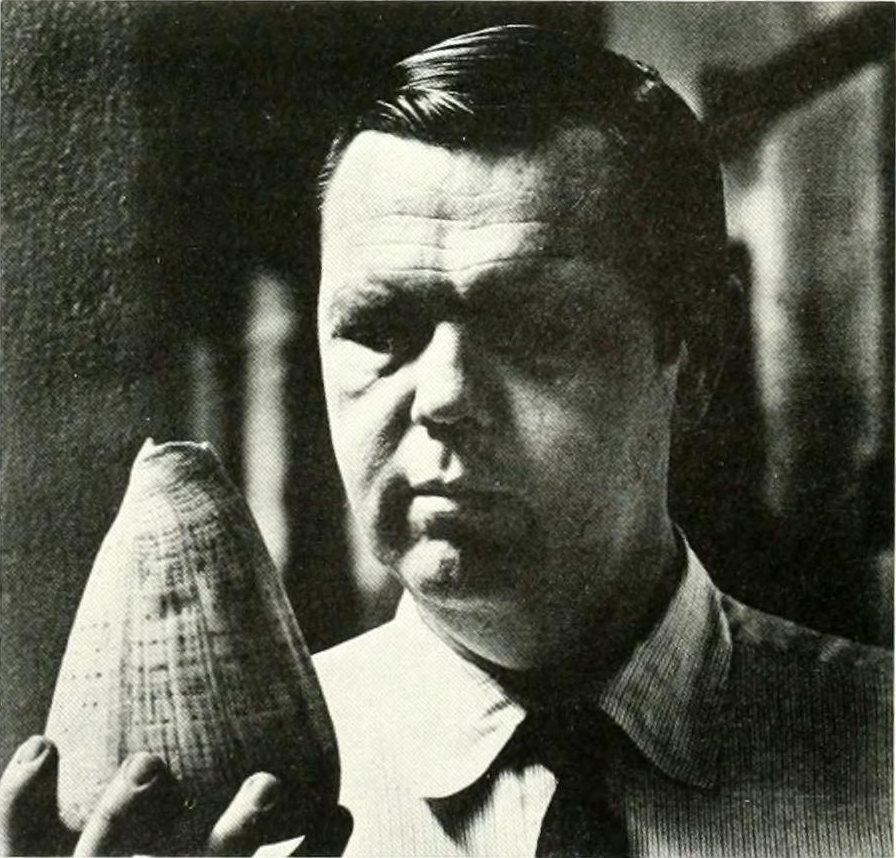
- William Erwood Old Jr.
- Born: April 14, 1928; Norfolk, Virginia, U.S.
- Died: December 31, 1982 (aged 54); New York City, U.S.
- Known for: specialist on marine molluscs
- Scientific career
- Fields: malacology
- Institutions: American Museum of Natural History

William Erwood Old Jr. usually known as Bill Old, (14 April 1928 – 31 December 1982) was an American malacologist.

He attended The College of William & Mary in Virginia. He served in the army during the Korean War.

He joined the American Museum of Natural History in 1960. He helped build the American Museum's mollusc collection into a leading research resource. He was the first collections manager in malacology at the American Museum of Natural History.

He became a specialist in marine molluscs. He was extremely devoted to his science and was well known as a shell show judge in many parts of the United States. He went on several expeditions including ones to the Galapagos and Mexico.

Old was president of the American Malacological Society from 1978 to 1979, and president of the New York Shell Club from 1963 to 1965.

He died of a heart attack in 1982.

== Bibliography ==
He authored or co-authored 36 papers. As junior author to William K. Emerson, he named several species of marine mollusks, including:

- Cymatium perryi Emerson & Old, 1963 - a sea snail or marine gastropod
