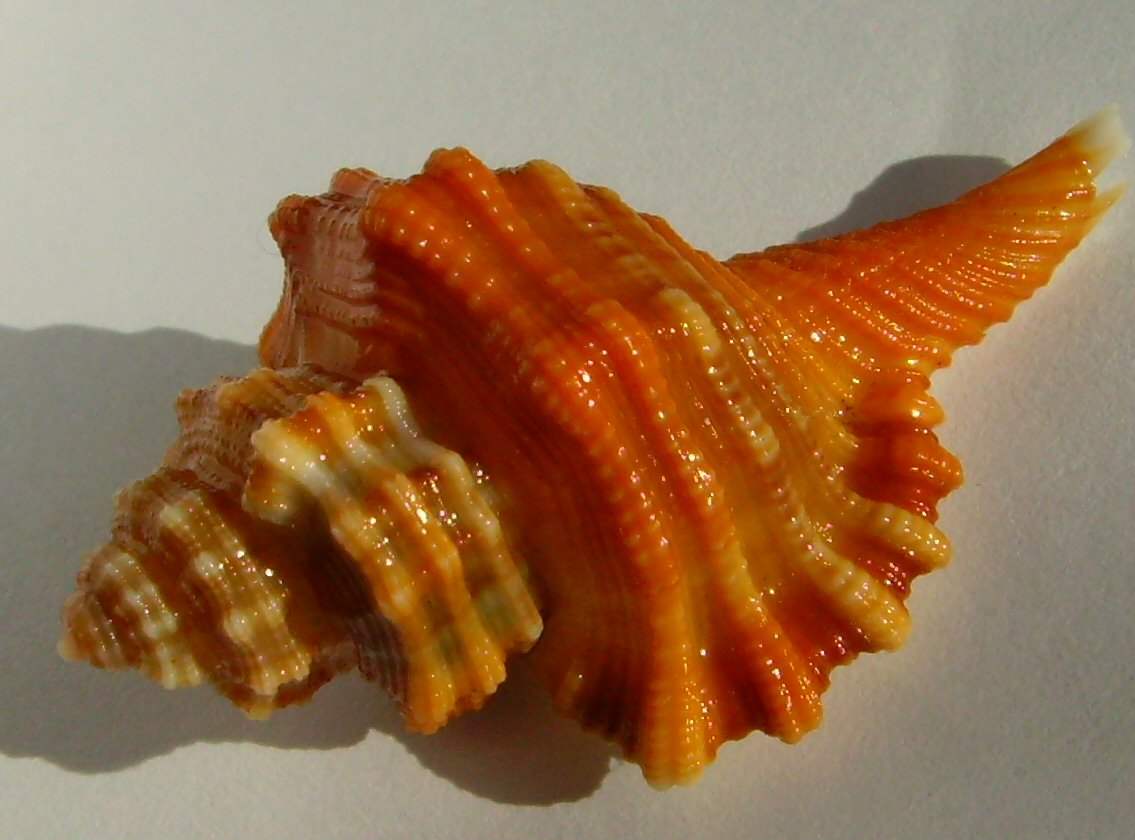
- Dorsal view of a shell of Turritriton tabulatus

Scientific classification
- Kingdom: Animalia
- Phylum: Mollusca
- Class: Gastropoda
- Subclass: Caenogastropoda
- Order: Littorinimorpha
- Family: Cymatiidae
- Genus: Turritriton; Dall, 1904

Type species
- Turritriton gibbosus (Broderip, 1833)

Synonyms
- Cabestana (Turritriton) Dall, 1904; Cymatium (Turritriton) Dall, 1904; Particymatium Iredale, 1936; Tritoniscus Dall, 1904

= Turritriton =

Genus of gastropods

Turritriton is a genus of medium-sized sea snails, marine gastropod molluscs in the family Cymatiidae. This is often still regarded merely as a subgenus of the genus Cymatium.

== Description ==
(Description as Tritoniscus) Forms with subturbinate body with flat-topped turriculate whorls, a short spire and siphonal canal, subumbilicate, with a single large and heavy terminal varix and narrow callus on the body.

== Distribution ==
This genus occurs in tropical and subtropical Indo-Pacific Oceans, western America, and the Caribbean Sea.

== Species ==
The genus Turritriton contains the following species:

- Turritriton fittkaui (Parth, 1991)
- Turritriton gibbosus (Broderip, 1833) - type species
- † Turritriton grundensis (R. Hoernes & Auinger, 1884)
- Turritriton kobelti (Von Maltzan, 1884)
- Turritriton labiosus (Wood, 1828)
- Turritriton pharcida (Dall, 1889)
- Turritriton tenuiliratus (Lischke, 1873)
