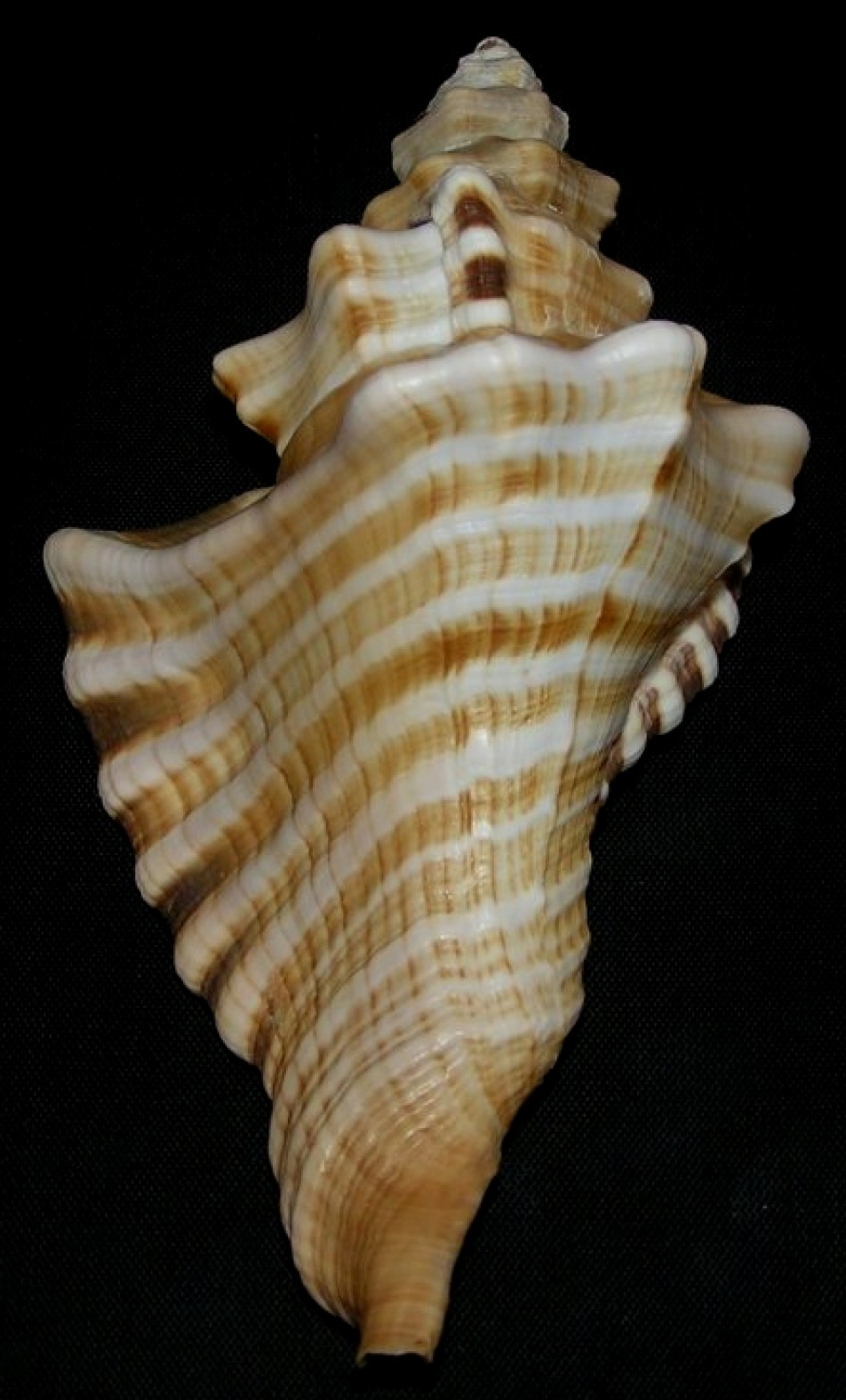

Scientific classification
- Kingdom: Animalia
- Phylum: Mollusca
- Class: Gastropoda
- Subclass: Caenogastropoda
- Order: Littorinimorpha
- Family: Cymatiidae
- Genus: Cymatium
- Species: C. ranzanii

Binomial name
- Cymatium ranzanii (Bianconi, 1850)

Synonyms
- Triton ranzanii Bianconi, 1850

= Cymatium ranzanii =

Species of gastropod

Cymatium ranzanii is a species of predatory sea snail, a marine gastropod mollusk in the family Cymatiidae.
