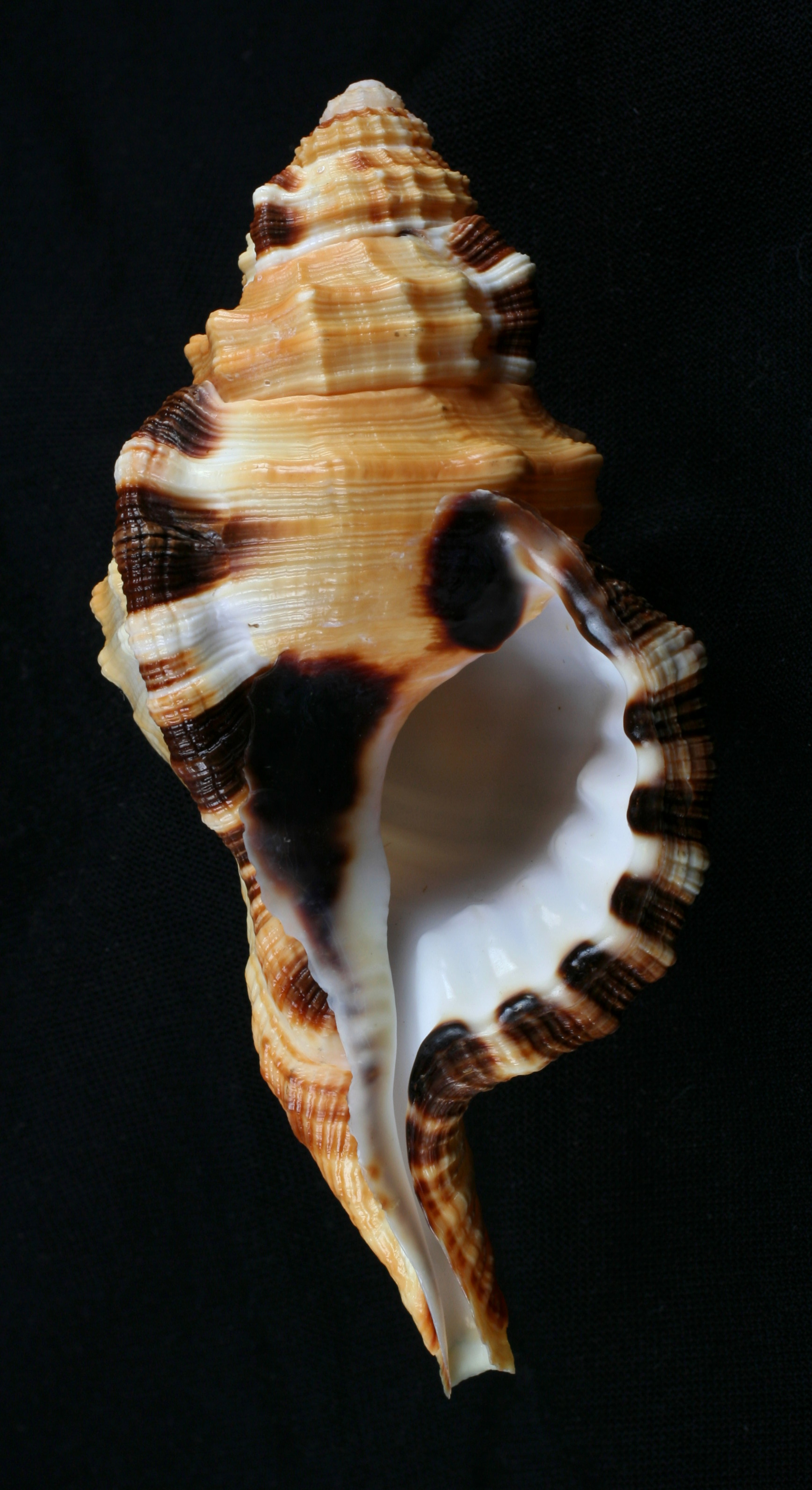
- Lotoria grandimaculata shell

Scientific classification
- Kingdom: Animalia
- Phylum: Mollusca
- Class: Gastropoda
- Subclass: Caenogastropoda
- Order: Littorinimorpha
- Family: Cymatiidae
- Genus: Lotoria; Emerson & Old, 1963

Type species
- Lotoria perryi (Emerson & Old, 1963)

Synonyms
- Cymatium (Lotoria) Emerson & Old, 1963

= Lotoria =

Genus of gastropods

Lotoria is a genus of predatory sea snails, marine gastropod mollusks in the family Cymatiidae.

== Description ==
The triangular whorls are coronated. The aperture is longer than the spire. The outer lip is dentated internally.

== Distribution ==
This genus occurs in the Indo-West Pacific and off the Philippines, Papua New Guinea, the Marquesas Islands and Australia (Queensland)

== Species ==
Species within the genus Lotoria include:

- Lotoria armata (G.B. Sowerby III, 1897)
- Lotoria grandimaculata (Reeve, 1844)
- Lotoria lotoria (Linnaeus, 1758)
- Lotoria triangularis (Perry, 1811)

Synonyms

- Lotoria perryi (Emerson & Old, 1963): synonym of Lotoria triangularis (Perry, 1811)
