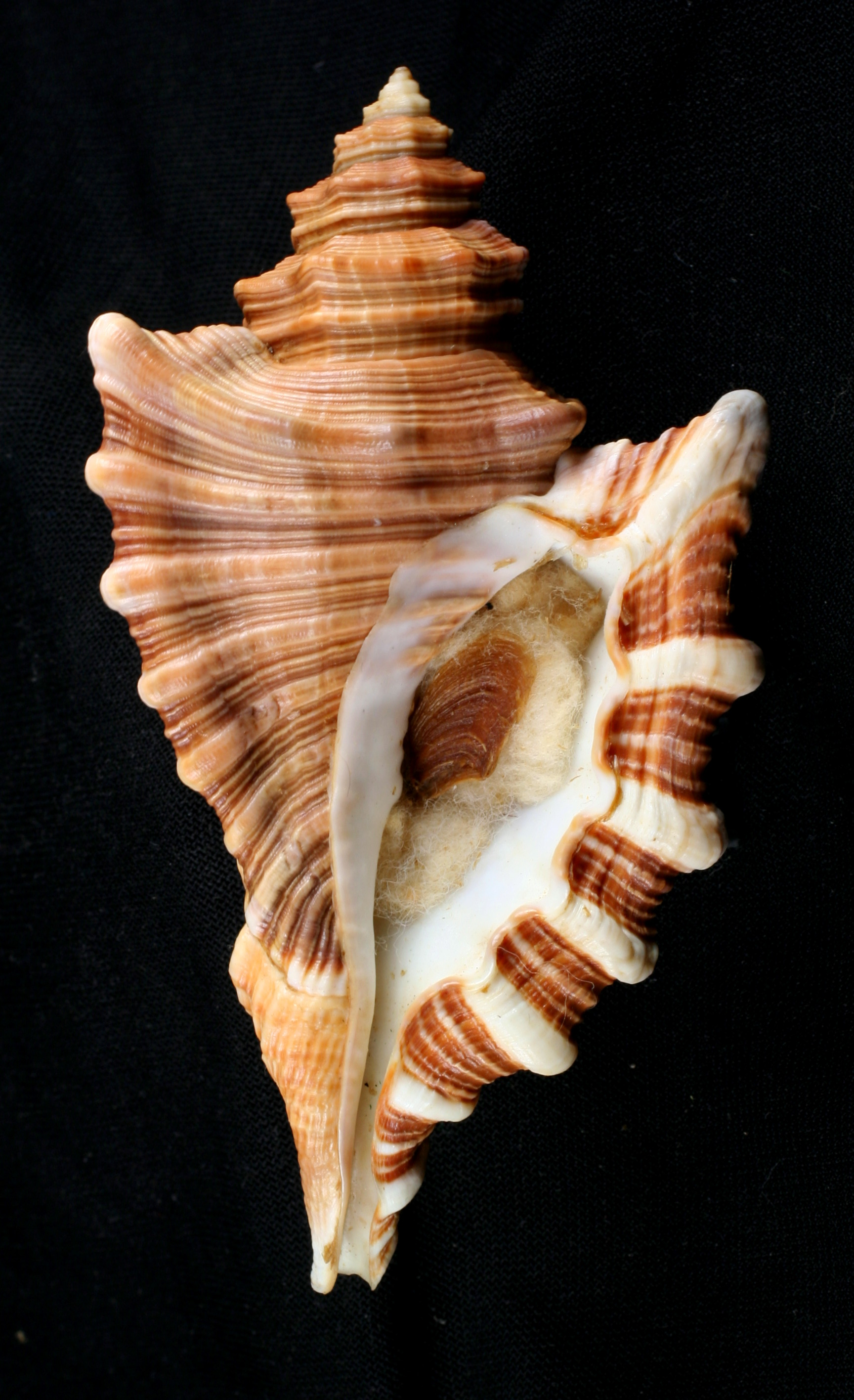
- Apertural view of the shell

Conservation status
- Secure (NatureServe)

Scientific classification
- Kingdom: Animalia
- Phylum: Mollusca
- Class: Gastropoda
- Subclass: Caenogastropoda
- Order: Littorinimorpha
- Family: Cymatiidae
- Genus: Cymatium
- Species: C. femorale

Binomial name
- Cymatium femorale (Linnaeus, 1758)

Synonyms
- Lotorium lotor Montfort, 1810; Murex femorale Linnaeus, 1758; Septa triangularis Perry, 1811; Triton lotorium Lamarck, 1816; Tritonium (Cymatium) femorale (Linnaeus, 1758)

= Cymatium femorale =

Species of gastropod

Cymatium femorale is a species of predatory sea snail in the family Cymatiidae. Its shell is commonly known as the angular triton shell and is frequently found in the West Indies.

== Description ==
The maximum recorded shell length is 175–212 mm. and an angular shell. It comes in a variety of colors, including brown, white, and gray. It has about 7 whorls in its shell with each whorl having two prominent axial varices forming sharp ridges. This shell also has spiral ridges patterned with coarse knobs that form large nodules at the lip of the shell. Its diet consists of other marine invertebrates, primarily clams, sea urchins, and other snails. It uses a toothed tongue-like structure (radula), to break through the shells of its prey. It is a broadcast spawner.

== Distribution ==
This species occurs in the Western Atlantic, particularly around the eastern Caribbean Antillean islands, and extends southward to Bahia, Brazil. It is considered a common shell in the West Indies.

== Habitat ==
Cymatium femorale inhabits shallow to moderately deep marine waters, ranging from a minimum recorded depth of 0.6 m to a maximum recorded depth of 150 m.
