= Turritriton kobelti =

Scientific classification
- Kingdom: Animalia
- Phylum: Mollusca
- Class: Gastropoda
- Subclass: Caenogastropoda
- Order: Littorinimorpha
- Family: Cymatiidae
- Genus: Turritriton
- Species: T. kobelti

Binomial name
- Turritriton kobelti (von Maltzan, 1884)

Synonyms
- Cymatium (Septa) kobelti (Maltzan, 1884); Cymatium kobelti (Maltzan, 1884); Triton kobelti Von Maltzan, 1884

Species of gastropod

Turritriton kobelti is a species of predatory sea snail, a marine gastropod mollusk in the family Cymatiidae.

This species is a possible synonym or subspecies of Turritriton gibbosus. The actual relationship between these taxons can only be correctly determined using a DNA-analysis.

== Description ==
The shell size varies between 14 mm and 42 mm.

== Distribution ==
This species is found in European waters and in the Atlantic Ocean off Angola, Gabon, Cape Verde, Ghana, and Senegal.
