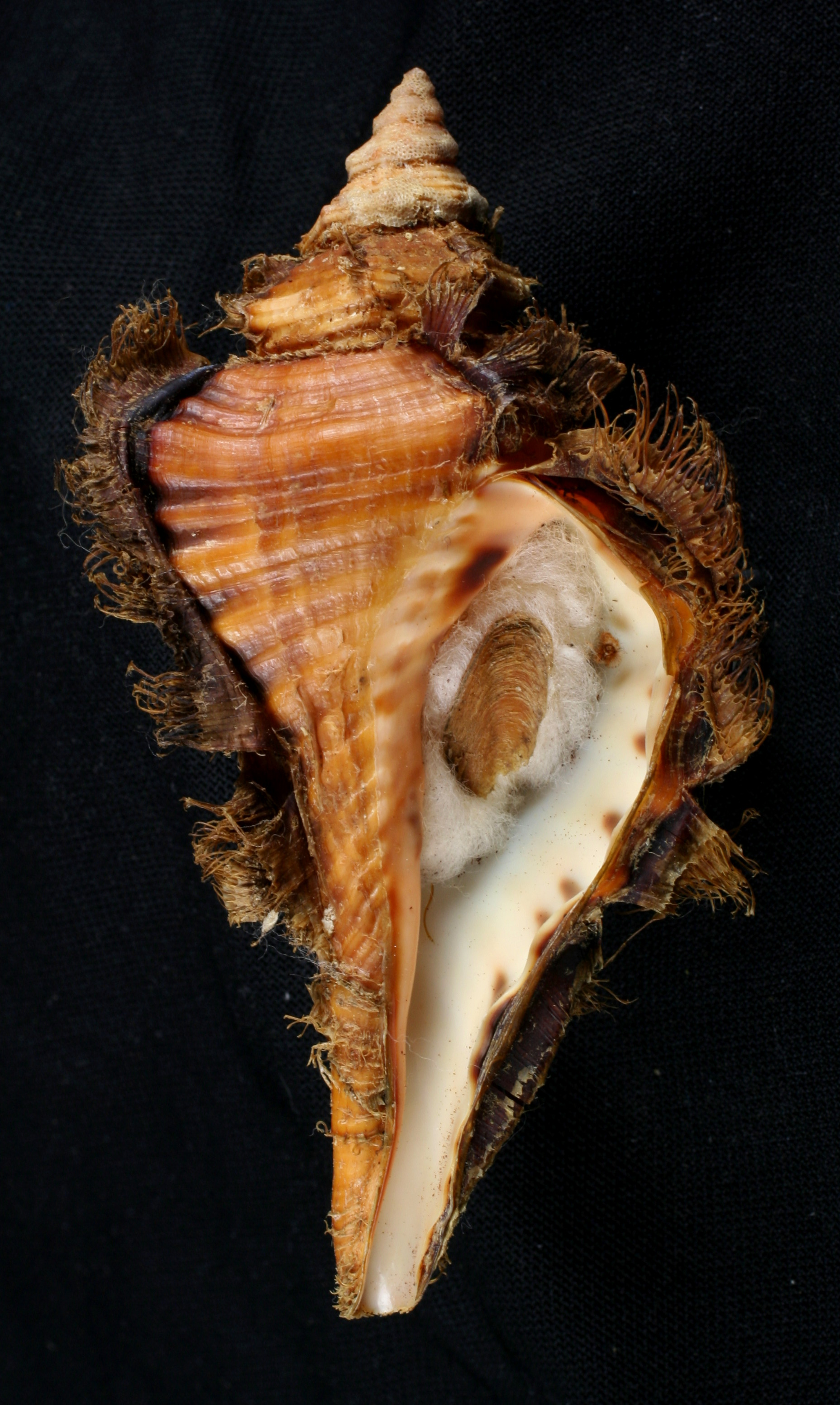
- Apertural view of the shell with operculum and periostracum partially attached

Scientific classification
- Kingdom: Animalia
- Phylum: Mollusca
- Class: Gastropoda
- Subclass: Caenogastropoda
- Order: Littorinimorpha
- Family: Cymatiidae
- Genus: Cymatium
- Species: C. tigrinum

Binomial name
- Cymatium tigrinum (Broderip, 1833)

Synonyms
- Tritocurrus amphytridis Lesson, 1842; Triton tigrinum Broderip, 1833

= Cymatium tigrinum =

Species of gastropod

Cymatium tigrinum is a species of predatory sea snail in the family Cymatiidae.
