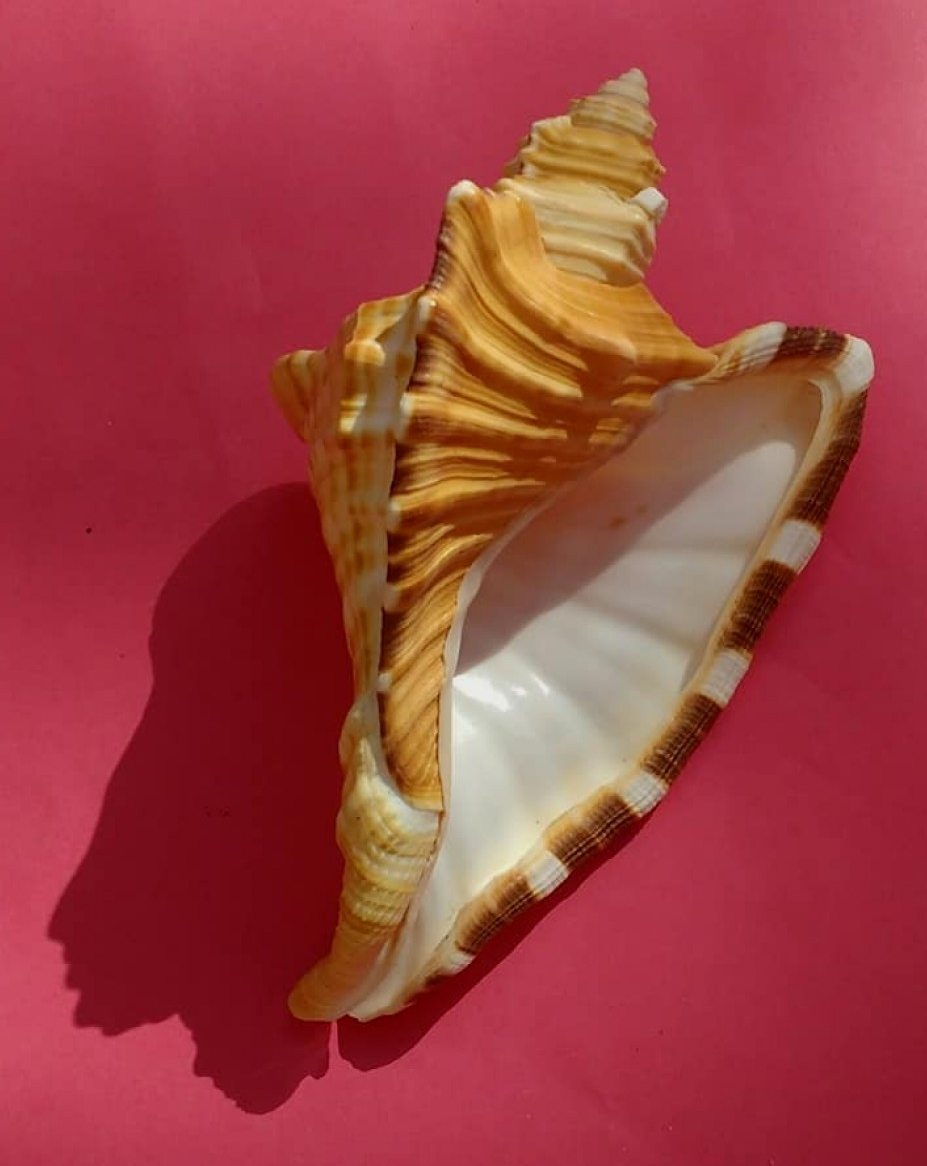

Scientific classification
- Kingdom: Animalia
- Phylum: Mollusca
- Class: Gastropoda
- Subclass: Caenogastropoda
- Order: Littorinimorpha
- Family: Cymatiidae
- Genus: Cymatium
- Species: C. raderi

Binomial name
- Cymatium raderi D’Attilio & Myers, 1984

Synonyms
- Cymatium etcheversi Macsotay & Campos Villarroel, 1993

= Cymatium raderi =

Species of gastropod

Cymatium raderi is a species of predatory sea snail.It is marine gastropod mollusk in the family Cymatiidae.

== Distribution ==
Cymatium raderi lives 2 metres below sea level, in turtle grass beds.

It lives in the western Atlantic Ocean, the Caribbean, Puerto Rico, and North Brazil.

== Description ==
The maximum recorded shell length is 240 mm.

== Habitat ==
Its minimum recorded depth is 0 m(at the surface.) Its maximum recorded depth is 46 m.
