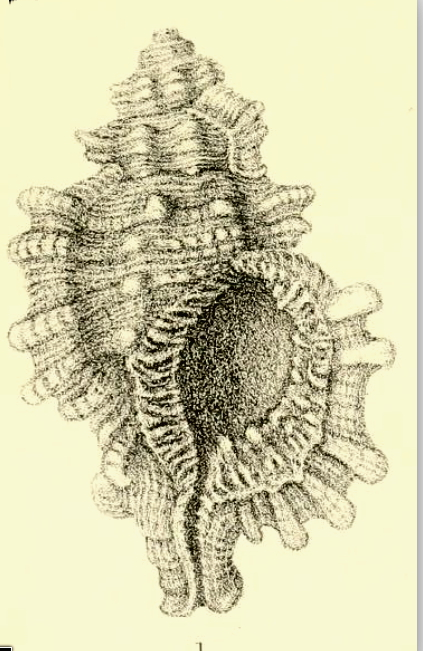
- Drawing of a shell of Lotoria armata (holotype)

Scientific classification
- Kingdom: Animalia
- Phylum: Mollusca
- Class: Gastropoda
- Subclass: Caenogastropoda
- Order: Littorinimorpha
- Superfamily: Tonnoidea
- Family: Cymatiidae
- Genus: Lotoria
- Species: L. armata

Binomial name
- Lotoria armata (G.B. Sowerby III, 1897)

Synonyms
- Cymatium (Ranularia) armatum (G.B. Sowerby III, 1897); Cymatium armatum (G.B. Sowerby III, 1897); Lotorium armatum G.B. Sowerby III, 1897

= Lotoria armata =

Species of gastropod

Lotoria armata is a species of predatory sea snail, a marine gastropod mollusk in the family Cymatiidae.

== Description ==
The shell has short spines surrounding it. The length of the shell attains 72 mm, its maximum diameter 42 mm.

== Distribution ==
This marine species occurs off New Caledonia, Vanuatu, Fiji and Australia (Queensland). In shallow water up to 20m deep.
