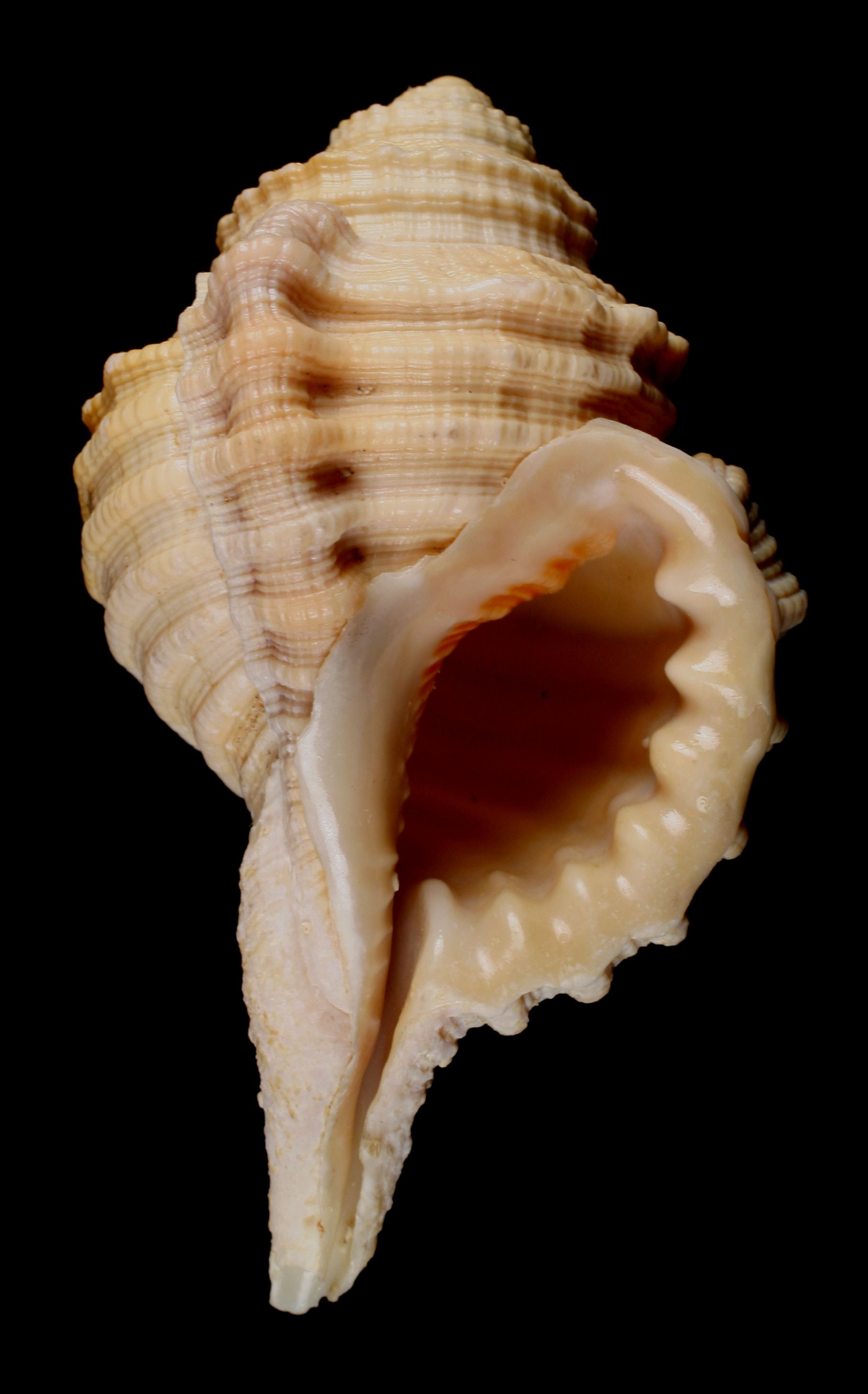
- Apertural view of a shell of Ranularia cynocephala (Lamarck, 1816)

Scientific classification
- Kingdom: Animalia
- Phylum: Mollusca
- Class: Gastropoda
- Subclass: Caenogastropoda
- Order: Littorinimorpha
- Family: Cymatiidae
- Genus: Ranularia
- Species: R. cynocephala

Binomial name
- Ranularia cynocephala (Lamarck, 1816)

Synonyms
- Cymatium (Ranularia) caribbaeum Clench & Turner, 1957; Cymatium (Ranularia) sarcostumum Clench & Turner 1957; Cymatium cynocephalum (Lamarck, 1816); Cymatium moritinctum (Reeve, 1844); Eutritonium moritinctum Reeve; Triton cynocephalum Lamarck, 1816; Triton moritinctus Reeve, 1844

= Ranularia cynocephala =

Species of gastropod

Ranularia cynocephala is a species of predatory sea snail, a marine gastropod mollusk in the family Cymatiidae.

== Description ==
The maximum recorded shell length is 84 mm.

== Habitat and distribution ==
The minimum recorded depth for this species is 0 m; the maximum recorded depth is 137 m.
