= Giovanni Giuseppe Bianconi =

Italian zoologist, herpetologist, botanist and geologist

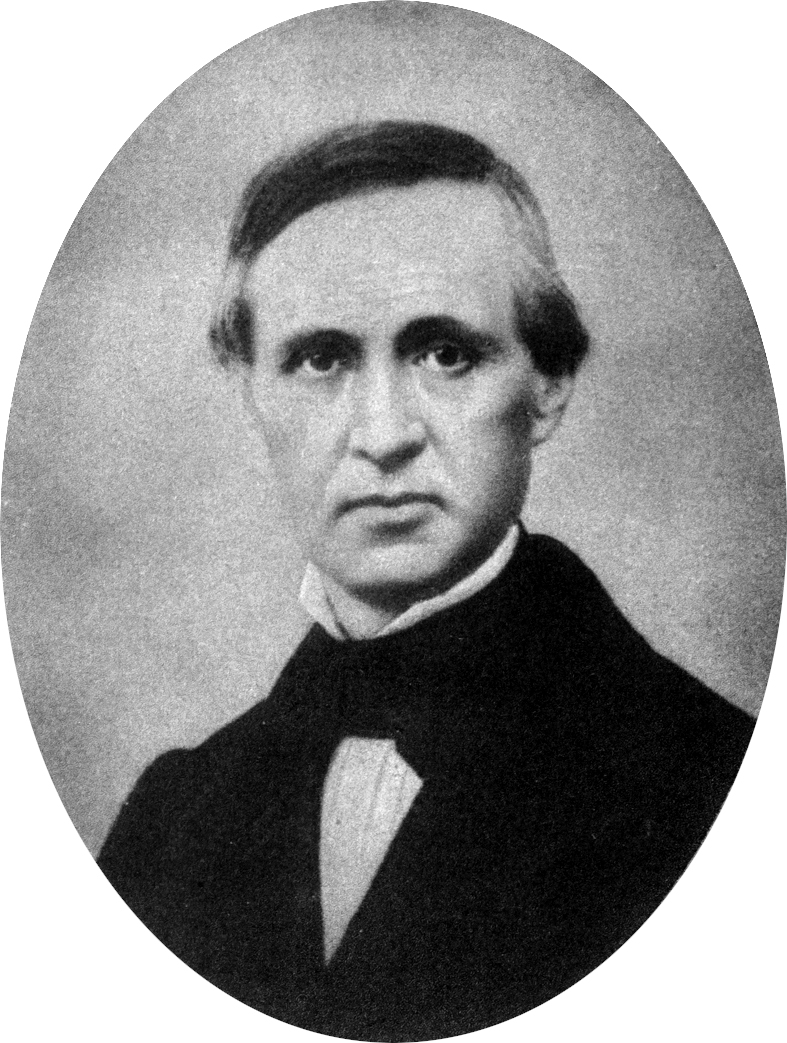
- Giovanni Giuseppe Bianconi
- Born: July 31, 1809; Bologna, Papal States
- Died: 18 October 1878 (aged 69); Bologna, Kingdom of Italy
- Occupations: University teacher, naturalist
- Spouse: Vittoria Bignardi
- Children: 3
- Parent(s): Giovanni Antonio Bianconi and Luisa Bianconi (née Garnier)

Academic background
- Education: University of Bologna
- Academic advisor: Camillo Ranzani

Academic work
- Discipline: Natural history, zoology, geology, paleontology, botany
- Institutions: University of Bologna

Giovanni Giuseppe Bianconi, sometimes J. Josephi or Joseph Bianconi, (31 July 1809 in Bologna – 18 October 1878 in Bologna) was an Italian zoologist, herpetologist, botanist and geologist.

== Career ==
Bianconi succeeded his teacher Camillo Ranzani as professor of Natural History at the University of Bologna. In the field of herpetology he described several new species of amphibians and reptiles.

In 1874, Bianconi published a book on "independent creations", which utilized zoological arguments against Darwinism. The first edition was printed in French and contained a letter to Charles Darwin. The book sold well and Bianconi and his son Giovanni Antonio published a revised Italian edition in 1875. Bianconi argued that "enlightened application of laws of mechanics, physics, physiology" led to the conclusion that every part of an organism had been created by the "unlimited intelligence" of God.

Bianconi argued that homologous structures are explained on mechanical principles. Darwin discussed and rejected Bianconi's arguments in his The Descent of Man.

== Selected publications ==
- Sul sistema vascolare delle foglie considerato come carattere distintivo [sic] per la determinazione delle filliti, del Dottor Giuseppe Bianconi. Bologna, Marsigli. (1838)
- Storia naturale dei terreni ardenti, dei vulcani fangosi. Bologna. (1840)
- Specimina Zoologica Mosambicana, fasciculus IV, V. (Mollusca) Memorie della Accademia delle Scienze dell'Istituto di Bologna, volume 3, pages 3–18, 91-112, plate. (1850, 1851)
- Repertorio Italiano per la Storia Naturale. Zoologiam, Mineralogiam, Geolgiam, Palaentologiam. Bologna. (1854)
- La Theorie Darwinienne et la creation dite independante (1874). An "anti" Darwinist work claiming that homologous structures are explained on mechanical principles.

He published numerous papers, in both Italian and Latin, in the journal Novi Commentarii Academiae Scientiarum Instituti Bononiensis (beginning in 1844) and its successor Memorie della Accademia delle Scienze dell'Istituto di Bologna (from 1850 onward).

== See also ==
- Category:Taxa named by Giovanni Giuseppe Bianconi
- List of herpetologists

== Bibliography ==
- Sarjeant, William A. S. 1980-96. Geologists and the History of Geology: An International Bibliography. 10 vols. including supplements. London: Macmillan. Florida: Krieger Publishing.
- Spada Sermonti, Isabella (1968). "Bianconi, Giovanni Giuseppe". Dizionario Biografico degli Italiani (in Italian). Vol. 10: Biagio–Boccaccio. Rome: Istituto dell'Enciclopedia Italiana. ISBN 978-88-12-00032-6.
