= Ranularia gallinago =

Scientific classification
- Kingdom: Animalia
- Phylum: Mollusca
- Class: Gastropoda
- Subclass: Caenogastropoda
- Order: Littorinimorpha
- Family: Cymatiidae
- Genus: Ranularia
- Species: R. gallinago

Binomial name
- Ranularia gallinago (Reeve, 1844)

Synonyms
- Cymatium (Ranularia) mohorterae A.H. Verrill, 1952; Cymatium aegrotum (Reeve, 1844); Cymatium gallinago (Reeve, 1844); Triton aegrotus Reeve, 1844; Triton gallinago Reeve, 1844; Lotorium galingo Rye

Species of gastropod

Ranularia gallinago is a species of predatory sea snail, a marine gastropod mollusk in the family Cymatiidae.

== Distribution ==
This species occurs in the Indian Ocean off the Mascarene Basin.
