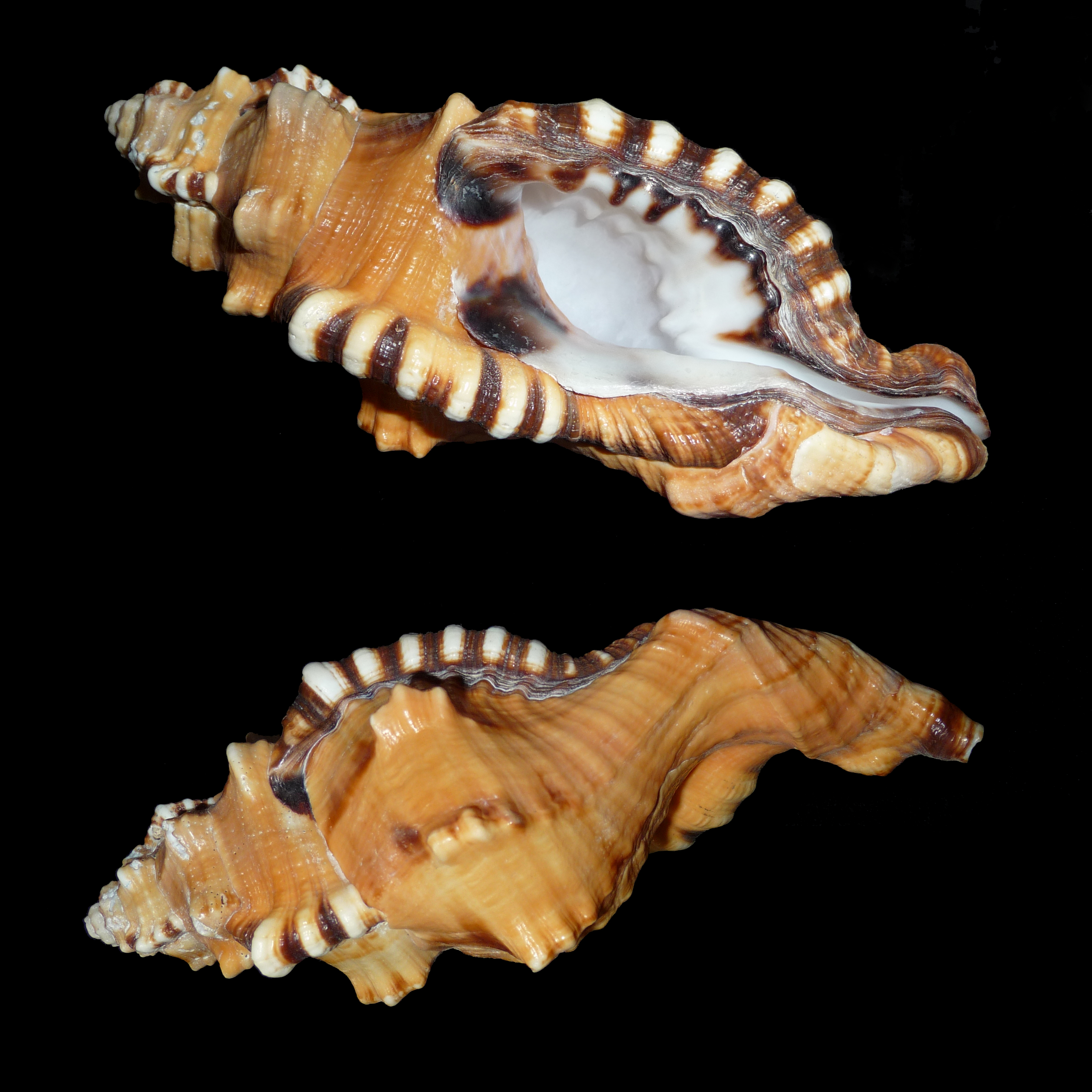
- A shell of Lotoria lotoria with the periostracum removed

Scientific classification
- Kingdom: Animalia
- Phylum: Mollusca
- Class: Gastropoda
- Subclass: Caenogastropoda
- Order: Littorinimorpha
- Family: Cymatiidae
- Genus: Lotoria
- Species: L. lotoria

Binomial name
- Lotoria lotoria (Linnaeus, 1758)

Synonyms
- Cymatium (Lotoria) lotorium (Linnaeus, 1758); Cymatium lotorium (Linnaeus, 1758); Cymatium rhinoceros P.F. Röding, 1798; Murex lotorium Linnaeus, 1758; Triton distortum Lamarck, 1816

= Lotoria lotoria =

Lotoria lotoria Temporal range: Eocene - Recent

Species of gastropod

Lotoria lotoria, the black-spotted snail or washing bath triton, is a species of predatory sea snail, a tropical marine gastropod mollusc in the family Cymatiidae. This species was previously known as Cymatium lotorium.

== Fossil records ==
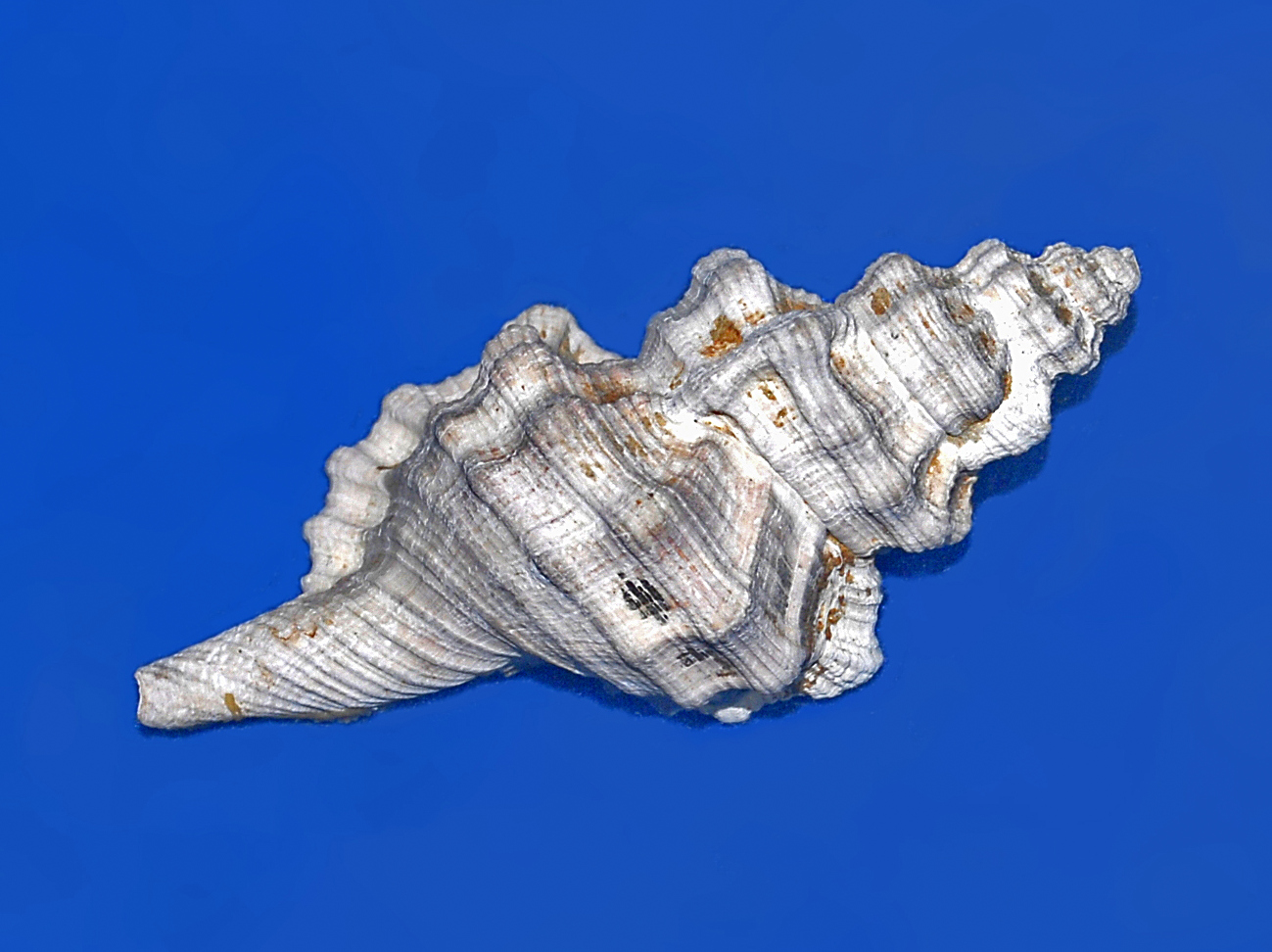
Fossil shell of Lotoria lotoria from Pliocene of Italy

Fossils from this family date back to the Eocene (age range: from 55.8 to 0.012 million years ago).

== Description ==
Shells of Lotoria lotoria can reach a size of 90–160 millimetres (3.5–6.3 in).

The shell is somewhat fusiformly turreted, thick, solid, distorted at the lower part, with four or five varices. The spire is rude and rather obtuse. The whorls are angulated at the upper part, obsoletely depressly ribbed with the ribs crenulated. The shell is reddish yellow, ornamented above the aperture and upon the varices between the ribs with blackish brown. The columella is more or less obsoletely plaited. The outer lip is denticulated. The siphonal canal is short and broad.

== Distribution ==
This species of marine snail lives in the tropical Indo-Pacific oceans, the Philippines, Papua New Guinea, the Marquesas Islands and off Australia (Queensland)

== Habitat ==
Lotoria lotoria is quite common in coral reefs in Australia and the Indian Ocean.
