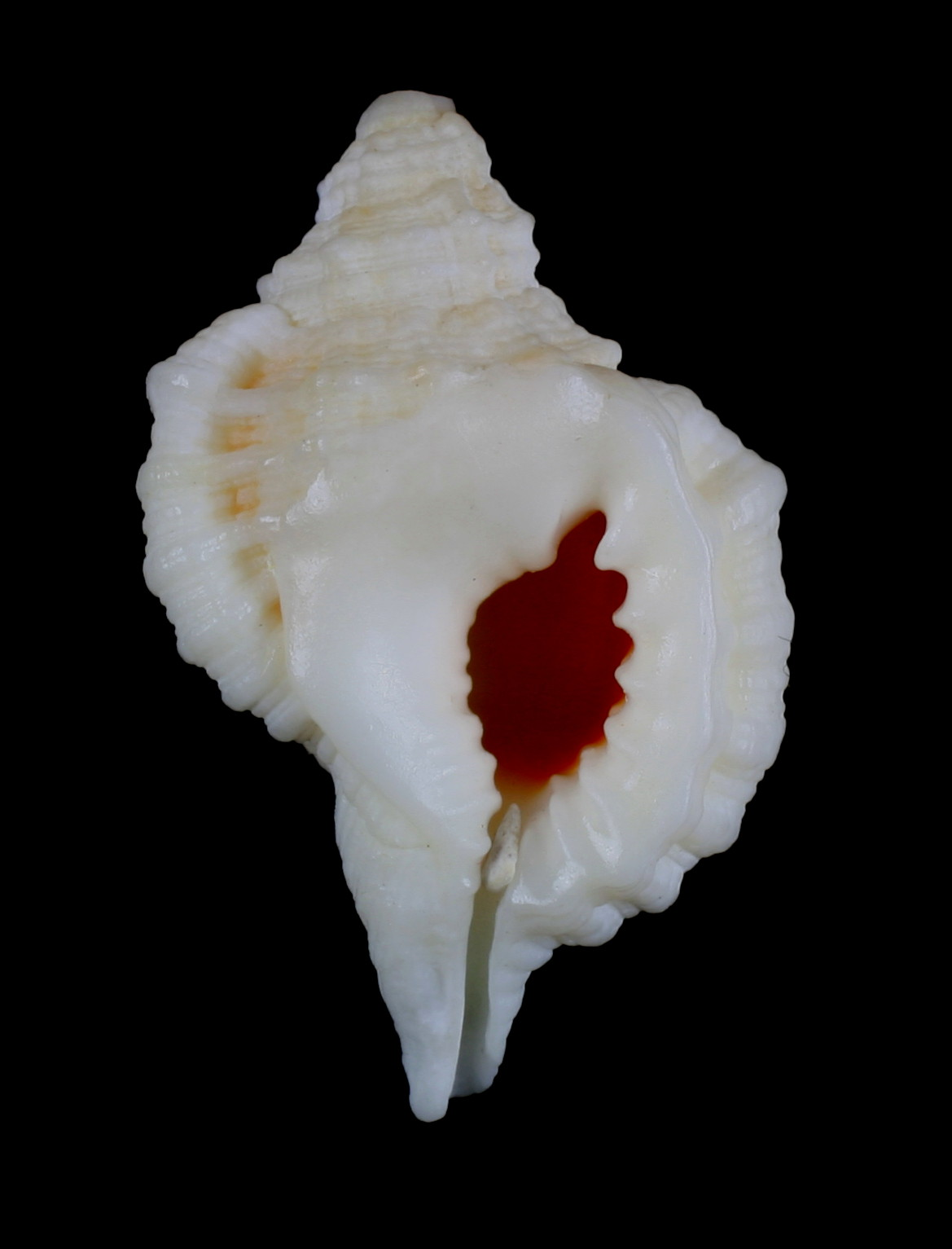
- Apertural view of Gutturnium muricinum

Scientific classification
- Kingdom: Animalia
- Phylum: Mollusca
- Class: Gastropoda
- Subclass: Caenogastropoda
- Order: Littorinimorpha
- Superfamily: Tonnoidea
- Family: Cymatiidae
- Genus: Gutturnium; Mørch, 1852

Type species
- Triton tuberosum Lamarck, 1822

Synonyms
- Afrocanidea Connolly, 1929; Cymatium (Gutturnium) Mörch, 1852; Triton (Gutturnium) Mörch, 1852

= Gutturnium =

Genus of gastropods

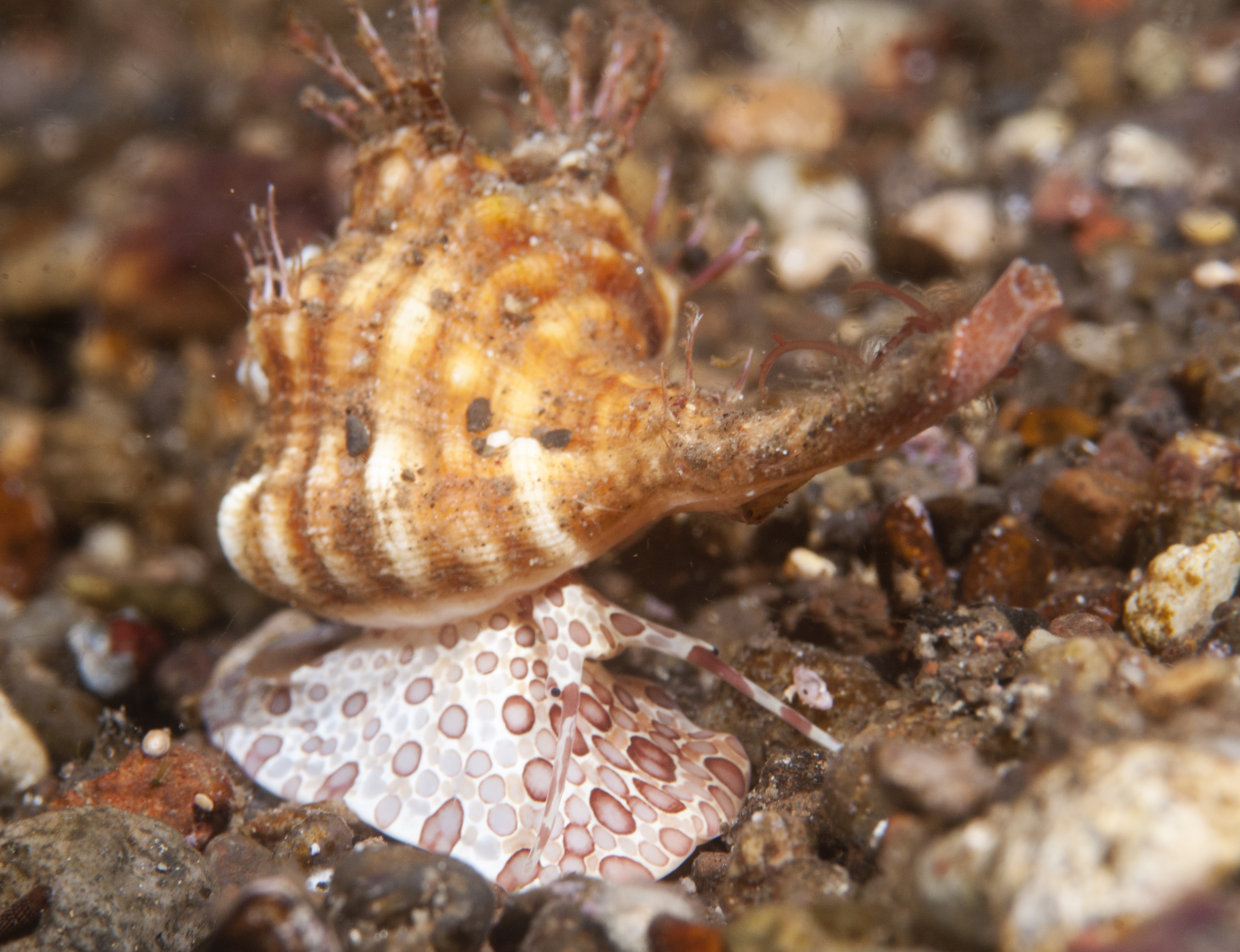
Cymatium (Gutternium) sp.

Gutturnium is a genus of predatory sea snails, marine gastropod mollusks in the family Cymatiidae.

== Species ==
The only species within the genus Gutturnium is:

- Gutturnium muricinum (Röding, 1798)

Species brought into synonymy

- Gutturnium gracile (Reeve, 1844): synonym of Reticutriton pfeifferianus (Reeve, 1844)
