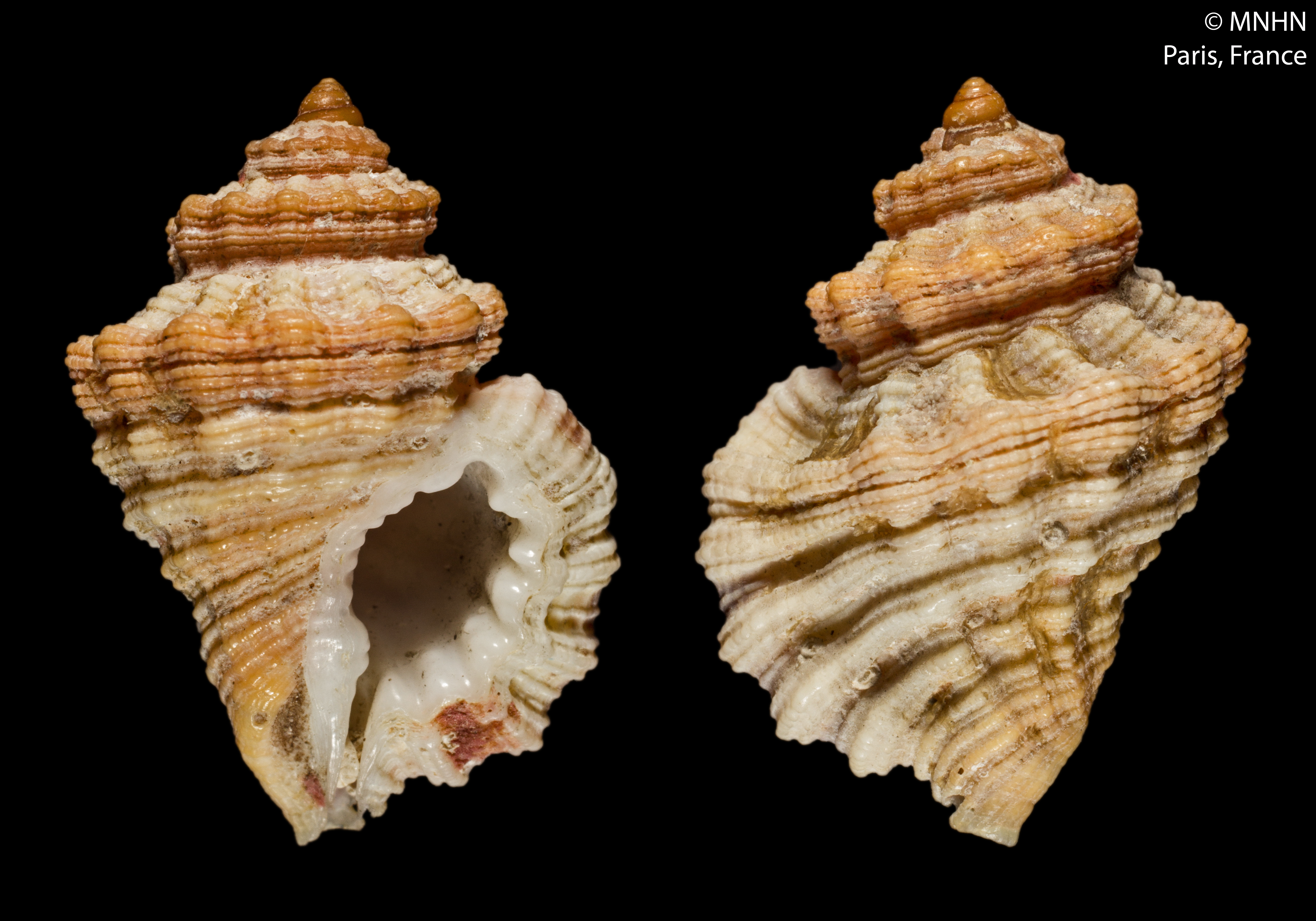
- Shell of Turritriton labiosus (syntype at MNHN, Paris)

Scientific classification
- Kingdom: Animalia
- Phylum: Mollusca
- Class: Gastropoda
- Subclass: Caenogastropoda
- Order: Littorinimorpha
- Superfamily: Tonnoidea
- Family: Cymatiidae
- Genus: Turritriton
- Species: T. labiosus

Binomial name
- Turritriton labiosus (W. Wood, 1828)

Synonyms
- Cabestana (Turritriton) labiosa (Wood, 1828); Cymatium (Cabestana) labiosum (Wood, 1828) · accepted, alternate representation; Cymatium labiosum (Wood, 1828); Murex labiosus Wood, 1828; Triton (Gutturnium) orientalis G. & H. Nevill, 1874; Triton loebbeckei Lischke, 1870; Triton loroisi Petit de la Saussaye, 1851; Triton loroisii Petit de la Saussaye, 1852; Triton orientale G. & H. Nevill, 1874; Triton strangei A. Adams & Angas, 1864; Tritonium rutilum Menke, 1843; Turritriton labiosa Beu, 1971

= Turritriton labiosus =

Species of gastropod

Turritriton labiosus, also known as Cymatium labiosum, is a species of predatory sea snail, a marine gastropod mollusc in the family Cymatiidae.

== Description ==
The maximum recorded shell length is 30 mm.

== Distribution ==
Atlantic Ocean: rare in the Canary Islands.

== Habitat ==
Coral sand bottom, sheltered lagoon environment.

The minimum recorded depth for this species is 0.2 m; the maximum recorded depth is 91 m.
