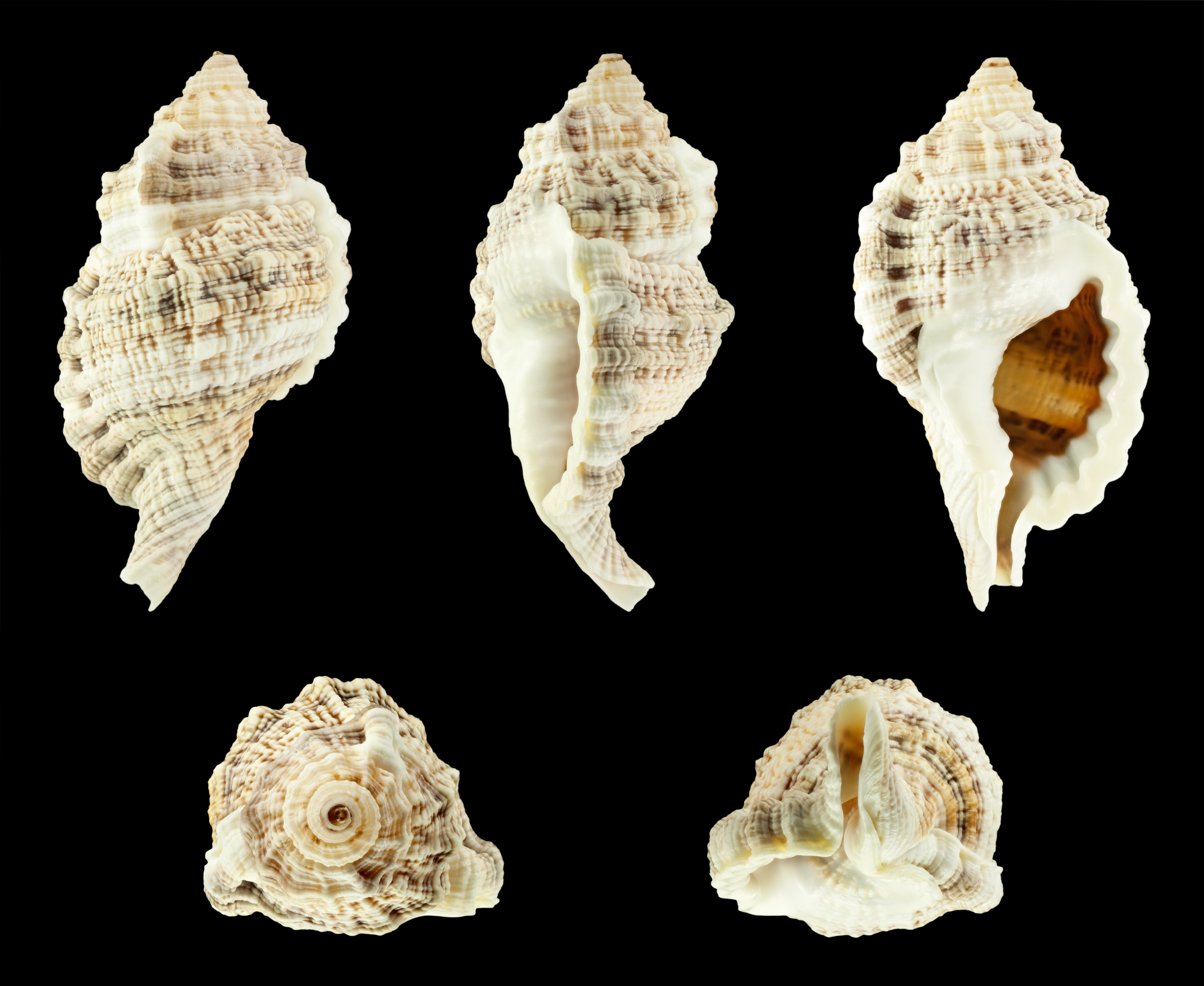
- Apertural view of Gutturnium muricinum (Röding, 1798)

Scientific classification
- Kingdom: Animalia
- Phylum: Mollusca
- Class: Gastropoda
- Subclass: Caenogastropoda
- Order: Littorinimorpha
- Family: Cymatiidae
- Genus: Gutturnium
- Species: G. muricinum

Binomial name
- Gutturnium muricinum (Röding, 1798)

Synonyms
- Afrocanidea gemma Connolly, 1929; Cymatium muricinum (Röding, 1798); Cymatium tuberosum (Lamarck, 1822); Distorsio muricinum Röding, 1798; Eutritonium tuberosum (Lamarck, 1822); Litiopa obesa C. B. Adams, 1850; Ranella gyrinata Risso, 1826; Ranularia muricina (Röding, 1798); Ranularia tuberosus (Lamarck, 1822); Triton albocingulatus Deshayes, 1863; Triton antillarum d'Orbigny, 1842; Triton crispus Reeve, 1844; Triton productum Gould, 1852; Triton pyriformis Conrad, 1849; Triton tuberosum Lamarck, 1822; Tritonium (Ranularia) nodulus Tapparone-Canefri, 1881; Tritonium nodulus Link, 1807

= Gutturnium muricinum =

Species of gastropod

Gutturnium muricinum, the knobbly triton, is a species of predatory sea snail, a marine gastropod mollusk in the family Cymatiidae.

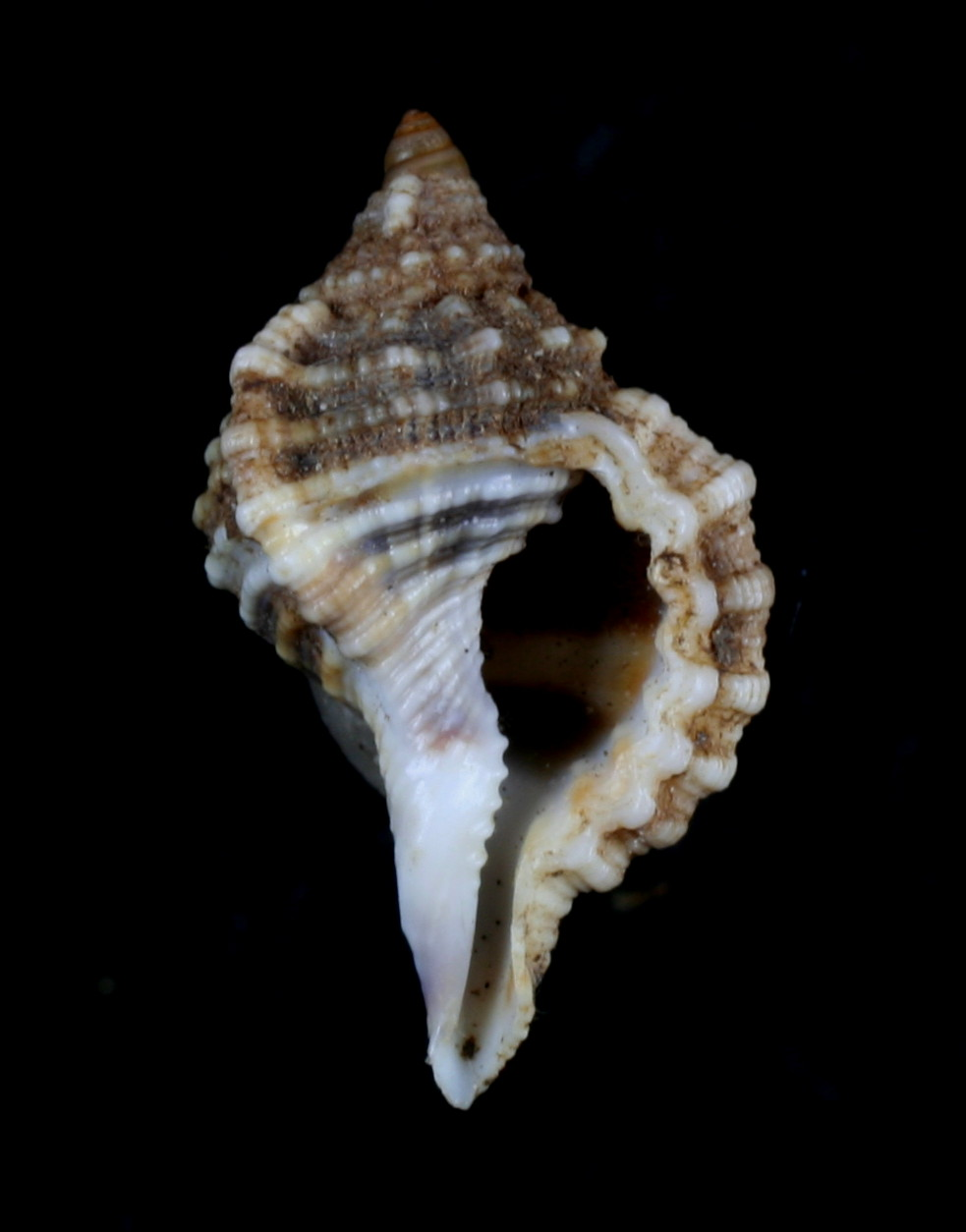
Apertural view of Gutturnium muricinum, a subadult specimen

== Description ==
The maximum recorded shell length is 75 mm.

== Habitat ==
The minimum recorded depth for this species is 0 m; the maximum recorded depth is 27 m.

== Distribution ==
This marine species occurs in the Indian Ocean off Réunion.
