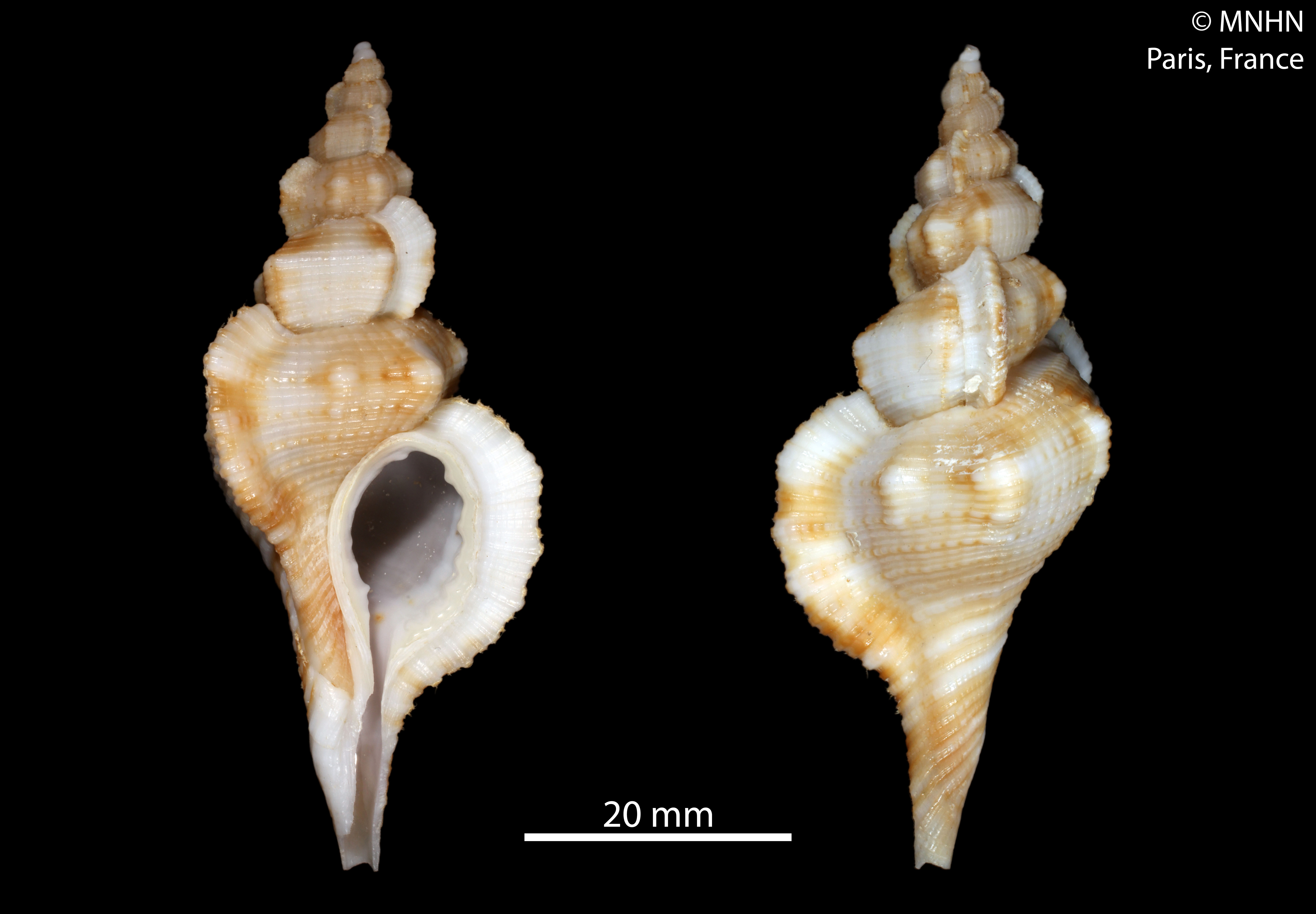
- Shell of Turritriton tenuiliratus (specimen at MNHN, Paris)

Scientific classification
- Kingdom: Animalia
- Phylum: Mollusca
- Class: Gastropoda
- Subclass: Caenogastropoda
- Order: Littorinimorpha
- Family: Cymatiidae
- Genus: Turritriton
- Species: T. tenuiliratus

Binomial name
- Turritriton tenuiliratus (Lischke, 1873)

Synonyms
- Cymatium (Monoplex) tenuiliratum (Lischke, 1873); Cymatium tenuiliratum (Lischke, 1873); Triton tenuiliratum Lischke, 1873; Triton tenuiliratus Lischke, 1873

= Turritriton tenuiliratus =

Species of gastropod

Turritriton tenuiliratus, the thin-lined triton, is a species of predatory sea snail, a marine gastropod mollusk in the family Cymatiidae.

== Description ==
The shell size varies between 30 mm and 60 mm.

== Distribution ==
This species has a wide distribution. It can be found in European waters, the Canary Islands, in the Gulf of Mexico, the Caribbean Sea, the Philippines, and Japan.
