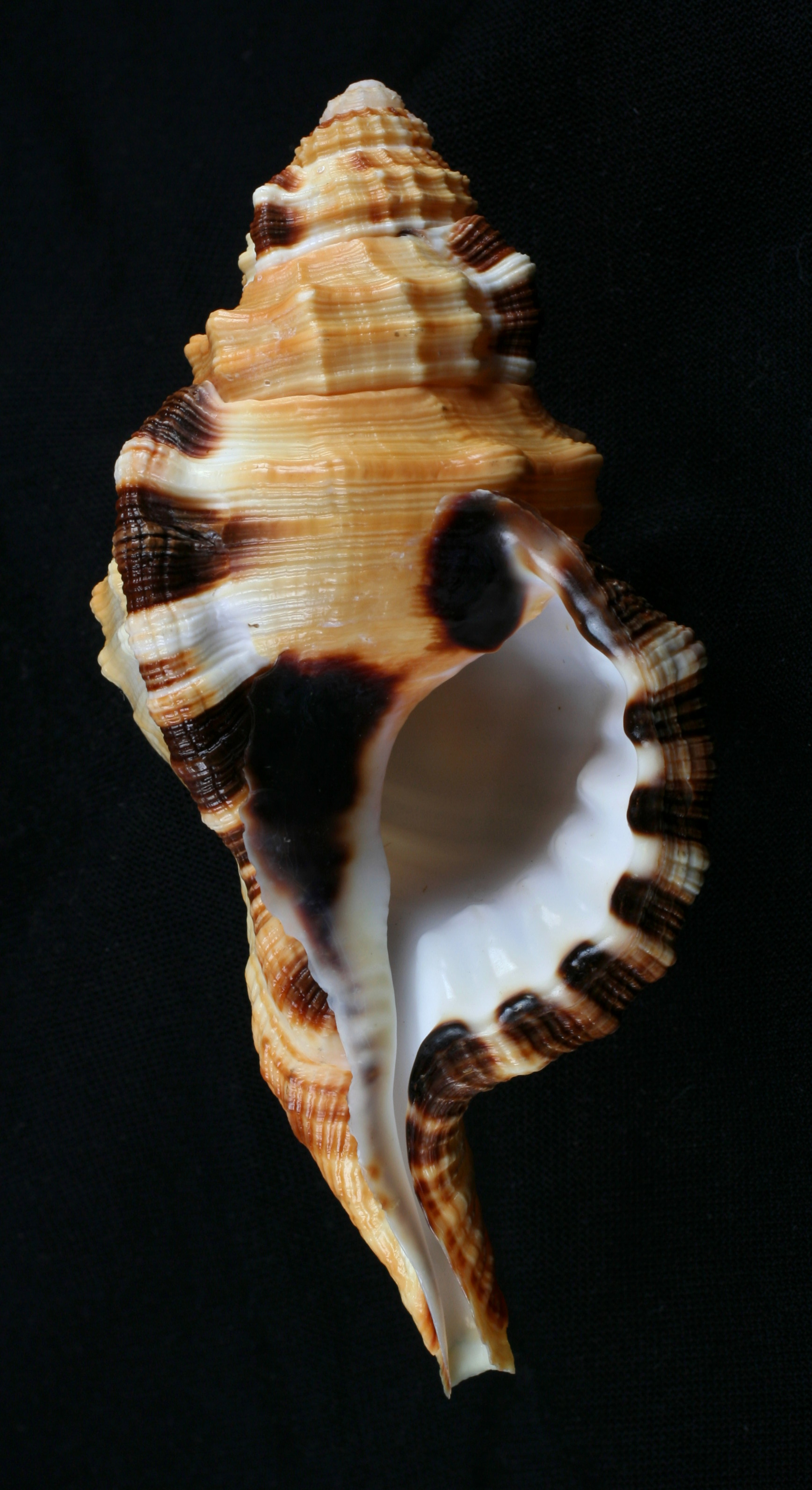
- Lotoria grandimaculata (Reeve, 1844)

Scientific classification
- Kingdom: Animalia
- Phylum: Mollusca
- Class: Gastropoda
- Subclass: Caenogastropoda
- Order: Littorinimorpha
- Family: Cymatiidae
- Genus: Lotoria
- Species: L. grandimaculata

Binomial name
- Lotoria grandimaculata (Reeve, 1844)

Synonyms
- Charonia grandimaculatus Reeve, 1844; Cymatium grandimaculatum (Reeve, 1844); Cymatium (Lotoria) grandimaculatsm (Reeve, L.A., 1844); Triton grandimaculatus Reeve, 1844 (basionym)

= Lotoria grandimaculata =

Species of gastropod

Lotoria grandimaculata, the large spotted triton, is a species of predatory sea snail, a marine gastropod mollusk in the family Cymatiidae.

== Description ==
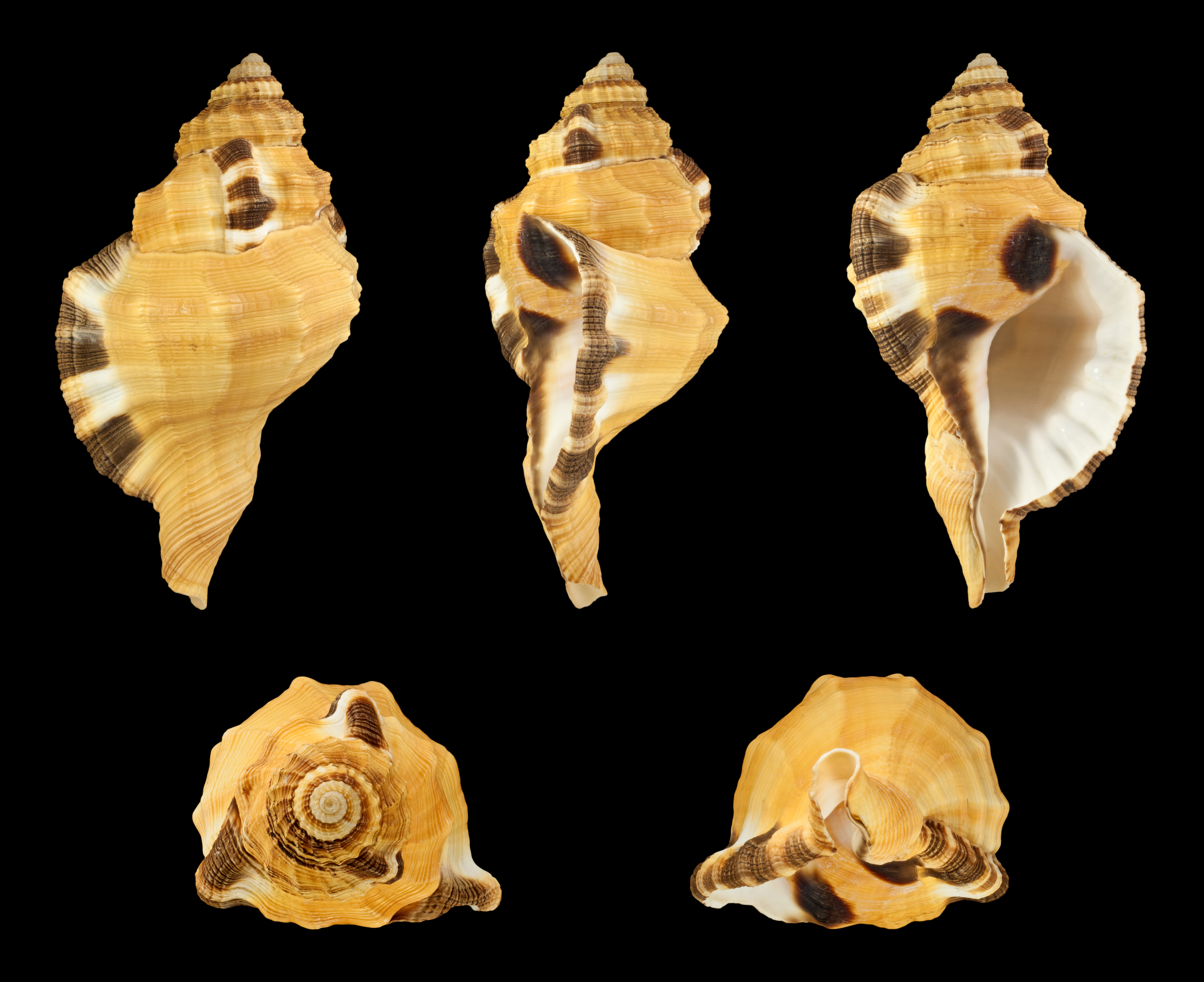

The shell size varies between 50 mm and 132 mm

The shell is ovately turreted, thick, contracted at the lower part, with three varices. The spire is rather obtuse. The whorls are angulated at the upper part, transversely faintly striated and ridged. The upper ridges are tubercularly knobbed. The shell is light brownish yellow. The varices and the upper part of the columella are ornamented with large spots of very dark brown. The columella is smooth or obsoletely plaited. The outer lip is dentated within, teeth very dark brown. The interior of the aperture is white. The siphonal canal is rather short, a little turned upwards.

== Distribution ==
This species occurs in the Red Sea and in the Indian Ocean off East Africa; also off the Philippines.
