= Monoplex exaratus =

Scientific classification
- Kingdom: Animalia
- Phylum: Mollusca
- Class: Gastropoda
- Subclass: Caenogastropoda
- Order: Littorinimorpha
- Family: Cymatiidae
- Genus: Monoplex
- Species: M. exaratus

Binomial name
- Monoplex exaratus (Reeve, 1844)

Synonyms
- Cabestanimorpha euclia Cotton, 1945; Cymatium exaratum (Reeve, 1844); Cymatium zimara Iredale, 1929; Lotorium (Cymatium) kiiense G.B. Sowerby III, 1915; Monoplex cornutus Perry, 1811; Triton exaratus Reeve, 1844; Triton obscurus A. Adams, 1855; Tritonium granulatum Dunker, 1871

Species of gastropod

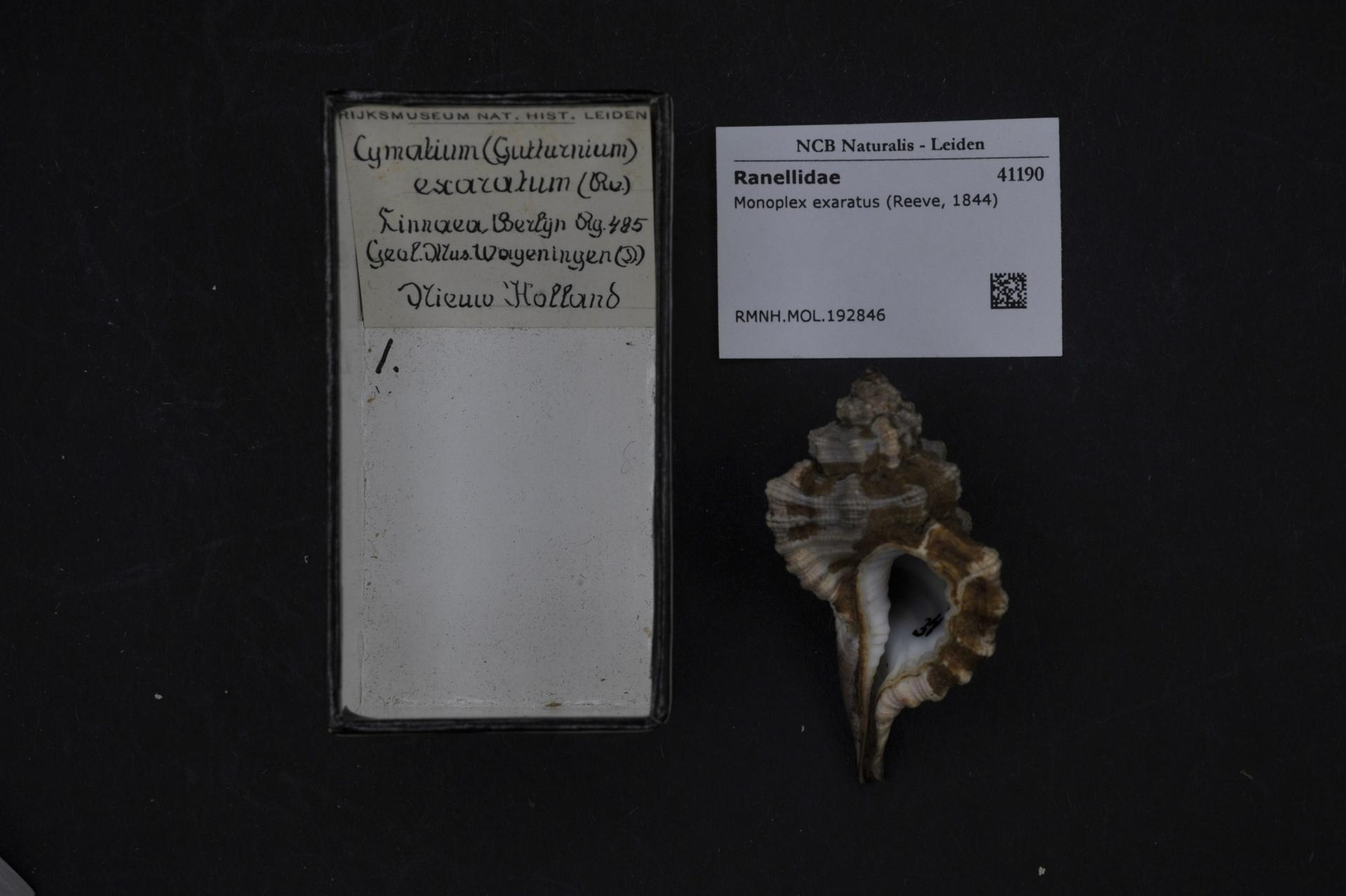

Monoplex exaratus is a species of predatory sea snail, a marine gastropod mollusk in the family Cymatiidae.

== Distribution ==
According to the World Register of Marine Species, Monoplex exaratus is found near Australia, Japan, the Hawaiian Islands, the Red Sea, and South Africa. Sightings have been noted in Senegal and Caribbean Sea, but their veracity as evidence for distribution is doubtful.
