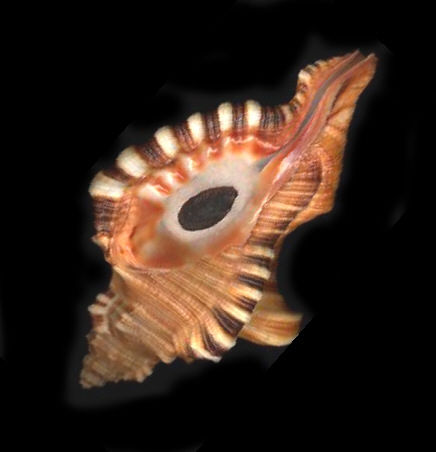
- A shell of Lotoria triangularis without the periostracum but with the operculum glued onto cotton in the aperture. Anterior end to the upper right
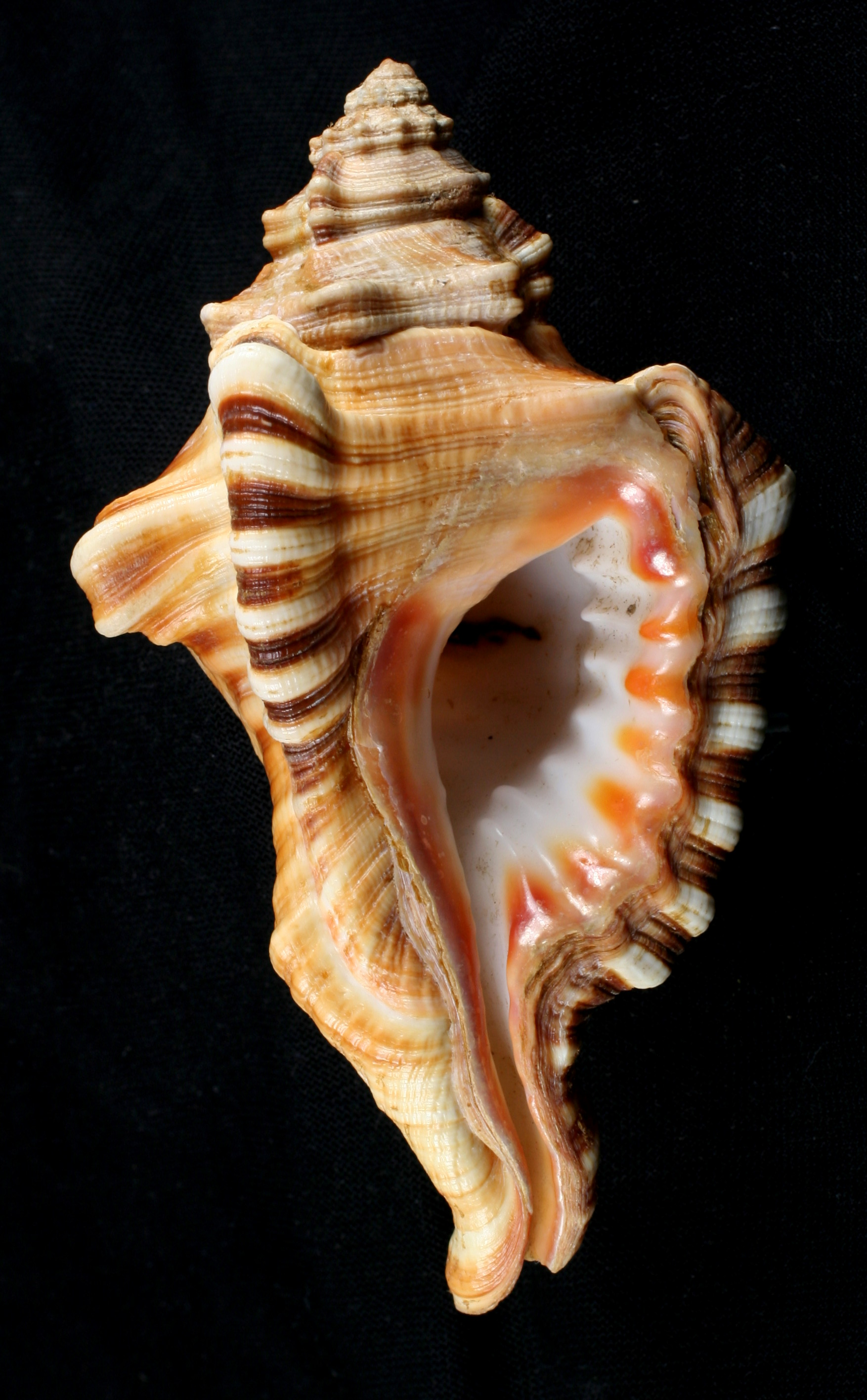
- Apertural view of Lotoria triangularis

Scientific classification
- Kingdom: Animalia
- Phylum: Mollusca
- Class: Gastropoda
- Subclass: Caenogastropoda
- Order: Littorinimorpha
- Superfamily: Tonnoidea
- Family: Cymatiidae
- Genus: Lotoria
- Species: L. triangularis

Binomial name
- Lotoria triangularis (Emerson & Old, 1963)

Synonyms
- Cymatium (Lotoria) perryi Emerson & Old, 1963; Lotoria perryi (W. K. Emerson & Old, 1963); Septa triangularis Perry, 1811

= Lotoria triangularis =

Species of gastropod

Lotoria triangularis is a species of predatory sea snail, a marine gastropod mollusk in the family Cymatiidae. shell of Lotoria triangularis is robust and can reach a maximum length of 142 mm. the shell features a turreted, fusiform shape with prominent varices. The whorls are typically triangular in cross-section—a feature that gives the species its name—and are often coronated with blunt tubercles or spines.

The aperture is notably longer than the spire, with an outer lip that is heavily dentated internally. In its natural state, the shell is covered by a periostracum, a fibrous, hair-like outer layer that protects the calcium carbonate shell from erosion.

== Description ==
The length of the shell attains 142 mm.

== Distribution ==
This species of marine snail occurs in the Indo-Pacific ocean, mainly off India, Sri Lanka and in the Andaman Sea.
