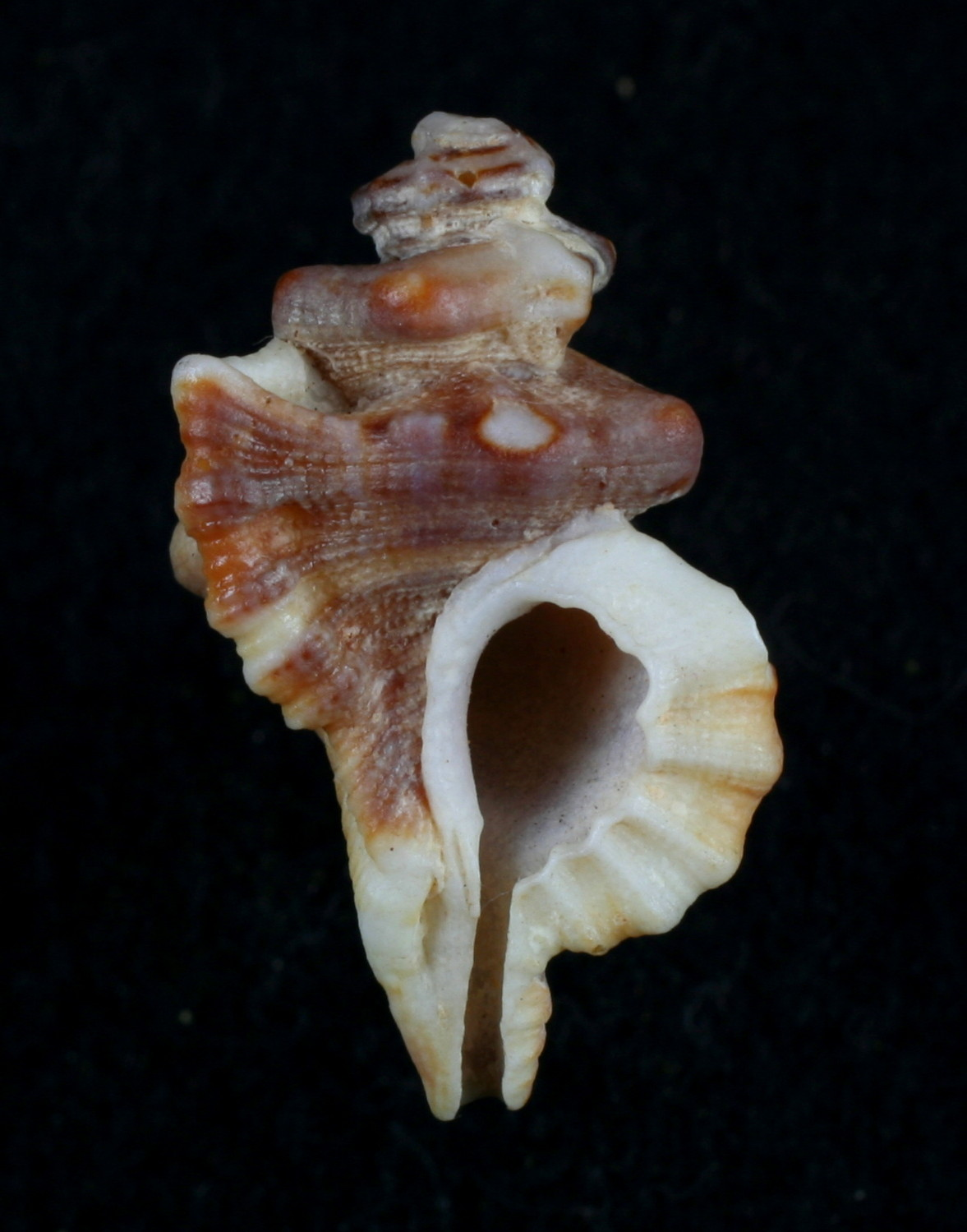
- Apertural view

Scientific classification
- Kingdom: Animalia
- Phylum: Mollusca
- Class: Gastropoda
- Subclass: Caenogastropoda
- Order: Littorinimorpha
- Superfamily: Tonnoidea
- Family: Cymatiidae
- Genus: Turritriton
- Species: T. gibbosus

Binomial name
- Turritriton gibbosus (Broderip, 1833)

Synonyms
- Cymatium (Turritriton) gibbosum (Broderip, 1833); Cymatium (Turritriton) gibbosum gomezi F. Nordsieck & García-Talavera, 1979; Cymatium adairense Dall, 1910; Cymatium gibbosum (Broderip, 1833); Cymatium gibbosum gibbosum (Broderip, 1833); Cymatium gibbosum gomezi F. Nordsieck & García-Talavera, 1979; Cymatium gibbosum kobelti (Maltzan, 1884); Triton gibbosus Broderip, 1833 (original combination); Tritonium kobelti Maltzan, 1884

= Turritriton gibbosus =

Species of sea snail

Turritriton gibbosus is a species of predatory sea snail, a marine gastropod mollusk in the family Cymatiidae.

== Description ==
(Described as Cymatium adairense) The length of the shell measures 33 mm. It contains four glassy, smooth nepionic whorls and four and a half subsequent whorls. The color of the shell is pale brownish, somewhat darker on the prominences. The sculpture consists of about two varices to a whorl, less on the earlier whorls. On the last two whorls the lines joining the varices are nearly at right angles to each other. The portion of the whorls behind the periphery is flattened, thus making the periphery very prominent. Upon it between each pair of varices are three prominent nodules. At the corresponding point on the varices is a conspicuous angle, almost a spine, but the remainder of the varical edge is rounded or crenate by the spiral sculpture. The only other axial sculpture is the sharp sulci which cut the spirals. These spirals are numerous, close set, flat, strap-like cords, separated by narrower, sharp grooves and crossed by many subequally spaced sharp axial sulci. These cut the flat surface of the spirals into minute scale-like segments, but where the spirals cross the varices, the interspaces widen. The siphonal canal is rather long, recurved, open. The aperture is rounded and measures 8 mm. It has a nearly entire, projecting peritreme, smooth on the inner lip, with four or five shallow grooves on the inside of the outer lip. The species attains a size of 55 mm.

== Distribution ==
This species occurs in the Sea of Cortez, Mexico; off Panama, Costa Rica, Ecuador.
