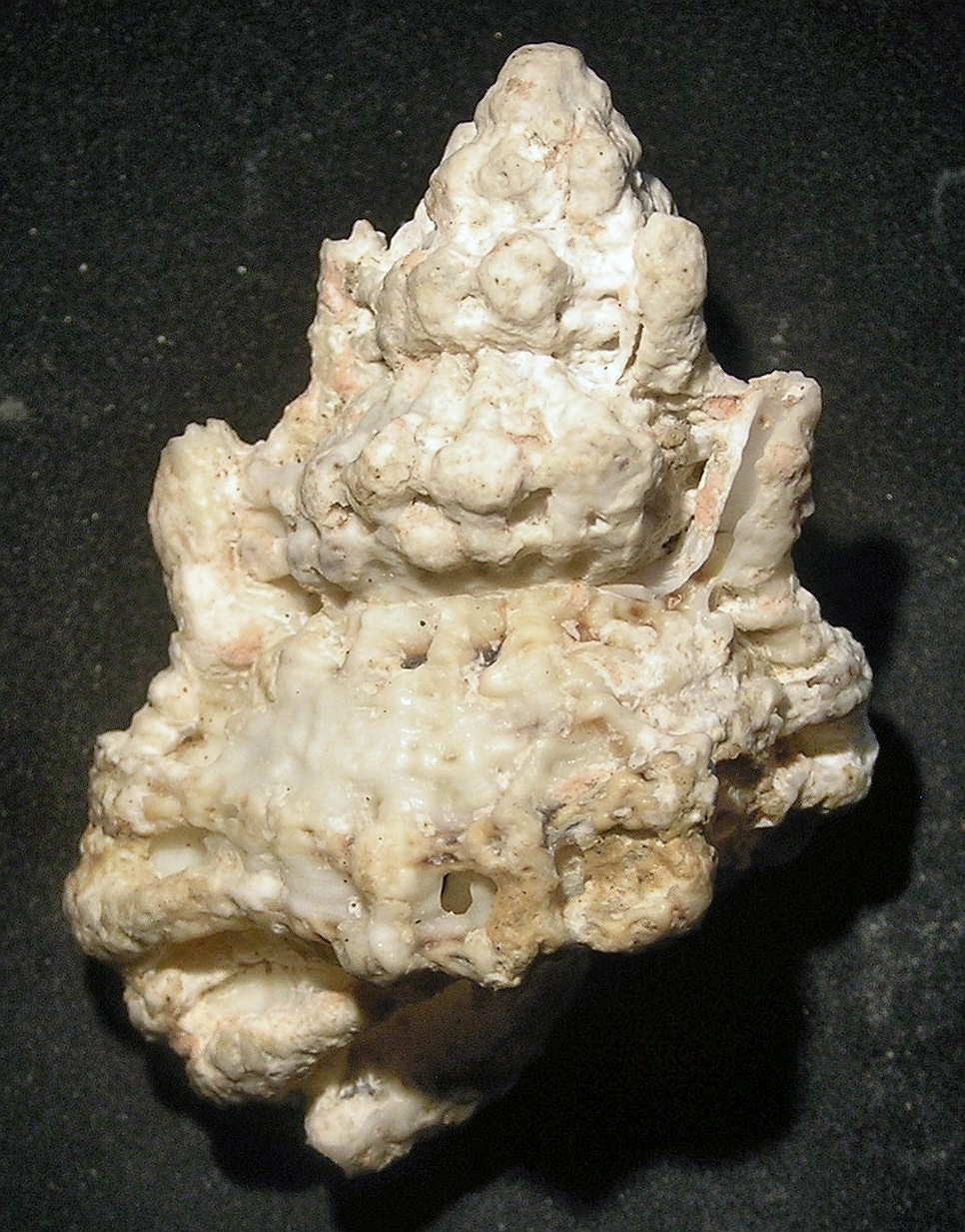
- Bursa tuberosissima, abapertural view

Scientific classification
- Kingdom: Animalia
- Phylum: Mollusca
- Class: Gastropoda
- Subclass: Caenogastropoda
- Order: Littorinimorpha
- Superfamily: Tonnoidea
- Family: Bursidae
- Genus: Bursa; Röding, 1798

Type species
- Bursa monitata Röding, 1798

Species
- See text.

Synonyms
- Bursa (Bursa) Röding, 1798; Bursa (Colubrellina) P. Fischer, 1884; Bursa (Lampadopsis) P. Fischer, 1884; Colubrellina Fischer, 1884; Columbraria ·(incorrect subsequent spelling of Colubrellina); Lampadopsis Fischer, 1884 (Justified emendation of Lampasopsis Jousseaume, 1881); Pseudobursa Rovereto, 1899 (Unnecessary replacement name for Bursa Röding, 1798)

= Bursa (gastropod) =

Genus of gastropods

Bursa is a genus of large sea snails, marine gastropod molluscs in the family Bursidae, the frog snails or frog shells.

== Description ==
The ovate or oblong shell is compressed, and shows two rows of continuous varices, one on each side. The aperture is ova. The columella is arcuated, and ridged or crenulated. The siphonal canal is short and recurved. The outer lip is crenated.

The species of Bursa are mostly tropical, the majority being from the Eastern seas. They are found, when variegated and with nodose armature, in rocky places and on coral reefs. The winged species, with a smoother surface, are from deep water. They move about with considerable animation, and crawl rapidly.

== Recognized species ==
Species within the genus Bursa include:

- Bursa asperrima Dunker, 1862
- Bursa bufonia (Gmelin, 1791)
- Bursa calcipicta Dall, 1908
- Bursa davidboschi Beu, 1987
- Bursa grayana Dunker, 1862 - elegant frogsnail
- Bursa humilis Beu, 1981
- Bursa lamarckii (G. P. Deshayes, 1853)
- Bursa leo Shikama, 1964
- Bursa luteostoma W. H. Pease, 1861
- Bursa natalensis Matthews & Coelho, 1970
- † Bursa nodosa (Borson, 1825)
- Bursa rosa Perry, 1811
- Bursa rugosa G.B. Sowerby II, 1835
- † Bursa sangirana Beu, 2005
- † Bursa transeuntis Forli & Smriglio, 2021
- Bursa tuberosissima L. A. Reeve, 1844

== Species brought into synonymy ==
- Bursa affinis (Broderip, W.J., 1832): synonym of Dulcerana affinis (Broderip, 1833)
- Bursa alfredensis Turton, 1932: synonym of Dulcerana alfredensis (W. H. Turton, 1932) (original combination)
- Bursa angioyorum Parth, 1990: synonym of Bursa lamarckii (Deshayes, 1853)
- Bursa awatii Ray, 1949 : synonym of Korrigania awatii (Ray, 1948) (original combination)
- Bursa barcellosi Matthews, Rios & Coelho, 1973: synonym of Ranella olearium (Linnaeus, 1758)
- Bursa bergeri C. E. Tapparone-Canefri, 1880 : synonym of Bursa rhodostoma (Sowerby II, 1835)
- Bursa bubo Linnaeus: synonym of Tutufa bubo (Linnaeus, 1758) represented as Tutufa (Tutufa) bubo (Linnaeus, 1758)
- Bursa bubo lissostoma E. A. Smith, 1914: synonym of Tutufa bubo (Linnaeus, 1758) represented as Tutufa (Tutufa) bubo (Linnaeus, 1758)
- Bursa bufonia dunkeri Kira, 1959 : synonym of Bursa bufonia Kira, 1959
- Bursa bufo (Bruguiere, 1792): spelling of Bursa bubo in Spry 1961
- Bursa caelata W. J. Broderip, 1833 : synonym of Bursa corrugata (Perry, 1811)
- Bursa calcipicta Dall, 1908: synonym of Bursa rugosa (G.B. Sowerby II, 1835)
- Bursa californica (Hinds, 1843): synonym of Crossata ventricosa (Broderip, 1833)
- Bursa concinna Dunker, 1862: synonym of Gyrineum concinnum (Dunker, 1862)
- Bursa condita J. F. Gmelin, 1791 : synonym of Colubrellina condita (Gmelin, 1791)
- Bursa corrugata Perry, 1811 - gaudy frogsnail: synonym of Alanbeuella corrugata (Perry, 1811)
- Bursa cruentata G.B. Sowerby II, 1835 : synonym of Lampasopsis cruentata (G. B. Sowerby II, 1835)
- Bursa corrugata ponderosa L. A. Reeve, 1844: synonym of Ranella ponderosa Reeve, 1844, in turn, synonym of Bursa corrugata Perry, 1811
- Bursa corrugata pustulosa L. A. Reeve, 1844: synonym of Bursa corrugata Perry, 1811
- Bursa crassa (Dillwyn, 1817): synonym of Marsupina bufo (Bruguière, 1792)
- Bursa crumena (Lamarck, 1816): synonym of Bufonaria crumena (Lamarck, 1816)
- Bursa crumenoides Valenciennes, 1832 : synonym of Bufo crumena (Lamarck, 1816)
- Bursa cubaniana (d'Orbigny, 1841): synonym of Dulcerana cubaniana (d'Orbigny, 1847)
- Bursa cumingiana Dunker, 1862: synonym of Bursa granularis (Röding, 1798): synonym of Dulcerana granularis (Röding, 1798) (junior synonym)
- Bursa dunkeri Kira, 1962 : synonym of Bursa bufonia (Gmelin, 1791)
- Bursa echinata (Link, 1807): synonym of Bufonaria echinata (Link, 1807)
- Bursa elisabettae Nappo, Pellegrini & Bonomolo, 2014: synonym of Dulcerana elisabettae (Nappo, Pellegrini & Bonomolo, 2014)
- Bursa fijiensis R. B. Watson, 1881 : synonym of Bursina fijiensis (Watson, 1881)
- Bursa finlayi Mcginty, 1962: synonym of Bursa (Bufonariella) ranelloides (Reeve, 1844)
- Bursa fosteri Beu, 1987: synonym of Korrigania fosteri (Beu, 1987)
- Bursa fuscocostata Dunker, 1862: synonym of Gyrineum bituberculare (Lamarck, 1816)
- Bursa gibbosa Röding, 1798: synonym of Marsupina bufo (Bruguière, 1792)
- Bursa gnorima Melvill, 1918: synonym of Bursina gnorima (Melvilll, 1918)
- Bursa granifera Röding: synonym of Bursa granularis (Röding, 1798) accepted as Dulcerana granularis (Röding, 1798)
- Bursa granularis Röding, 1798 - Cuba frogsnail: synonym of Dulcerana granularis (Röding, 1798) (original combination)
- Bursa kowiensis Turton, 1932: synonym of Bursa granularis (Röding, 1798)
- Bursa lamarkii (Deshayes, 1853): synonym of Bursa lamarckii (Deshayes, 1853)
- Bursa lamellosa Dunker, 1863: synonym of Aspella producta (Pease, 1861)
- Bursa lampas C. Linnaeus, 1758 : synonym of Tutufa bubo (Linnaeus, 1758) represented as Tutufa (Tutufa) bubo (Linnaeus, 1758)
- Bursa latitudo Garrard, 1961: synonym of Tritonoranella latitudo (Garrard, 1961)
- Bursa lissostoma E. A. Smith, 1914 : synonym of Tutufa bufo (Röding, P.F., 1798)
- Bursa livida L. A. Reeve, 1844 : synonym of Bursa granularis (Röding, 1798)
- Bursa lucaensis Parth, 1991 : synonym of Lampasopsis lucaensis (Parth, 1991) (original combination)
- Bursa mammata P. F. Röding, 1798 : synonym of Bursa bufonia (Gmelin, 1791)
- Bursa marginata (Gmelin, 1791): synonym of Aspa marginata (Gmelin, 1791)
- Bursa monitata P. F. Röding, 1798 : synonym of Bursa bufonia (Gmelin, 1791)
- Bursa muehlhaeusseri Parth, 1990 : synonym of Bursa lamarckii (Deshayes, 1853)
- Bursa nigrita Mulhauser & Blocher, 1979: synonym of Tutufa nigrita Mühlhäusser & Blöcher, 1979 represented as Tutufa (Tutufella) nigrita Mühlhäusser & Blöcher, 1979
- Bursa nobilis (Reeve, 1844): synonym of Bursina nobilis (Reeve, 1844)
- Bursa pacamoni Matthews & Coelho, 1971 : synonym of Bursa grayana Dunker, 1862
- Bursa pustulosa L. A. Reeve, 1844 ; synonym of Bursa corrugata (Perry, 1811)
- Bursa pygmaea S. Kosuge, 1979 : synonym of Bursa (Bufonariella) ranelloides (Reeve, 1844)
- Bursa quirihorai Beu, 1987 : synonym of Korrigania quirihorai (Beu, 1987) (basionym)
- Bursa ranelloides (Reeve, 1844) - fine-sculpted frogsnail: synonym of Tritonoranella ranelloides (Reeve, 1844)
- Bursa rhodostoma (G. B. Sowerby I or II, 1835) - wine-mouth frog shell: synonym of Lampasopsis rhodostoma (G. B. Sowerby II, 1835)
  - Bursa rhodostoma thomae d'Orbigny, 1842 - St. Thomas frog shell: synonym of Lampasopsis thomae (d'Orbigny, 1847)
- Bursa rubeta (Linnaeus, 1758): synonym of Tutufa (Tutufella) rubeta (Linnaeus, 1758)
- Bursa (Tutufa) rubeta var. gigantea Smith, 1914: synonym of Tutufa (Tutufa) bardeyi (Jousseaume, 1881)
- Bursa scrobilator Linnaeus, 1758: synonym of Talisman scrobilator (Linnaeus, 1758)
  - Bursa scrobilator coriaceum L. A. Reeve, 1844 : synonym of Talisman scrobilator coriaceum (Reeve, 1844)
- Bursa semigranosa J. B. Lamarck, 1822 : synonym of Bursa granularis (Röding, P.F., 1798)
- Bursa spinosa J. B. Lamarck, 1816 : synonym of Bufonaria echinata (Link, 1807)
- Bursa suensonii Mörch, 1853: synonym of Bufonaria echinata (Link, 1807)
- Bursa tenuisculpta (Dautzenberg and Fischer, 1906): synonym of Bursa ranelloides tenuisculpta Dautzenberg & Fischer, 1906
- Bursa thomae (d'Orbigny, 1842): synonym of Bursa rhodostoma (G. B. Sowerby I or II, 1835): synonym of Lampasopsis thomae (d'Orbigny, 1847)
- Bursa tumida Dunker, 1862: synonym of Argobuccinum tumidum (Dunker, 1862)
- Bursa venustula (Reeve, 1844): synonym of Bursa rhodostoma (G.B. Sowerby II, 1835)
- Bursa verrucosa (G. B. Sowerby I, 1825): synonym of Annaperenna verrucosa (G. B. Sowerby I, 1825)
