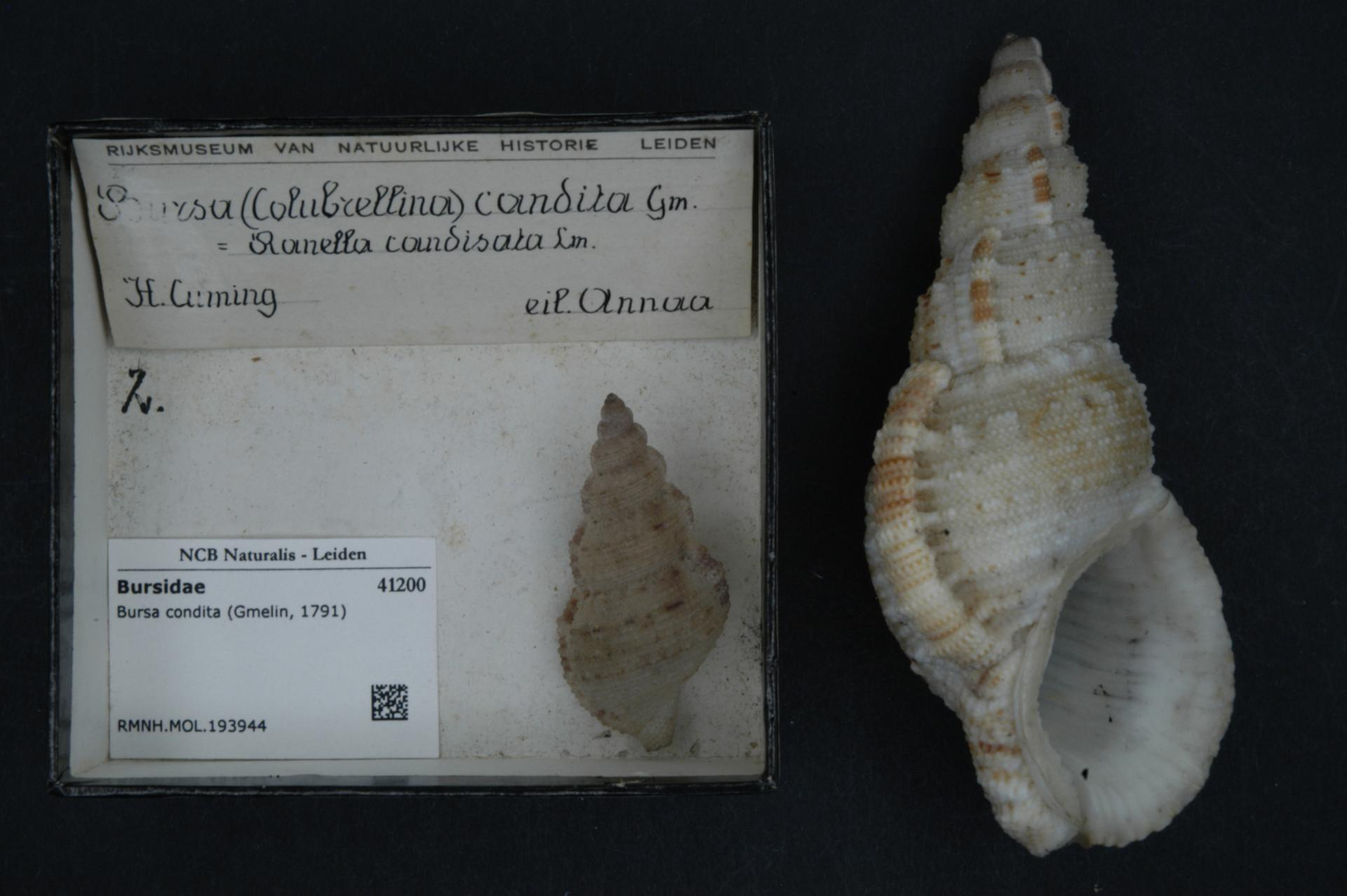
- Shell of Colubrellina condita (specimen at Naturalis Biodiversity Center)

Scientific classification
- Kingdom: Animalia
- Phylum: Mollusca
- Class: Gastropoda
- Subclass: Caenogastropoda
- Order: Littorinimorpha
- Superfamily: Tonnoidea
- Family: Bursidae
- Genus: Colubrellina; P. Fischer, 1884

Type species
- Tritonium candisatum Röding, 1798

Synonyms
- Ranella (Colubrellina) P. Fischer, 1884

= Colubrellina =

Genus of gastropods

Colubrellina is a genus of sea snails, marine gastropod mollusks in the family Bursidae, the frog shells.

== Species ==
- Colubrellina condita (Gmelin, 1791)

Synonyms

- Colubrellina (Dulcerana) Oyama, 1964: synonym of Dulcerana Oyama, 1964 (original rank)
- Colubrellina granularis (Röding, 1798): synonym of Dulcerana granularis (Röding, 1798)
