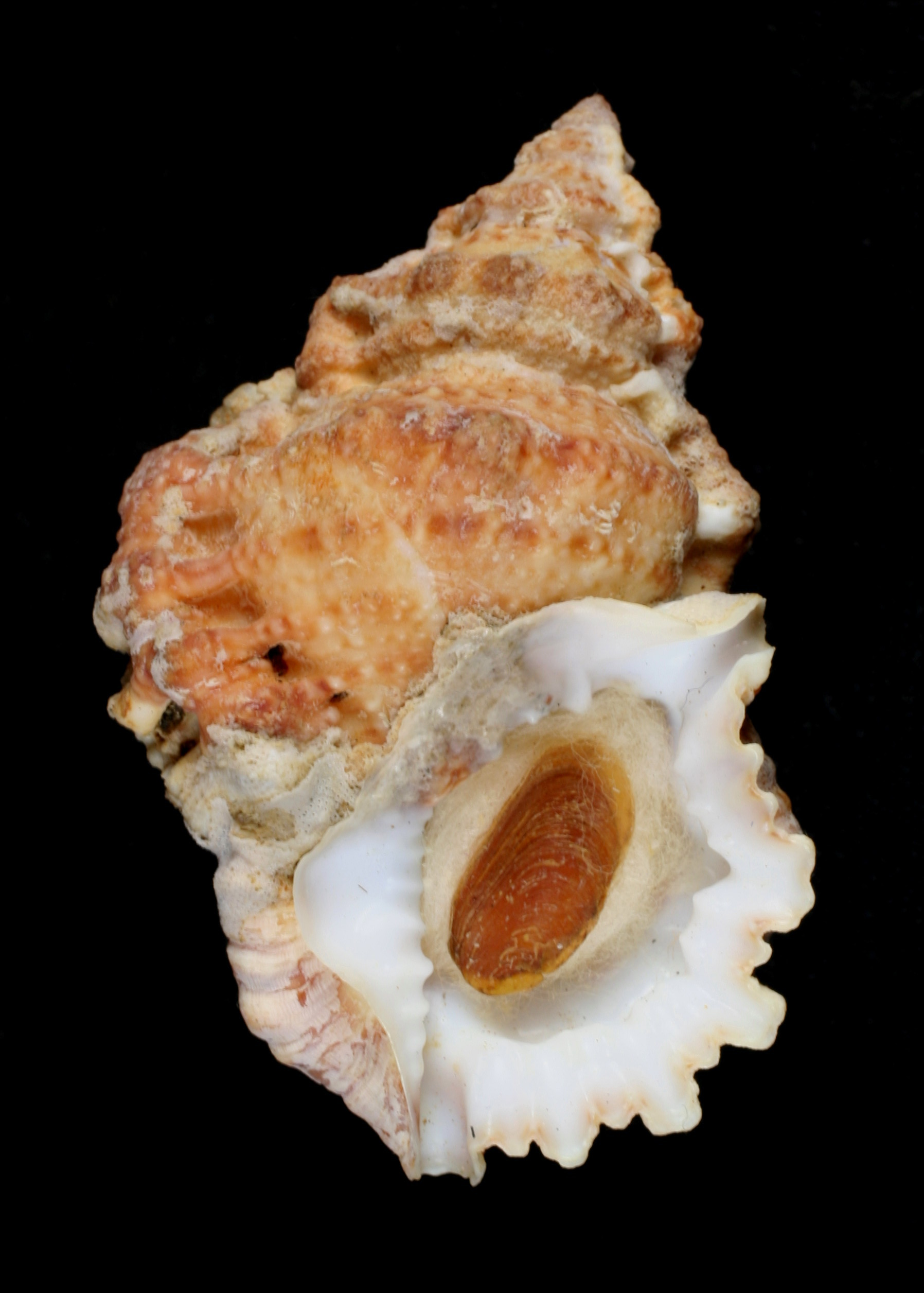
- Apertural view of Bursa rugosa (Sowerby II, 1835) with operculum

Scientific classification
- Kingdom: Animalia
- Phylum: Mollusca
- Class: Gastropoda
- Subclass: Caenogastropoda
- Order: Littorinimorpha
- Family: Bursidae
- Genus: Bursa
- Species: B. rugosa

Binomial name
- Bursa rugosa (G.B. Sowerby II, 1835)

Synonyms
- Bursa calcipicta Keen 1958; Ranella rugosa G.B. Sowerby II, 1835

= Bursa rugosa =

Species of gastropod

Bursa rugosa is a species of sea snail, a marine gastropod mollusk in the family Bursidae.

This species is carnivorous and it reproduces sexually.

== Description ==
The shell length of Bursa rugosa attains about 46 mm.It was originally described by G. B. Sowerby II in 1835 (as Ranella rugosa).

== Distribution ==
This species occurs in Tanzania.
