= Bursa bufonia =

- Bursa bufonia shells

Scientific classification
- Kingdom: Animalia
- Phylum: Mollusca
- Class: Gastropoda
- Subclass: Caenogastropoda
- Order: Littorinimorpha
- Family: Bursidae
- Genus: Bursa
- Species: B. bufonia

Binomial name
- Bursa bufonia (Gmelin, 1791)

Synonyms
- Bursa bufonia dunkeri Kira, 1959; Bursa dunkeri Kira, 1962; Bursa mammata Röding, 1798; Bursa monitata Röding, 1798; Bursa (Bursa) monitata Röding, P.F., 1798; Gyrineum bufonium Link, 1807; Murex bufonia Gmelin, 1791; Ranella bufonia (Gmelin, 1791)

Species of gastropod

Bursa bufonia, common name the warty frog shell, is a species of sea snail, a marine gastropod mollusk in the family Bursidae, the frog shells.

== Distribution ==
This species occurs in the Red Sea and in the Indian Ocean off Madagascar, Aldabra, Chagos and the Mascarene Basin; and in the Western Pacific.

== Description ==
The length of the shell varies between 23 mm and 101 mm.

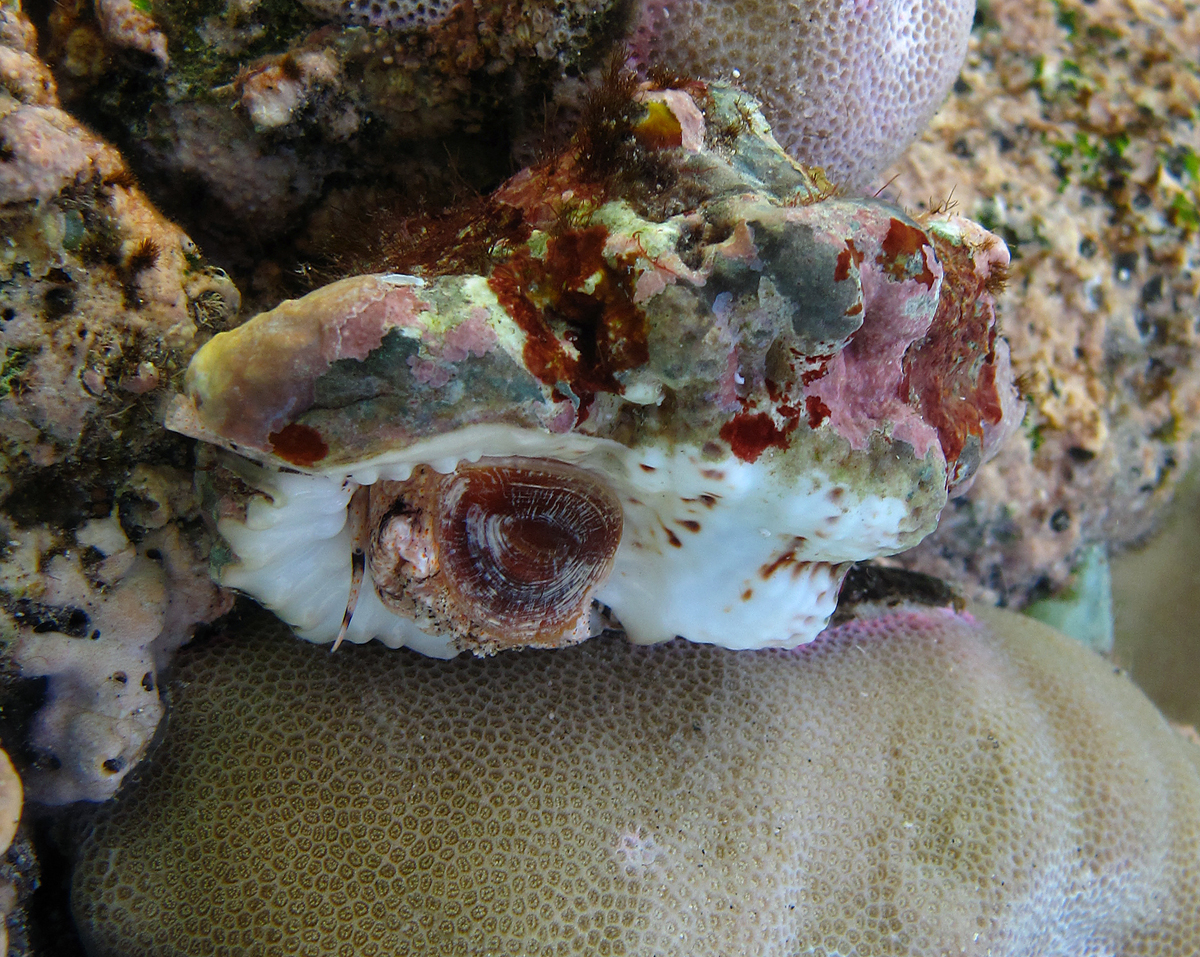
A live Bursa bufonia.
