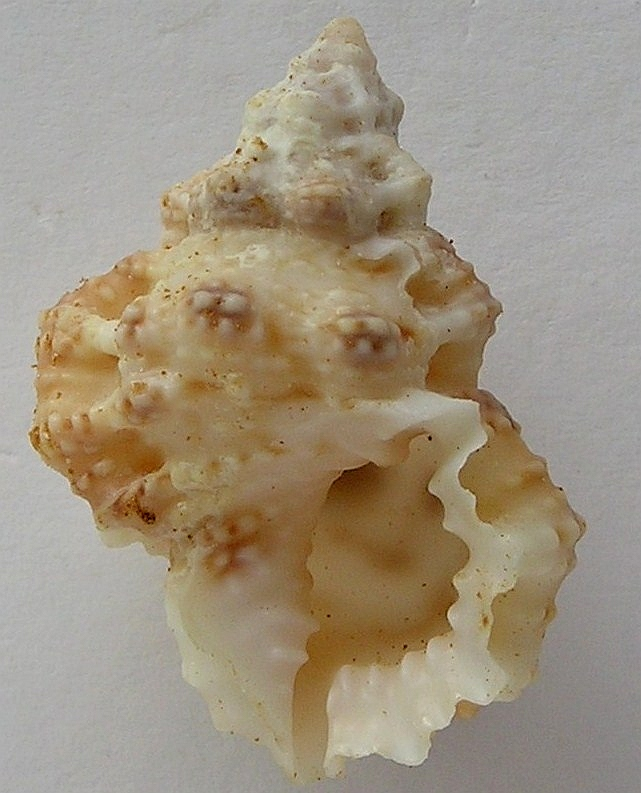
- Apertural view of a shell of Bursa grayana

Scientific classification
- Kingdom: Animalia
- Phylum: Mollusca
- Class: Gastropoda
- Subclass: Caenogastropoda
- Order: Littorinimorpha
- Family: Bursidae
- Genus: Bursa
- Species: B. grayana

Binomial name
- Bursa grayana Dunker, 1862

Synonyms
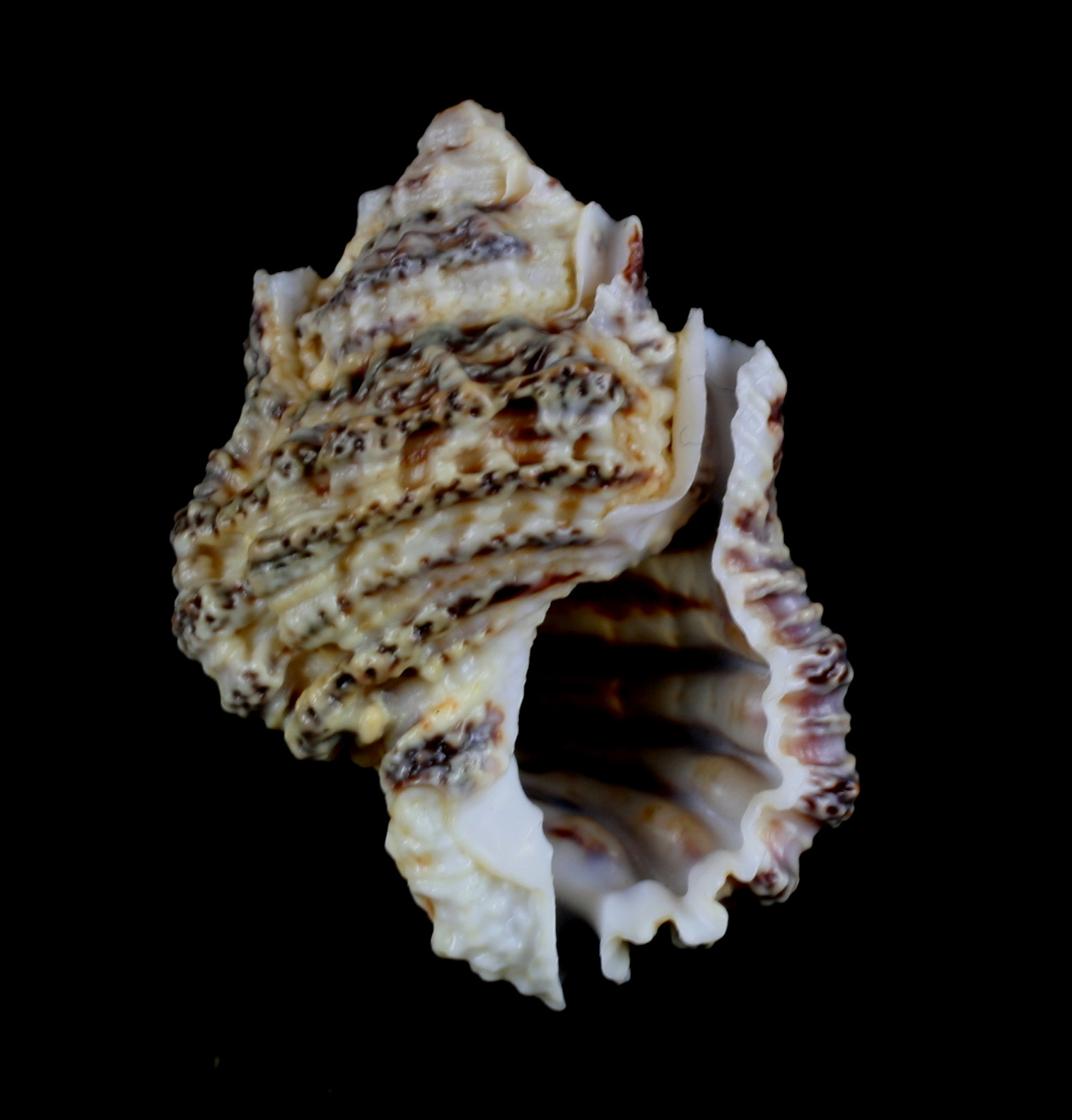
- Bursa pacamoni Matthews & Coelho, 1971 Apertural view of a shell of Bursa grayana (Dunker, 1862)

= Bursa grayana =

Species of gastropod

Bursa grayana is a species of sea snail, a marine gastropod mollusk in the family Bursidae, the frog shells.

== Distribution ==
This species occurs in the Caribbean Sea and the Gulf of Mexico; in the Atlantic Ocean off Brazil.

== Description ==
The maximum recorded shell length is 55 mm.

== Habitat ==
Minimum recorded depth is 0 m. Maximum recorded depth is 93 m.
