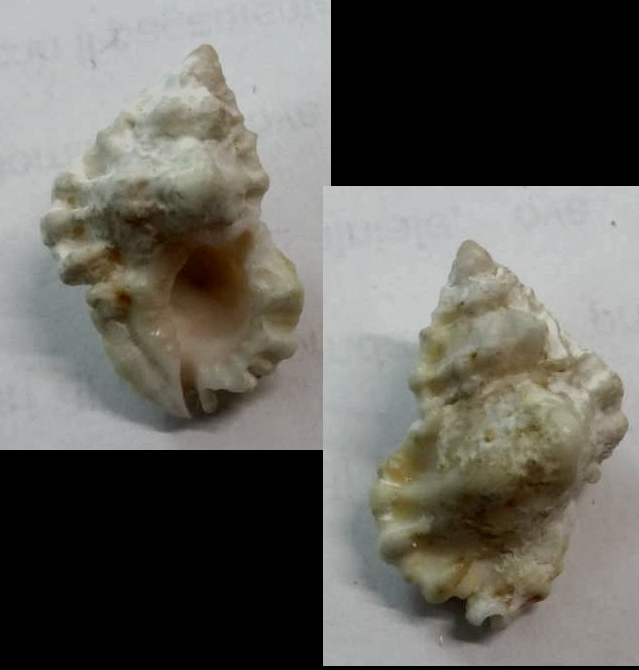
- Shell of Bursa davidboschi

Scientific classification
- Kingdom: Animalia
- Phylum: Mollusca
- Class: Gastropoda
- Subclass: Caenogastropoda
- Order: Littorinimorpha
- Family: Bursidae
- Genus: Bursa
- Species: B. davidboschi

Binomial name
- Bursa davidboschi Beu, 1987

Synonyms
- Bursa (Bursa) davidboschi Beu, 1987

= Bursa davidboschi =

Species of gastropod

Bursa davidboschi is a species of sea snail, a marine gastropod mollusk in the family Bursidae, the frog shells.
