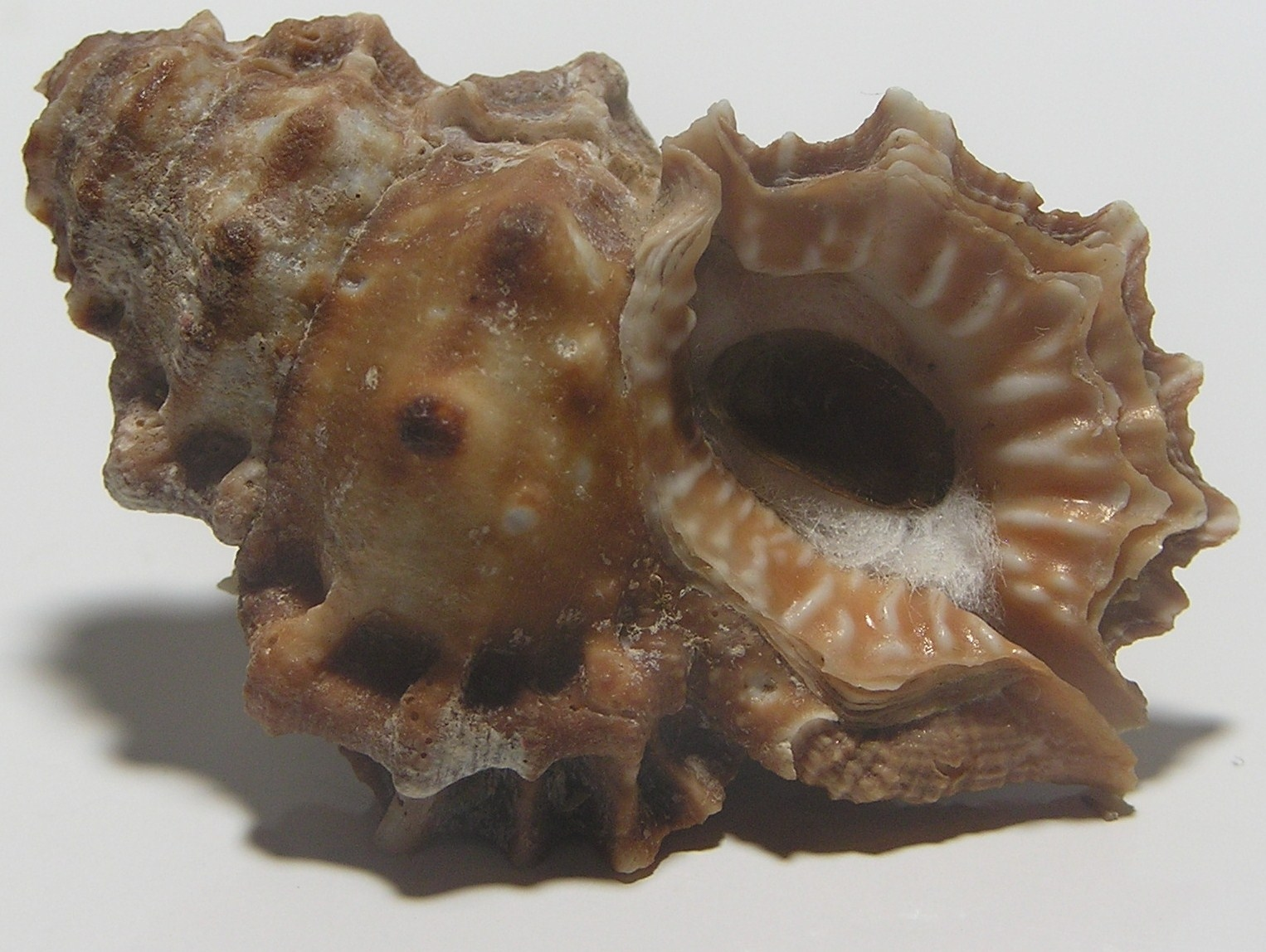
- Apertural view of a shell of Alanbeuella corrugata (Perry, 1811)

Scientific classification
- Kingdom: Animalia
- Phylum: Mollusca
- Class: Gastropoda
- Subclass: Caenogastropoda
- Order: Littorinimorpha
- Family: Bursidae
- Genus: Alanbeuella
- Species: A. corrugata

Binomial name
- Alanbeuella corrugata (Perry, 1811)
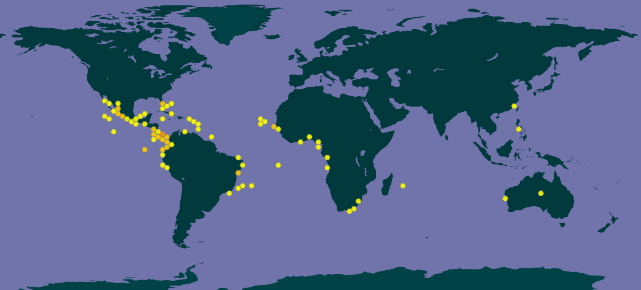

Synonyms
- Biplex corrugata Perry, 1811; Bursa (Colubrellina) caelata (Broderip, 1832); Bursa (Colubrellina) caelata louisa M. Smith, 1948; Bursa caelata (Broderip, 1833); Bursa caelata louisa M. Smith, 1948; Bursa corrugata (Perry, 1811) ·; Bursa pustulosa Reeve, 1844; Bursa pustulosa var. jabik Fischer-Piette, 1942 ·; Ranella caelata Broderip, 1833; Ranella ponderosa Reeve, 1844; Ranella pustulosa Reeve, 1844; Ranella pustulosa var. jabik Fischer-Piette, 1942; Ranella semigranosa Lamarck, 1822

= Alanbeuella corrugata =

Species of gastropod

Alanbeuella corrugata (gaudy frog shell) is a species of sea snail, a marine gastropod mollusk in the family Bursidae, the frog shells.

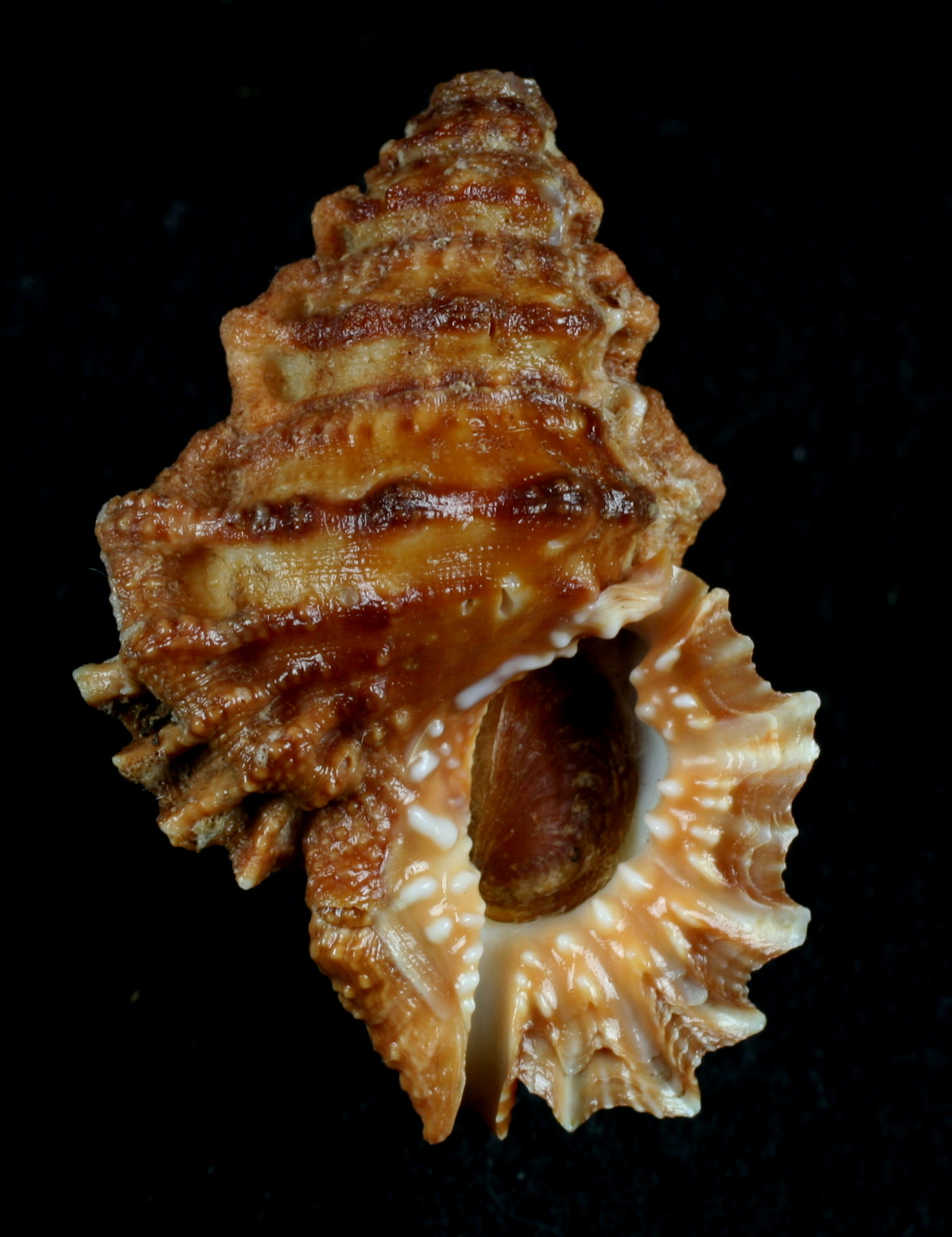
Apertural view of Bursa corrugata (Perry, 1811) with operculum.

The subspecies Alanbeuella corrugata lineata Nowell-Usticke, 1959 has become a synonym of Bursa granularis (Röding, 1798), itself a synonym of Dulcerana granularis (Röding, 1798)

== Distribution ==
This marine species occurs in the Atlantic Ocean off West Africa, the Canary Islands, Cape Verdes and Brazil; in the Caribbean Sea, the Gulf of Mexico and the Lesser Antilles.

== Description ==
The maximum recorded shell length is 75 mm.

(Described as Ranella pustulosa Reeve, 1844) The shell is ovate, somewhat depressed, and ponderous, with a chestnut color. The whorls are encircled by two or three rows of large, livid chestnut-colored pimples. The varices are granulously ridged. The columella is granulously wrinkled, with white wrinkles. The outer lip is very flatly fimbriated, sinuated at the upper part, and is brown, radiated with whitish grooves.

== Habitat ==
Minimum recorded depth is 2 m. Maximum recorded depth is 137 m.
