= Bursa natalensis =

Scientific classification
- Kingdom: Animalia
- Phylum: Mollusca
- Class: Gastropoda
- Subclass: Caenogastropoda
- Order: Littorinimorpha
- Family: Bursidae
- Genus: Bursa
- Species: B. natalensis

Binomial name
- Bursa natalensis Coelho & Matthews, 1970

Species of gastropod

Bursa natalensis is a species of sea snail, a marine gastropod mollusk in the family Bursidae, the frog shells.

== Description ==
The maximum recorded shell length is 84.7 mm.

== Habitat ==
Minimum recorded depth is 40 m. Maximum recorded depth is 780 m.
