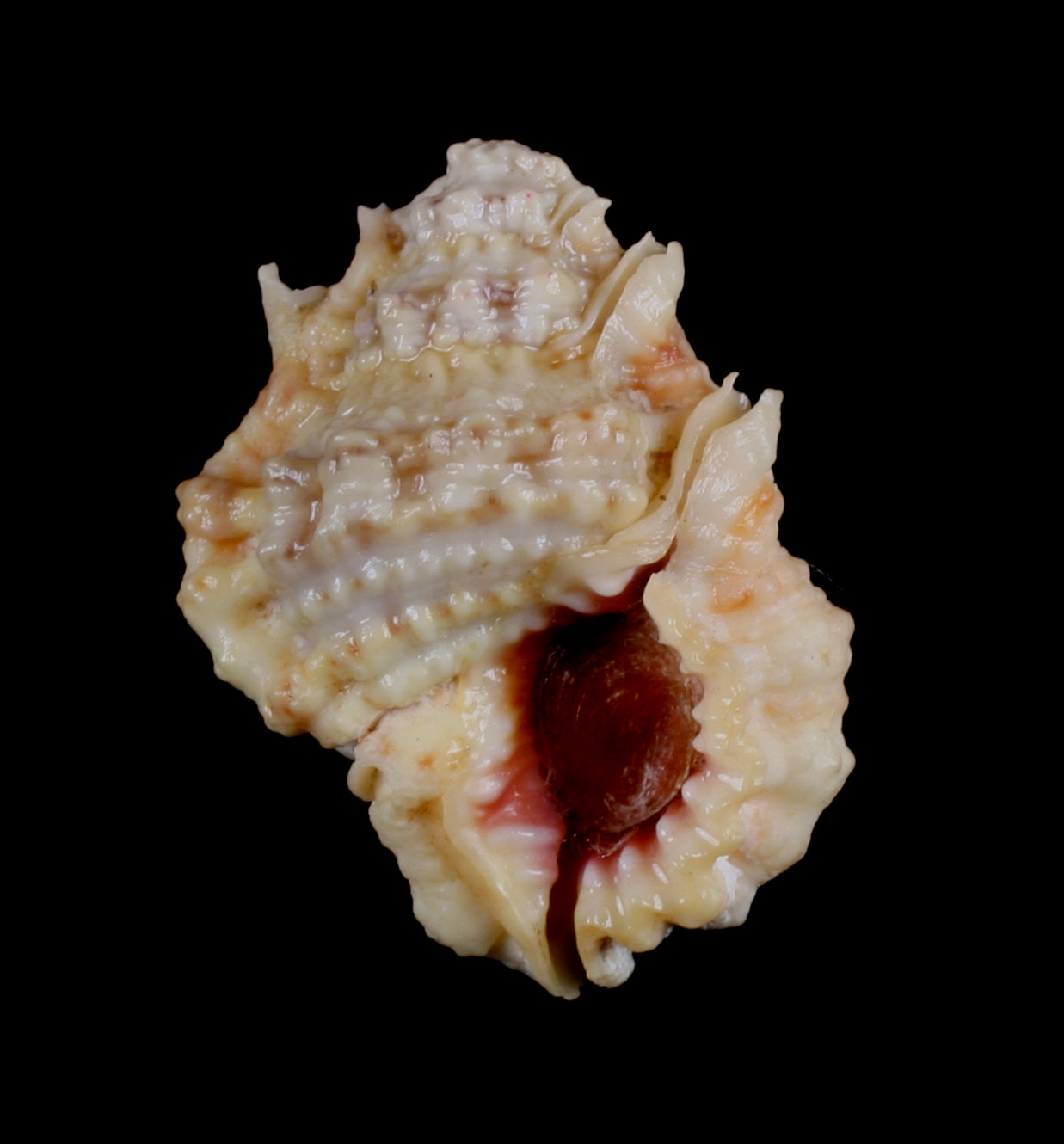
- Bursa rosa shell

Scientific classification
- Kingdom: Animalia
- Phylum: Mollusca
- Class: Gastropoda
- Subclass: Caenogastropoda
- Order: Littorinimorpha
- Family: Bursidae
- Genus: Bursa
- Species: B. rosa

Binomial name
- Bursa rosa (Perry, 1811)

Synonyms
- Biplex rosa Perry, 1811; Bursa siphonata (Reeve, 1844) ·; Ranella siphonata Reeve, 1844

= Bursa rosa =

Species of gastropod

Bursa rosa is a species of sea snail, a marine gastropod mollusk in the family Bursidae, the frog shells.

== Description ==
The length of the shell varies between 21 mm and 55 mm. It has an anal canal that forms a long projecting spout that is preserved on the upper whorls, and both the columella and outer lip have ridges. The shell is generally dirty yellow or cream in color with brown spotting, while the aperture and inner lip are violet.

== Distribution ==
This marine species occurs in the Indo-West-Pacific; also off the Philippines, New Caledonia and Australia (New South Wales, Northern Territory, Queensland, Western Australia).
