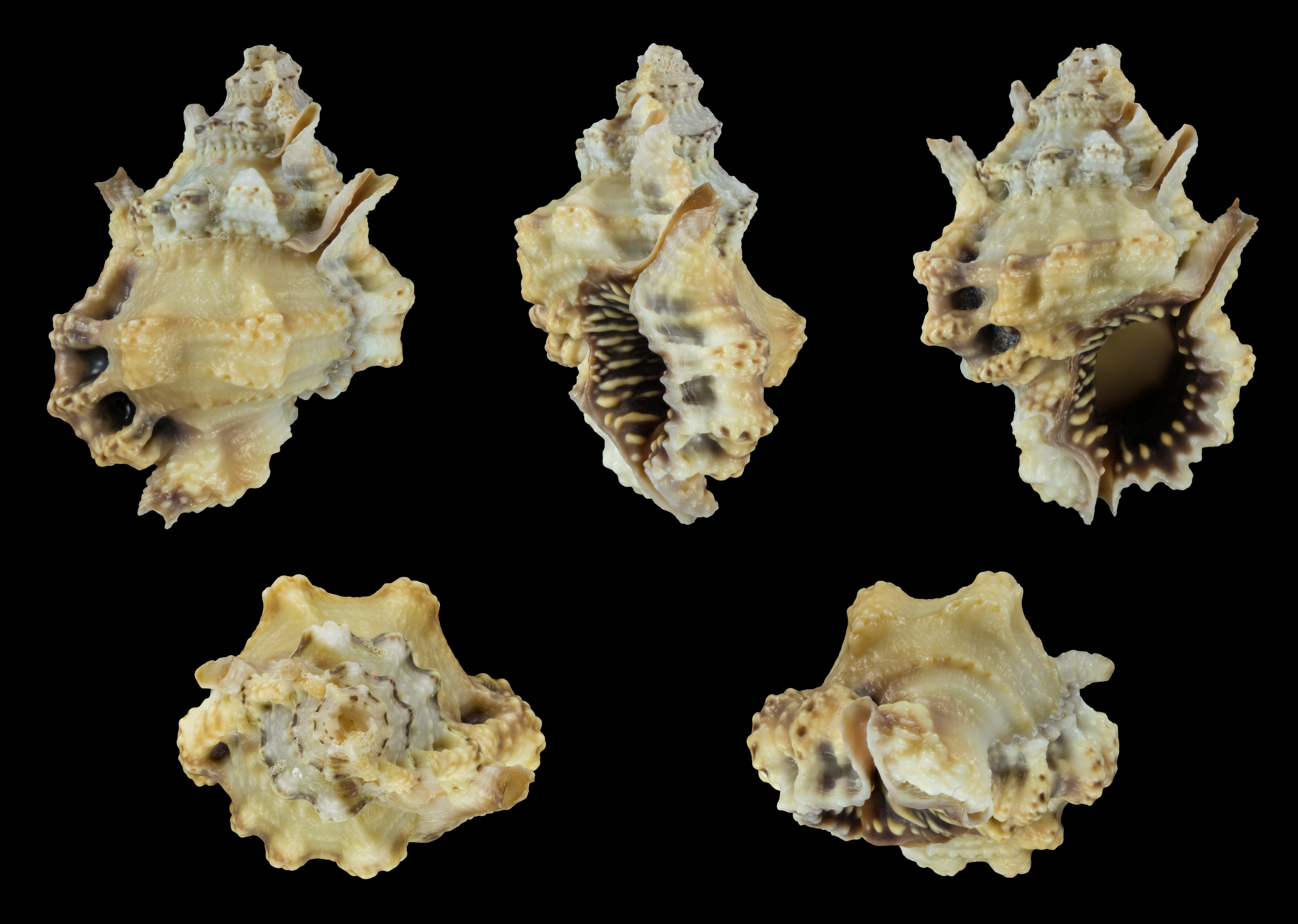
- Shell of Bursa lamarckii (Deshayes, 1853)

Scientific classification
- Kingdom: Animalia
- Phylum: Mollusca
- Class: Gastropoda
- Subclass: Caenogastropoda
- Order: Littorinimorpha
- Family: Bursidae
- Genus: Bursa
- Species: B. lamarckii

Binomial name
- Bursa lamarckii (Deshayes, 1853)

Synonyms
- Bursa angioyorum Parth, 1990; Bursa muehlhaeusseri Parth, 1990; Ranella lamarckii Deshayes, 1853 (basionym); Bufonaria lamarckii (Deshayes, 1853); Bursa lamarkii (Deshayes, 1853) (misspelling)

= Bursa lamarckii =

Species of gastropod

Bursa lamarckii (Lamarck's frog shell) is a species of sea snail, a marine gastropod mollusk in the family Bursidae, the frog shells.

== Description ==
The shell size varies between 33 mm and 80 mm.

== Distribution ==
This species occurs in the Red Sea and in the central and west Indo-Pacific region; also off the Philippines.

== Etymology ==
The snail is named after Jean-Baptiste Lamarck.
