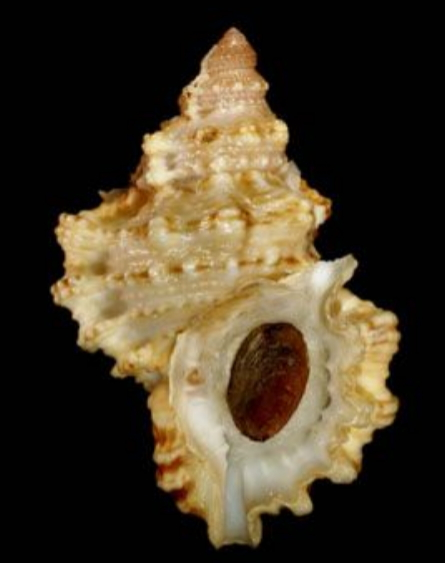
- Shell of Bursa calcipicta (specimen at the Natural History Museum, Rotterdam)

Scientific classification
- Kingdom: Animalia
- Phylum: Mollusca
- Class: Gastropoda
- Subclass: Caenogastropoda
- Order: Littorinimorpha
- Family: Bursidae
- Genus: Bursa
- Species: B. calcipicta

Binomial name
- Bursa calcipicta Dall, 1908

Synonyms
- Bursa (Lampadopsis) calcipicta Dall, 1908

= Bursa calcipicta =

Species of sea snail

Bursa calcipicta is a species of large sea snail in the genus Bursa. Its earliest known description is by W. H. Dall.

== Description ==
It has a fine texture consisting of beads and cords, like other species in the genus Bursa. Adults range from 30 millimeters to 55 millimeters in length.

(Original description) The shell is of moderate size, with a pale brown base color covered by a thin, white, chalky, and deciduous outer layer. This layer is adorned with fine, spiral threads (approximately six per millimeter), intersected by evenly spaced, minute, raised lines aligned with the shell's growth patterns. This textured coating envelops the entire shell, except in areas affected by erosion.

The shell comprises seven whorls that increase rapidly in size. The first three whorls are smooth, evenly convex, and nuclear, transitioning abruptly into the adult sculpture. Each whorl has two lateral varices that are nearly continuous along the spire. The whorls are ornamented at the shoulder with four prominent, rounded nodules arranged in a spiral series, increasing to five nodules on the last half of the body whorl. A secondary, smaller, and slightly more numerous spiral series is present anterior to the primary nodules. Between the appressed suture and the shoulder, there are four small, beaded spirals, with another spiral situated between the two series of nodules. The base of the shell features similar, though less distinct, sculptural elements.

The aperture is ovate with a wide, prominent, semitubular siphonal canal at the suture. The outer lip is strongly varicose, with four large, rounded nodules on the varix. The edge of the lip reflects the shell's external sculpture but lacks interior lirae. Internally, the aperture is white, accented by a few faint brown spots. The body of the shell bears a thin layer of adherent callus with a narrow subsutural ridge near the middle and a small brown spot on the left side.

The columella is white, callous, and arcuate, featuring six to eight low, sharp, spiral lirations. The siphonal canal is short, wide, and curved to the right, accompanied by a pronounced siphonal fasciole and a subtle chink beneath the anterior edge of the columellar callus. The throat of the aperture is tinged with pink, adding a delicate touch of color to the shell's overall appearance.

== Location ==
It is a pacific species, having been found around the Gulf of Panama. Its geographic range is generally near Panama, Ecuador, and the Galapagos Islands. It has been found in the Bay of Chiriqui, Panama.
