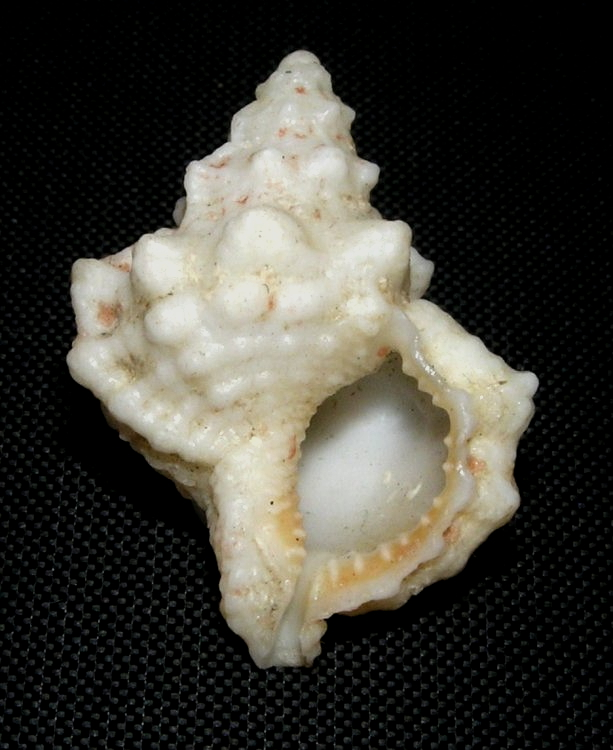
- Shell of Bursa asperrima

Scientific classification
- Kingdom: Animalia
- Phylum: Mollusca
- Class: Gastropoda
- Subclass: Caenogastropoda
- Order: Littorinimorpha
- Family: Bursidae
- Genus: Bursa
- Species: B. asperrima

Binomial name
- Bursa asperrima Dunker, 1862

= Bursa asperrima =

Species of gastropod

Bursa asperrima is a species of sea snail, a marine gastropod mollusk in the family Bursidae, the frog shells.
