= Bursa luteostoma =

Scientific classification
- Kingdom: Animalia
- Phylum: Mollusca
- Class: Gastropoda
- Subclass: Caenogastropoda
- Order: Littorinimorpha
- Family: Bursidae
- Genus: Bursa
- Species: B. luteostoma

Binomial name
- Bursa luteostoma (Pease, 1861)

Synonyms
- Ranella luteostoma Pease, 1861

Species of gastropod

Bursa luteostoma is a species of sea snail, a marine gastropod mollusk in the family Bursidae, the frog shells.

== Description ==
The length of the shell attains 80 mm.

== Distribution ==
This marine species occurs off Hawaii.
