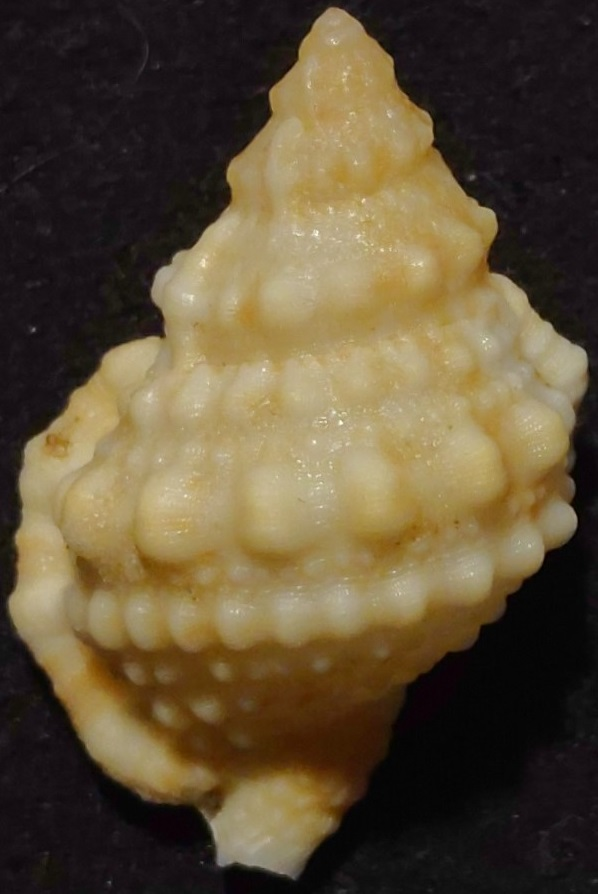

Scientific classification
- Kingdom: Animalia
- Phylum: Mollusca
- Class: Gastropoda
- Subclass: Caenogastropoda
- Order: Littorinimorpha
- Family: Bursidae
- Genus: Bursa
- Species: B. humilis

Binomial name
- Bursa humilis Beu, 1981

Synonyms
- Bursa (Bufonariella) ranelloides humilis Beu, 1981

= Bursa humilis =

Species of gastropod

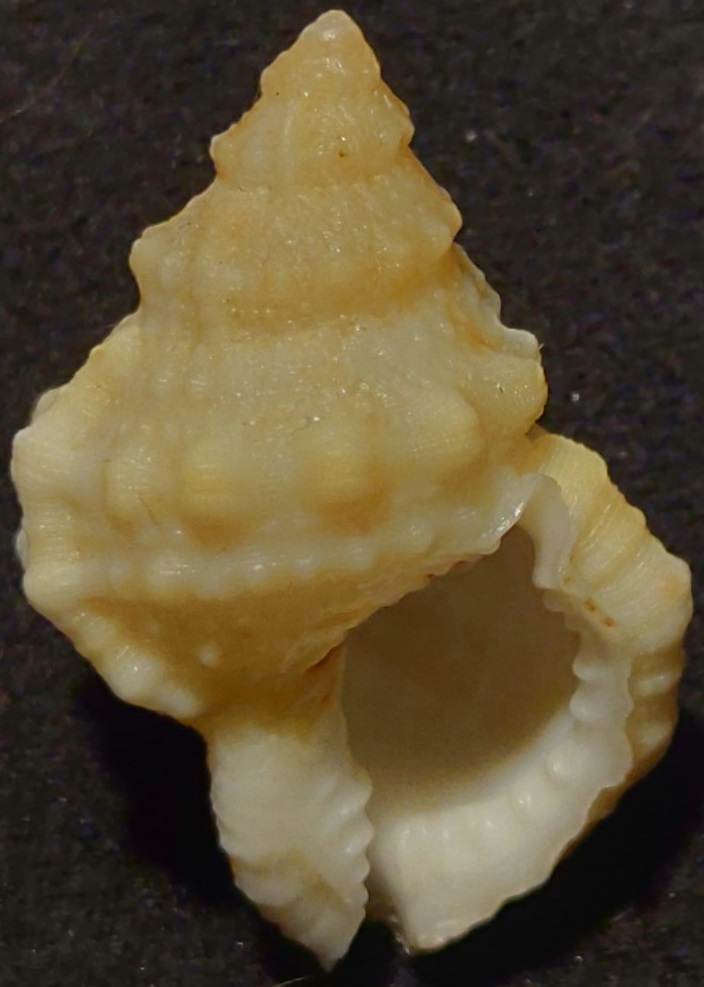

Bursa humilis is a species of sea snail, a marine gastropod mollusk in the family Bursidae, the frog shells.

== Description ==
The length of the shell attains 55 mm.

== Distribution ==
This marine species occurs off the Philippines and off Western Australia.
