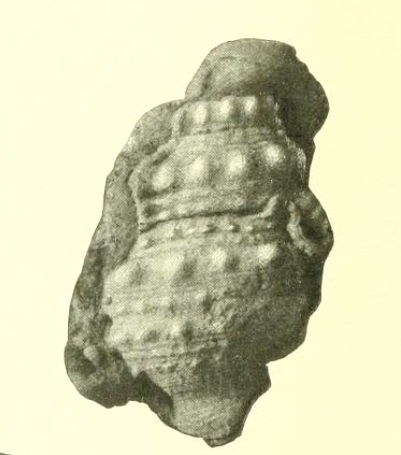
- Shell of †Alanbeuella victrix (holotype)

Scientific classification
- Kingdom: Animalia
- Phylum: Mollusca
- Class: Gastropoda
- Subclass: Caenogastropoda
- Order: Littorinimorpha
- Family: Bursidae
- Genus: Alanbeuella
- Species: †A. victrix

Binomial name
- †Alanbeuella victrix (Dall, 1916)

Synonyms
- †Bursa victrix Dall, 1916

= Alanbeuella victrix =

Extinct species of gastropod

Alanbeuella victrix is an extinct species of sea snail, a marine gastropod mollusk in the family Bursidae, the frog shells.

== Description ==
The height of the three visible whorls is 42 mm (1.7 in), the greatest diameter is 27 mm (1.1 in).

(Original description) The shell is moderately sized, with the apex missing in the type specimen. The specimen is a cast from a mold comprising three whorls, each with two discontinuous lateral varices. The varices are rounded and nodulous, harmonizing with the spiral sculpture of the roundly inflated whorls. The suture is distinct and not channeled.

The sculpture features on the body whorl a smooth interval sloping from the suture, followed by a sparsely prominent beaded cord. This is succeeded by a wider interval carrying a less prominent and less distinctly beaded cord, then a simple spiral thread. A broad band forms the shoulder of the whorl, carrying about a dozen semiglobular prominent nodulations, and is sharply spirally striated. In front of this are two subequal and equidistant narrower bands, similarly but more closely and feebly nodulous and striated, with the suture laid in front on the preceding whorls. The base of the shell displays two minutely beaded spirals alternating with single plain spiral threads, followed by eight to ten smaller, mostly simple, closely adjacent threads, with one or two showing a tendency towards beading. The siphonal canal is short, twisted, and obscurely spirally threaded.

== Distribution ==
Fossils of this marine species were found in Oligocene strata in Georgia, USA.
