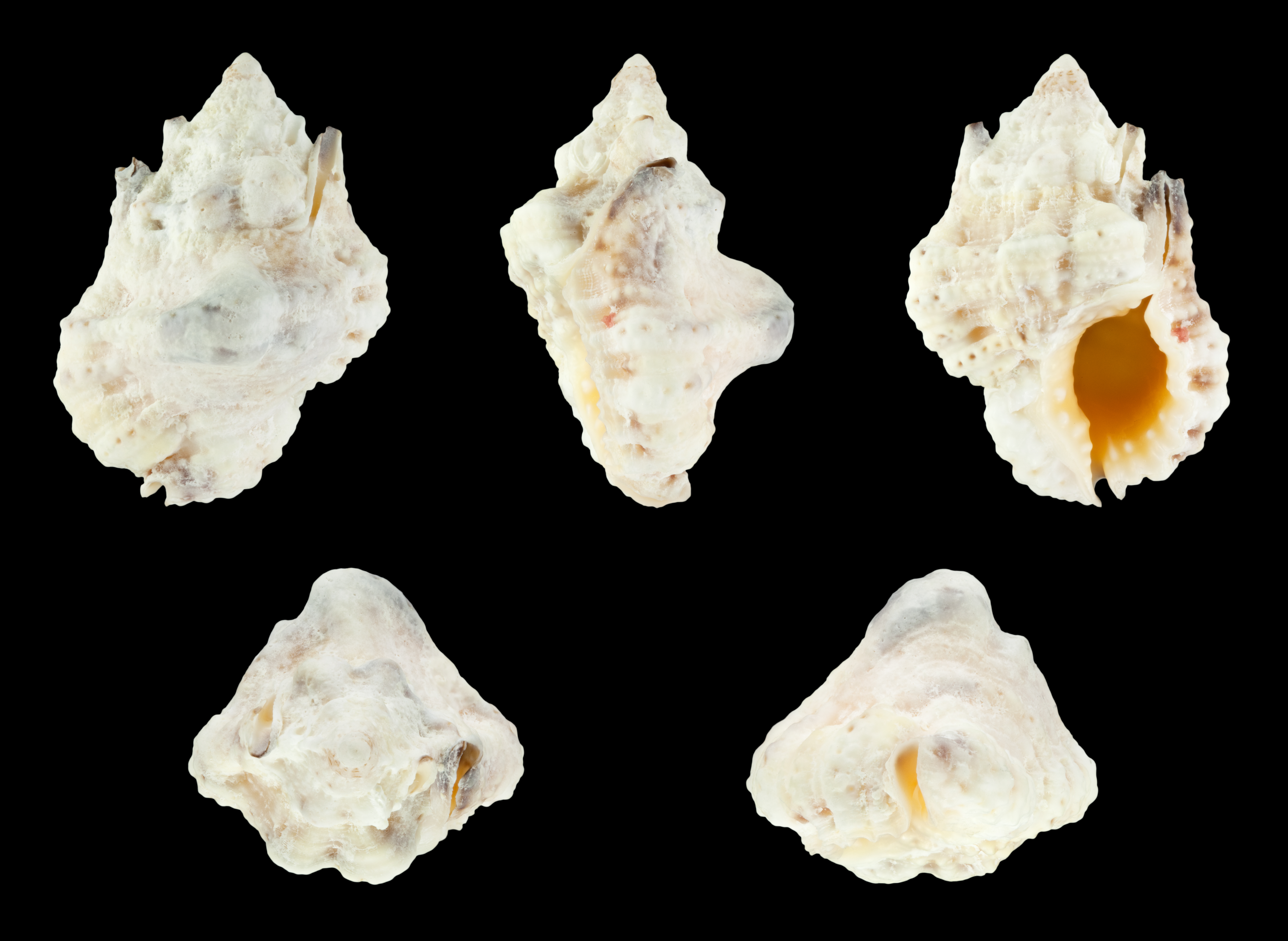

Scientific classification
- Kingdom: Animalia
- Phylum: Mollusca
- Class: Gastropoda
- Subclass: Caenogastropoda
- Order: Littorinimorpha
- Family: Bursidae
- Genus: Bursa
- Species: B. tuberosissima

Binomial name
- Bursa tuberosissima (Reeve, 1844)

Synonyms
- Bursa leo Shikama, 1964; Ranella tuberosissima Reeve, 1844

= Bursa tuberosissima =

Species of gastropod

Bursa tuberosissima, common name : the yellow mouthed frog shell, is a species of sea snail, a marine gastropod mollusc in the family Bursidae, the frog shells.

== Description ==
The shell size varies between 20 mm and 62 mm.

== Distribution ==
This species is distributed in the seas along the Philippines and Australia.
