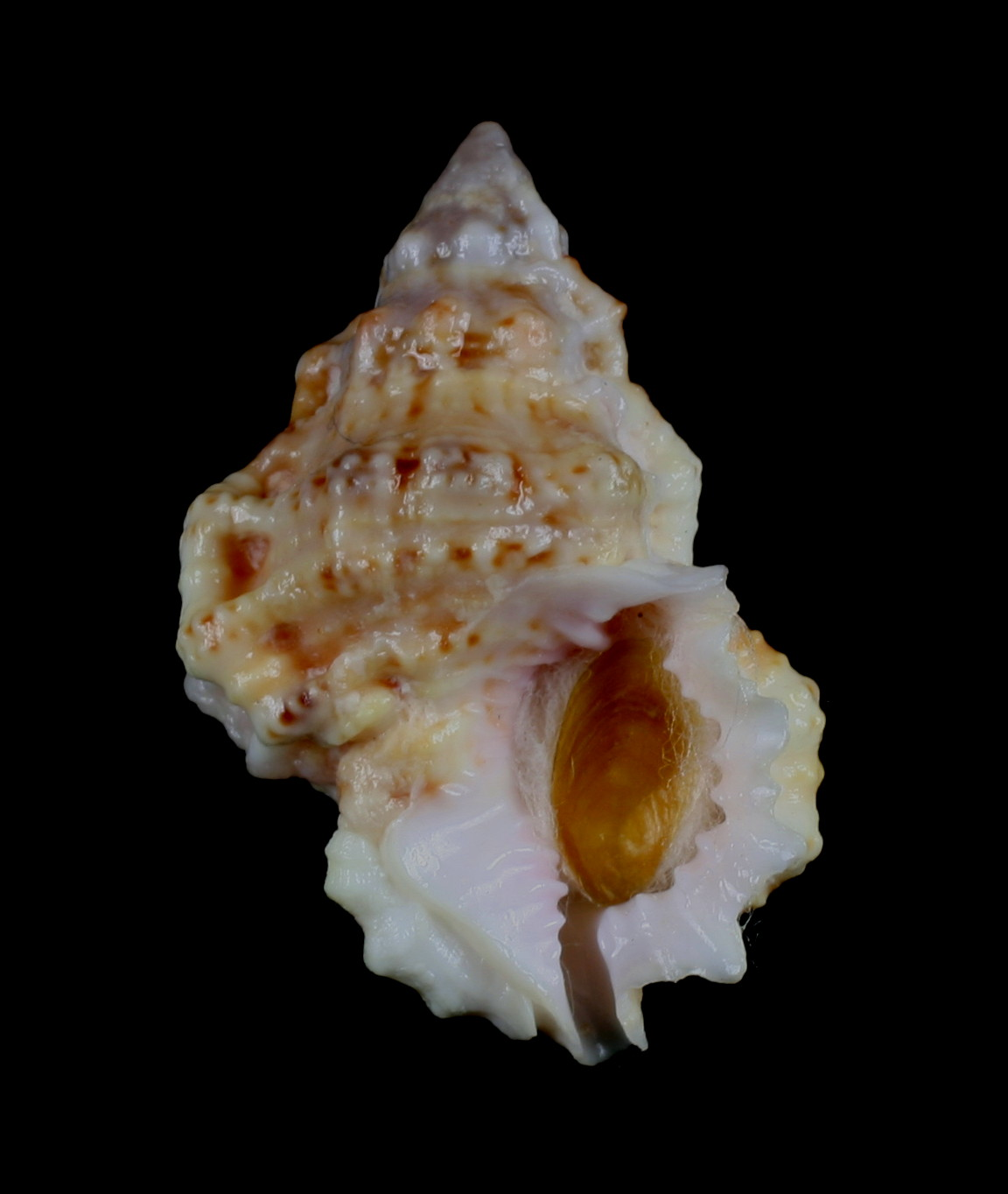
- Apertural view of Lampasopsis thomae

Scientific classification
- Kingdom: Animalia
- Phylum: Mollusca
- Class: Gastropoda
- Subclass: Caenogastropoda
- Order: Littorinimorpha
- Superfamily: Tonnoidea
- Family: Bursidae
- Genus: Lampasopsis; Jousseaume, 1881

Type species
- Ranella rhodostoma G. B. Sowerby II, 1835

Synonyms
- Lampadopsis P. Fischer, 1884 (unjustified emendation of Lampasopsis Jousseaume, 1881)

= Lampasopsis =

Genus of gastropods

Lampasopsis is a genus of sea snails, marine gastropod mollusks in the family Bursidae, the frog shells.

== Species ==
- Lampasopsis cruentata (G. B. Sowerby II, 1835)
- Lampasopsis lucaensis (Parth, 1991)
- Lampasopsis rhodostoma (G. B. Sowerby II, 1835)
- Lampasopsis thomae (d'Orbigny, 1847)
