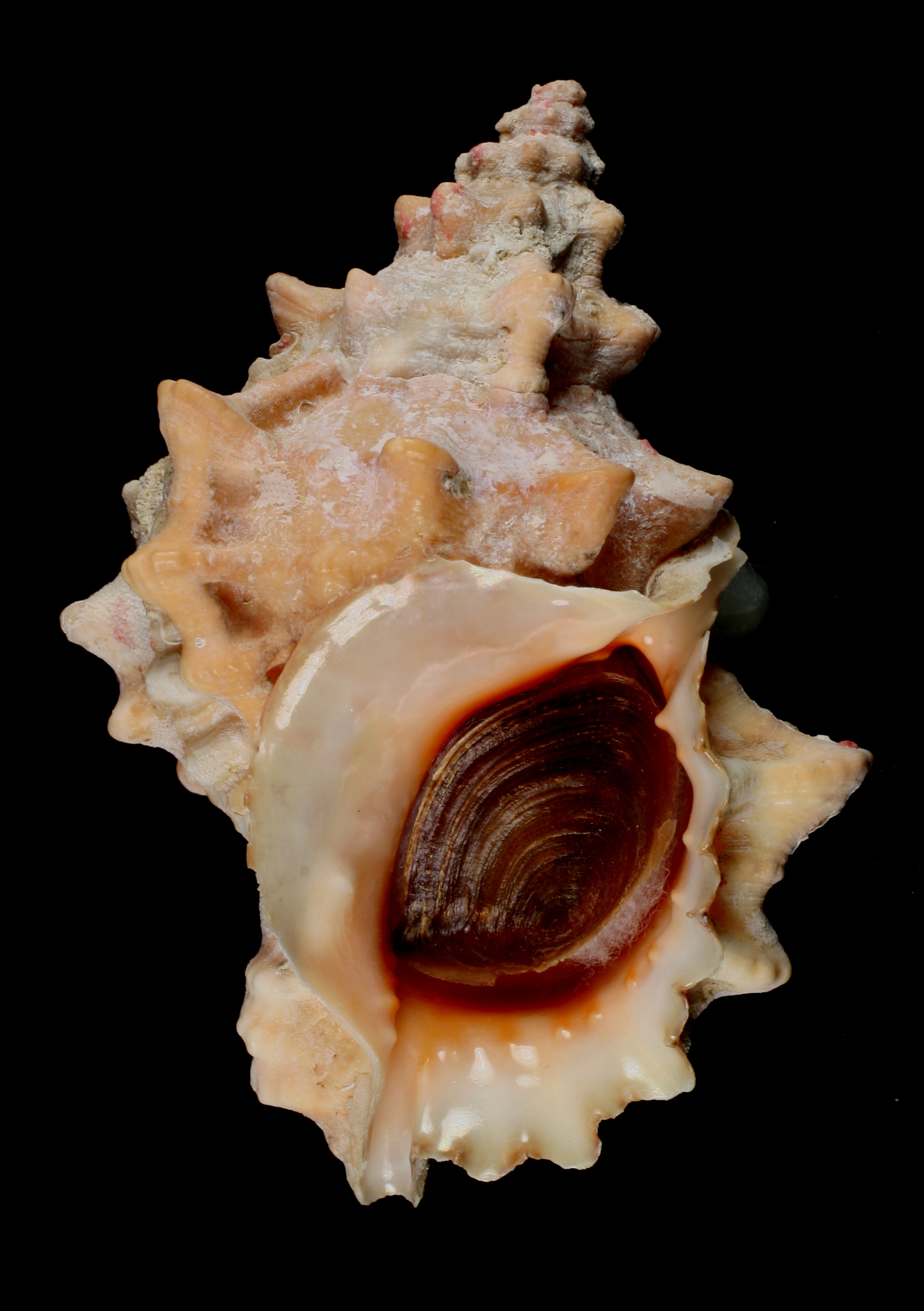

Scientific classification
- Kingdom: Animalia
- Phylum: Mollusca
- Class: Gastropoda
- Subclass: Caenogastropoda
- Order: Littorinimorpha
- Family: Bursidae
- Genus: Marsupina
- Species: M. bufo

Binomial name
- Marsupina bufo (Bruguière, 1792)

Synonyms
- Argobuccinum siphonatum T. Iredale, 1910; Buffo spadiceus Montfort, 1810; Bufonaria bufo (Bruguière, 1792); Bufonaria (Bufonaria) spadicea Montfort, P.D. de, 181; Bursa crassa (Dillwyn, 1817); Bursa crassa carribbaea M. Smith, 1948; Bursa gibbosa Röding, 1798; Murex bufo Bruguière, 1792; Murex crassus Dillwyn, 1817; Ranella crassa bituberculata (f) Schepman, M.M., 1887; Ranella granulata Lamarck, 1816

= Marsupina bufo =

Species of gastropod

Marsupina bufo, common name the chestnut frog shell, is a species of sea snail, a marine gastropod mollusk in the family Bursidae, the frog shells.

== Distribution ==
This species is distributed in the Gulf of Mexico, the Caribbean Sea and the Lesser Antilles; in the Atlantic Ocean from North Carolina to Northern Brazil.

== Description ==
The shell size varies between 20 mm and 75 mm.

The maximum recorded shell length is 60 mm.

== Habitat ==
Minimum recorded depth is 0 m. Maximum recorded depth is 100 m.
