= Lampasopsis lucaensis =

Scientific classification
- Kingdom: Animalia
- Phylum: Mollusca
- Class: Gastropoda
- Subclass: Caenogastropoda
- Order: Littorinimorpha
- Family: Bursidae
- Genus: Lampasopsis
- Species: L. lucaensis

Binomial name
- Lampasopsis lucaensis Parth, 1991

Synonyms
- Bursa lucaensis Parth, 1991

Species of gastropod

Lampasopsis lucaensis is a species of sea snail, a marine gastropod mollusk in the family Bursidae, the frog shells.

== Description ==
Original description: "Very small sized shell, the type measures 22.3 mm. Of very light weight, varices arranged at 180 degrees, elongated spire. The colour is from cream to light brown with yellow tinges on the varices. 4 main spiral cords, with 3 to 4 developed tubercules on the cords themselves. The mouth is oval, the internal lip is densely plicated over its whole length. The mouth is pink coloured, in the higher part of the internal lip with a darker tone. External lip with 5 groups of very long denticles, each group has 2 to 3 denticles. The protoconch is of 2,1/2 whorls, diameter 2.1 mm."

== Distribution ==
Locus typicus: "Cebu, Philippines."; also off Irian Jaya, Indonesia and New Caledonia.
