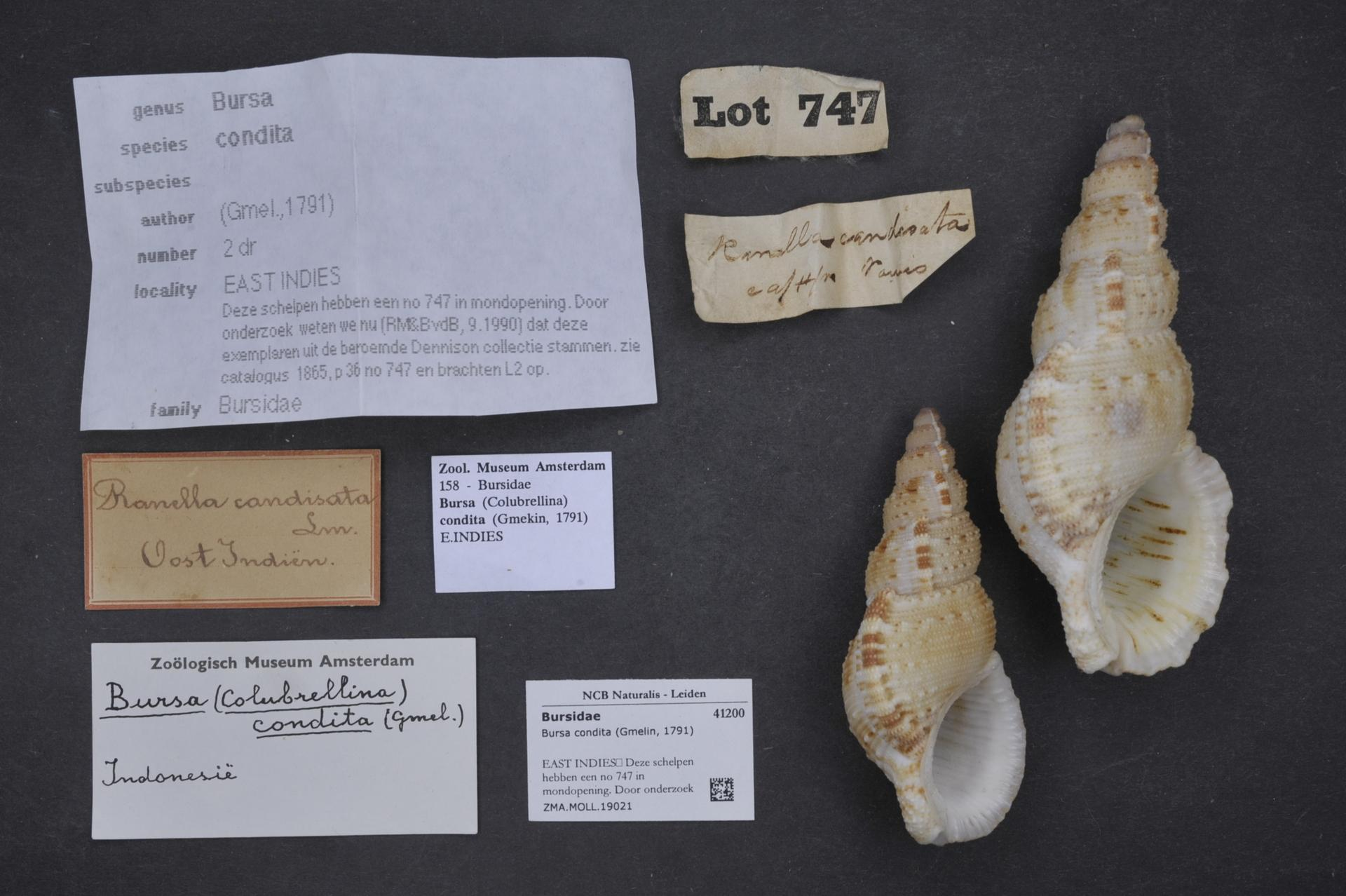

Scientific classification
- Kingdom: Animalia
- Phylum: Mollusca
- Class: Gastropoda
- Subclass: Caenogastropoda
- Order: Littorinimorpha
- Family: Bursidae
- Genus: Colubrellina
- Species: C. condita

Binomial name
- Colubrellina condita (Gmelin, 1791)

Synonyms
- Apollon candisatus (Röding, 1798).; Bursa condita (Gmelin, 1791); Colubrellina (Dulcerana) condita (Gmelin, 1791); Murex candisatus (Röding, 1798); Murex condita Gmelin, 1791; Ranella candisata Lamarck, 1822; Tritonium candisatum Röding, 1798

= Colubrellina condita =

Species of gastropod

Colubrellina condita is a species of sea snail, a marine gastropod mollusk in the family Bursidae, the frog shells.

== Description ==
The length of the shell attains 102 mm.

== Distribution ==
This marine species occurs in the Indo-West Pacific (Vanuatu, Marshall Islands; also off the Philippines and Queensland, Australia.
