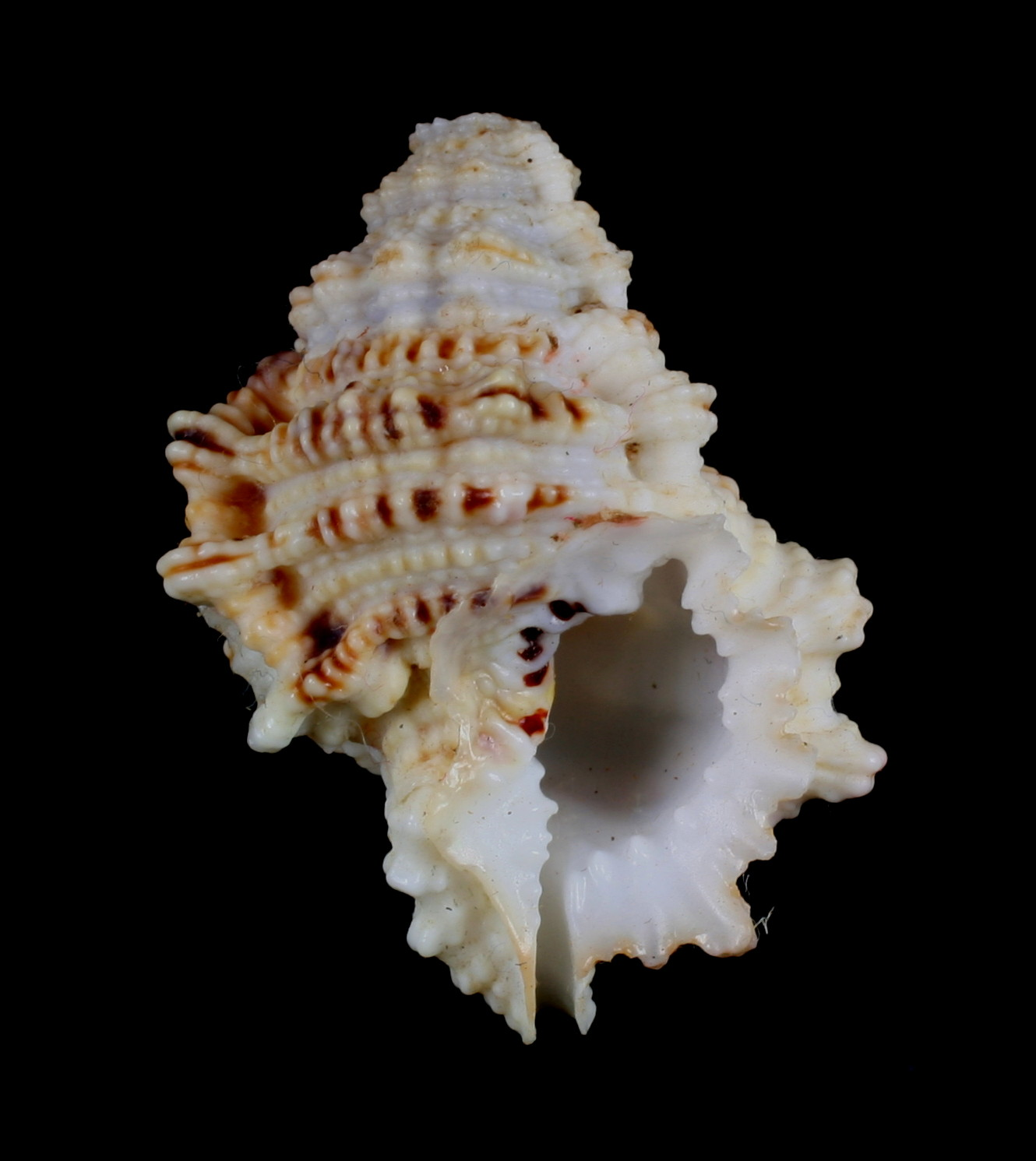
- Apertural view of Lampasopsis cruentata (G.B. Sowerby II, 1835)

Scientific classification
- Kingdom: Animalia
- Phylum: Mollusca
- Class: Gastropoda
- Subclass: Caenogastropoda
- Order: Littorinimorpha
- Family: Bursidae
- Genus: Lampasopsis
- Species: L. cruentata

Binomial name
- Lampasopsis cruentata (G.B. Sowerby II, 1835)

Synonyms
- Bursa cruentata (G. B. Sowerby II, 1835); Ranella cruentata G.B. Sowerby II, 1835

= Lampasopsis cruentata =

Species of gastropod

Lampasopsis cruentata is a species of sea snail, a marine gastropod mollusk in the family Bursidae, the frog shells.

== Description ==
The length of the shell varies between 28 mm and 44 mm.

== Distribution ==
This marine species occurs in the Indo-Pacific and off Papua New Guinea and Australia (Northern Territory, Queensland, Western Australia).
