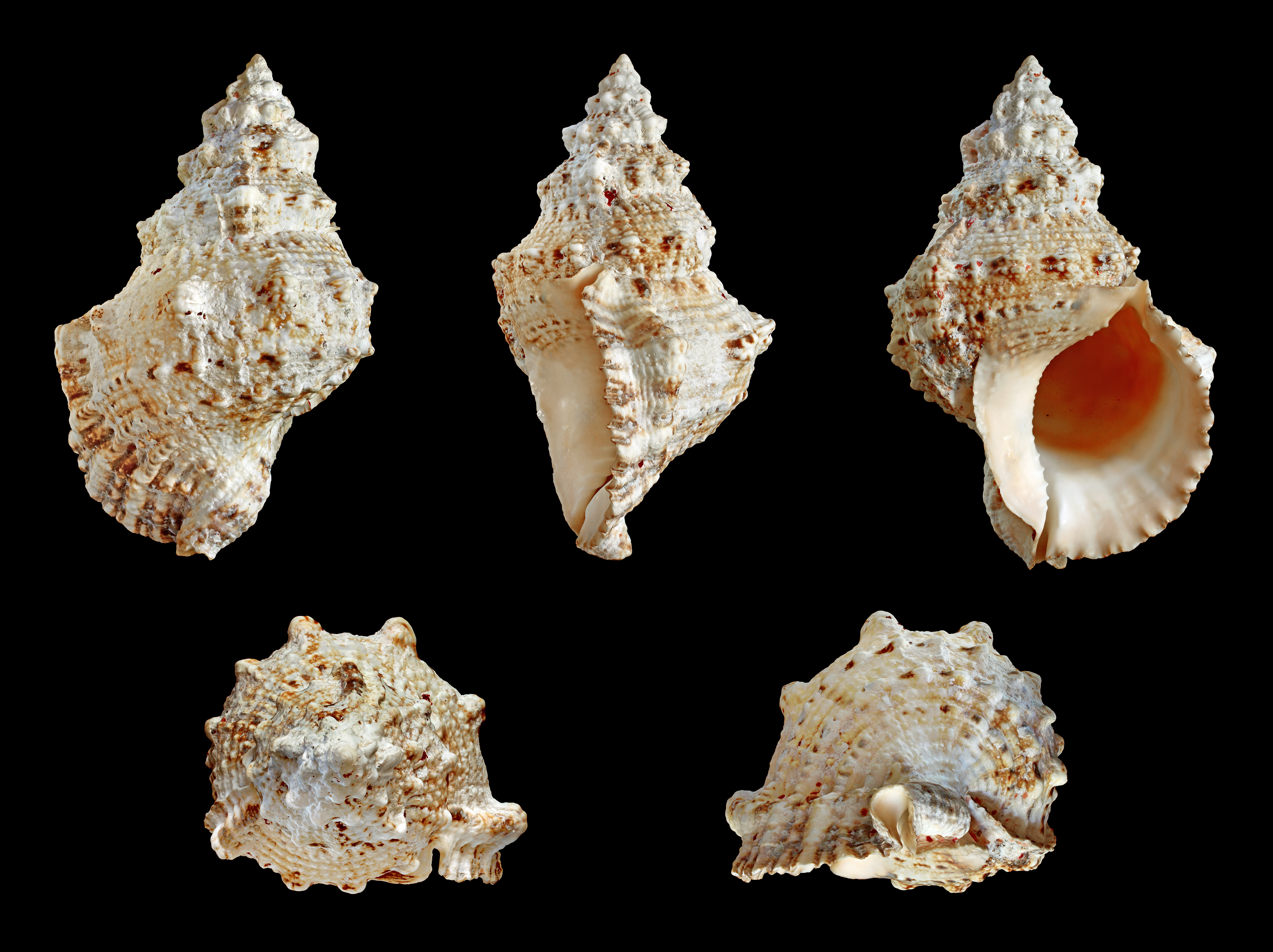
- Five views of a shell of Tutufa bubo

Scientific classification
- Kingdom: Animalia
- Phylum: Mollusca
- Class: Gastropoda
- Subclass: Caenogastropoda
- Order: Littorinimorpha
- Family: Bursidae
- Genus: Tutufa
- Species: T. bubo

Binomial name
- Tutufa bubo (Linnaeus, 1758)

Synonyms
- Bursa bubo Linnaeus; Bursa lampas C. Linnaeus, 1758; Bursa rubeta gigantea Smith, E.A., 1914; Murex rana var. bubo Linnaeus, 1758; Bursa bubo lissostoma

= Tutufa bubo =

Species of gastropod

Tutufa (Tutufa) bubo, common name the "giant frog snail" or "giant frog shell", is a species of extremely large sea snail, a marine gastropod mollusk in the family Bursidae, the frog shells.

== Description ==
The solid shell is large. The sculpture is coarse. The length of an adult shell varies between 100 mm and 337 mm.

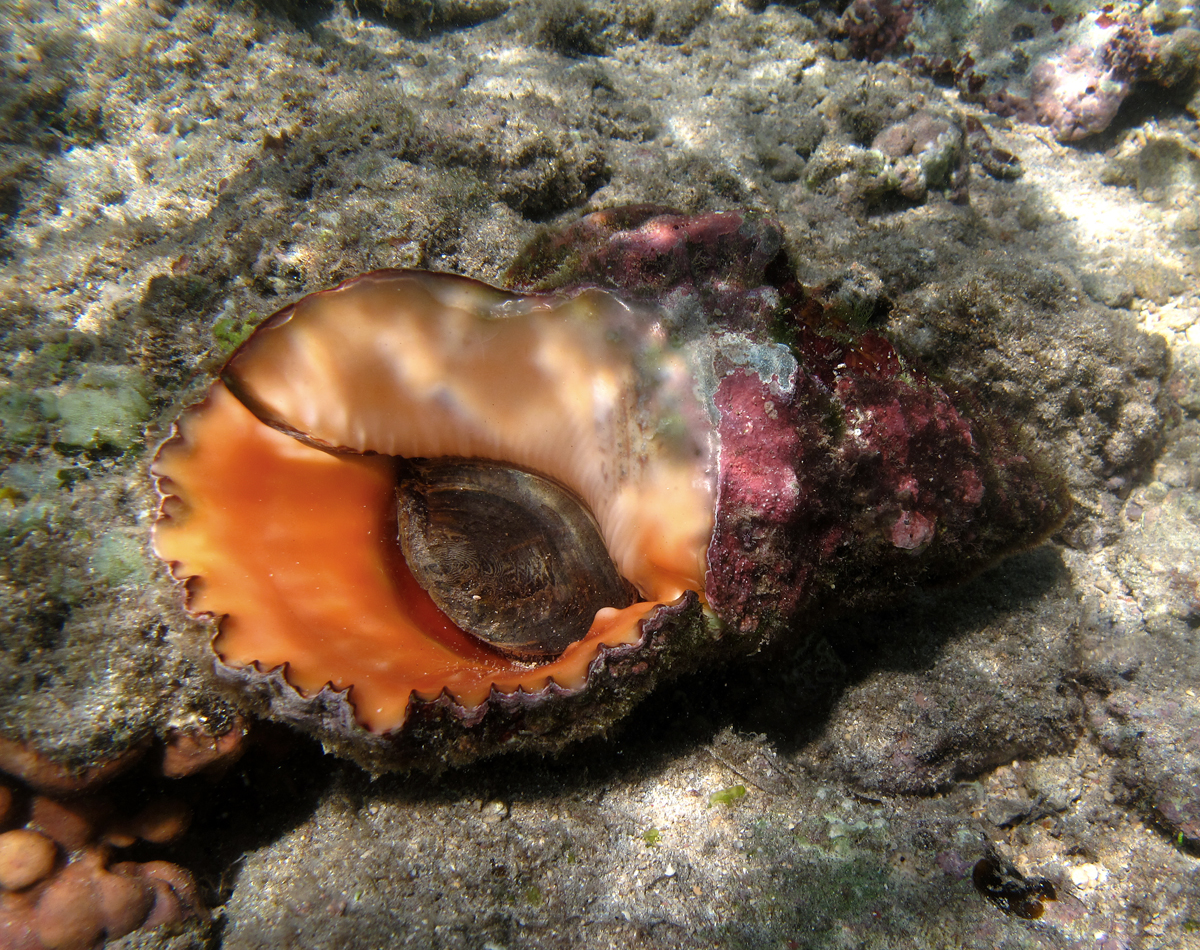

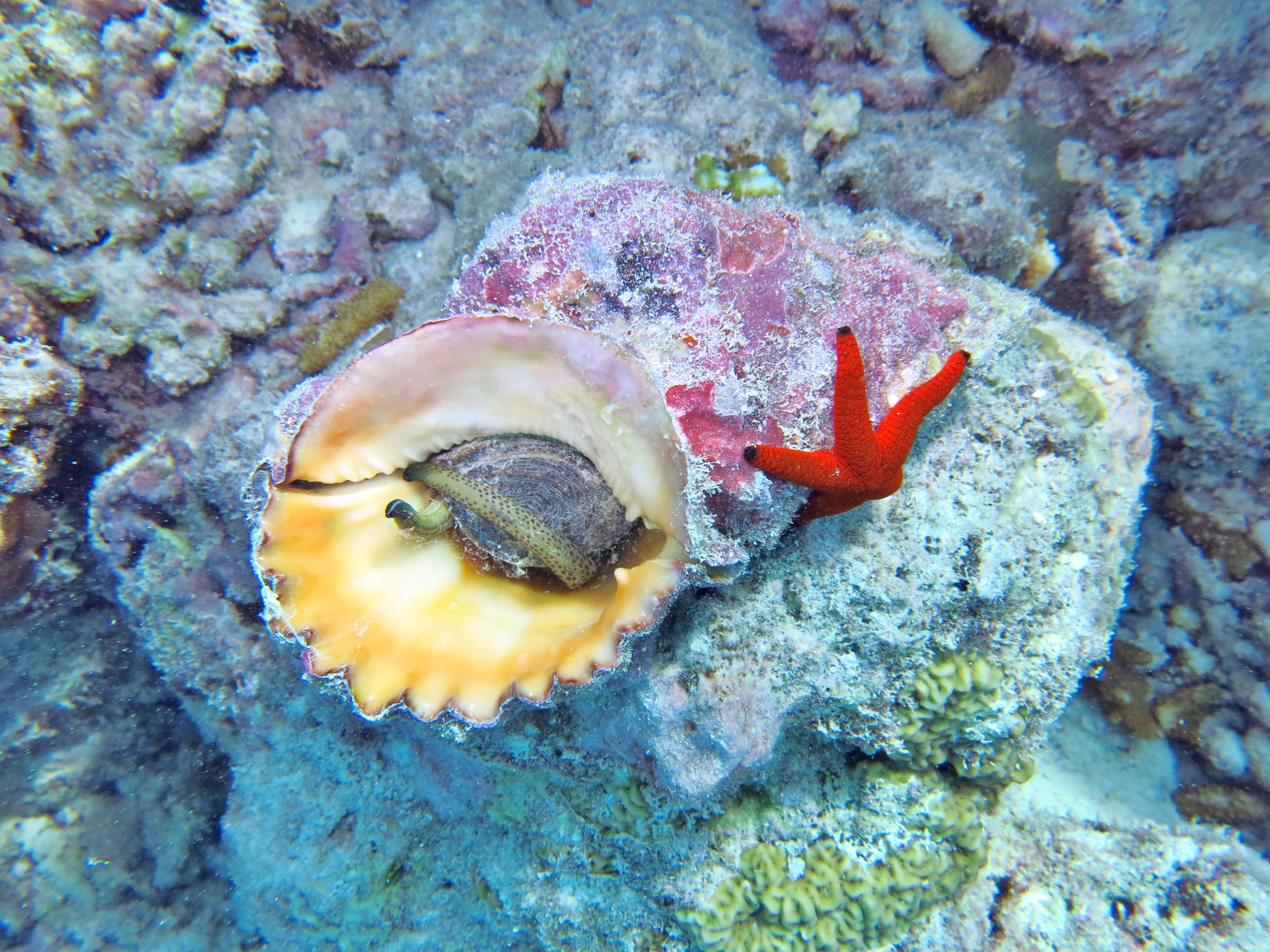

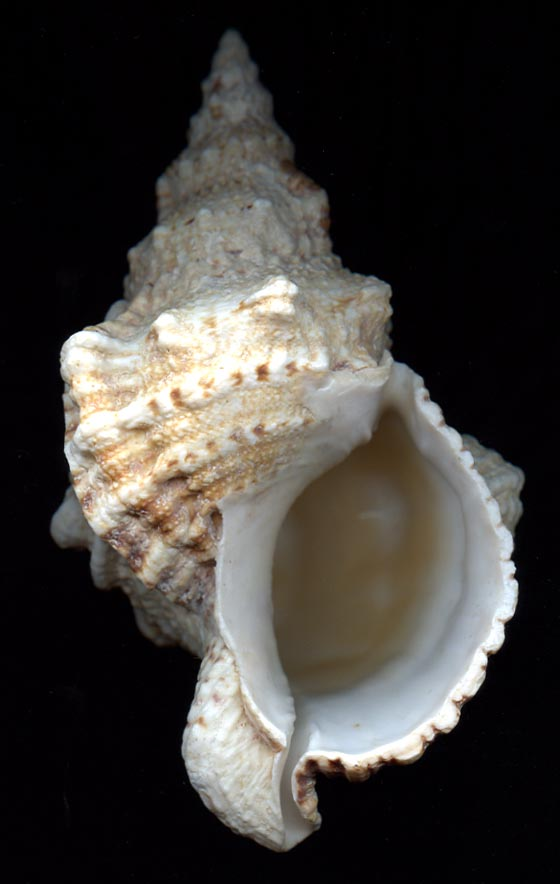

== Distribution ==
This frog shell is found in the tropics from low water to depths up to 180 m, mainly among rocks and coral. It occurs in the Red Sea, off the Philippines and in the Indo-Pacific Oceans.
