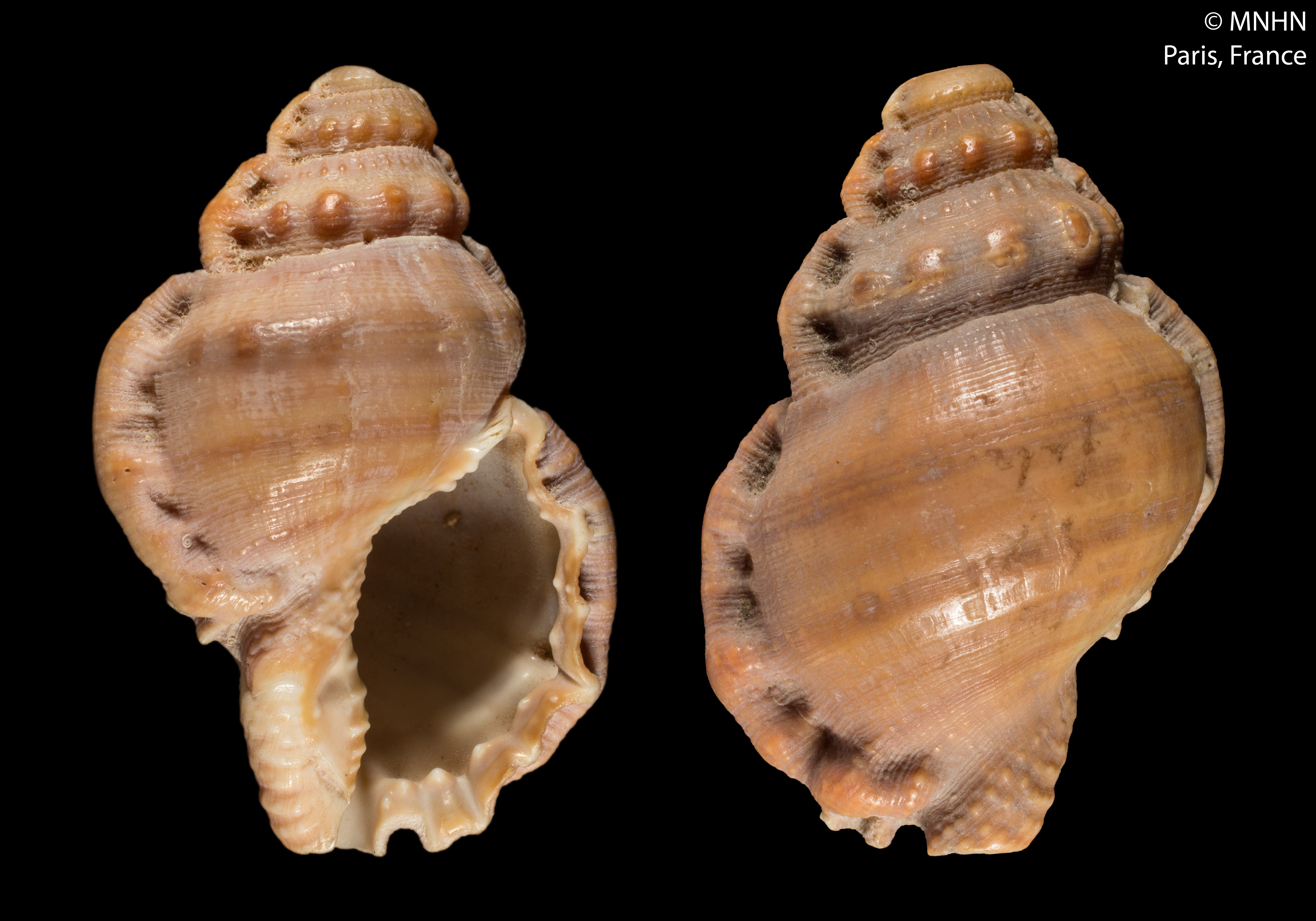
- Shell of Alanbeuella corrugata

Scientific classification
- Kingdom: Animalia
- Phylum: Mollusca
- Class: Gastropoda
- Subclass: Caenogastropoda
- Order: Littorinimorpha
- Superfamily: Tonnoidea
- Family: Bursidae
- Genus: Alanbeuella; M. T. Sanders, Merle, Laurin, Bonillo & Puillandre, 2020

Type species
- Biplex corrugata Perry, 1811

= Alanbeuella =

Genus of gastropods

Alanbeuella is a genus of sea snails, marine gastropod mollusks in the family Bursidae, the frog shells.

== Species ==
- Alanbeuella corrugata (Perry, 1811)
- † Alanbeuella victrix (Dall, 1916)
