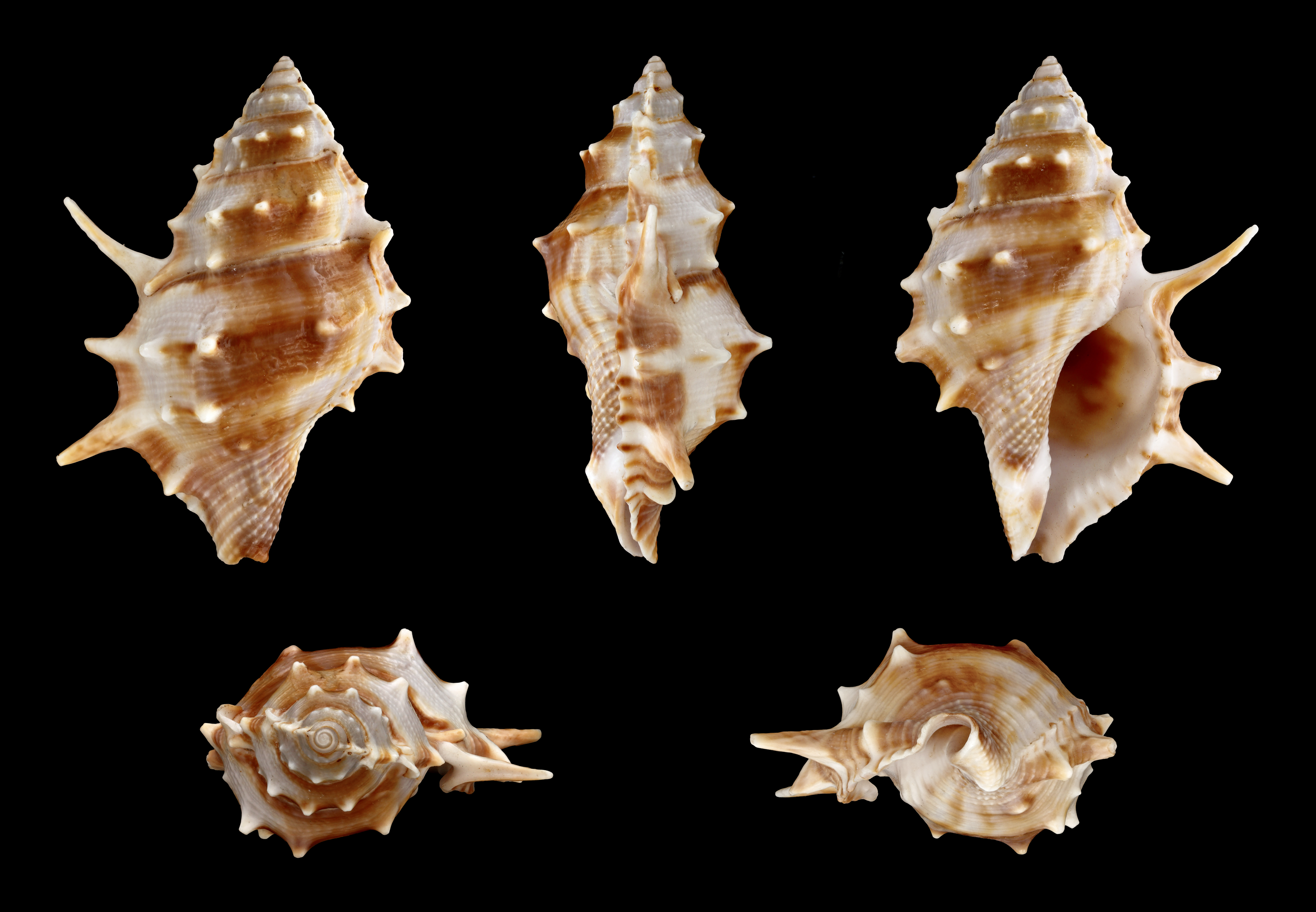

Scientific classification
- Kingdom: Animalia
- Phylum: Mollusca
- Class: Gastropoda
- Subclass: Caenogastropoda
- Order: Littorinimorpha
- Family: Bursidae
- Genus: Bufonaria
- Species: B. echinata

Binomial name
- Bufonaria echinata (Link, 1807)

Synonyms
- Tutufa (Tutufa) echinata Link, H.F., 1807; Biplex spinosa Perry, G., 1811; Bufonaria spinosa Schumacher, 1817; Bursa echinata (Link, 1807); Bursa suensonii Mörch, 1853; Bursa spinosa (Schumacher, 1817); Gyrineum echinatum Link, 1807 (basionym); Ranella spinosa Lamarck, 1816

= Bufonaria echinata =

Species of gastropod

Bufonaria echinata, the spiny frog shell, is a species of sea snail, a marine gastropod mollusk in the family Bursidae, the frog shells.

== Description ==
The shell size is between 50mm and 85 mm.

== Distribution ==
This species occurs in the Red Sea; off Madagascar, in the Indian Ocean, off the Philippines, and China.
