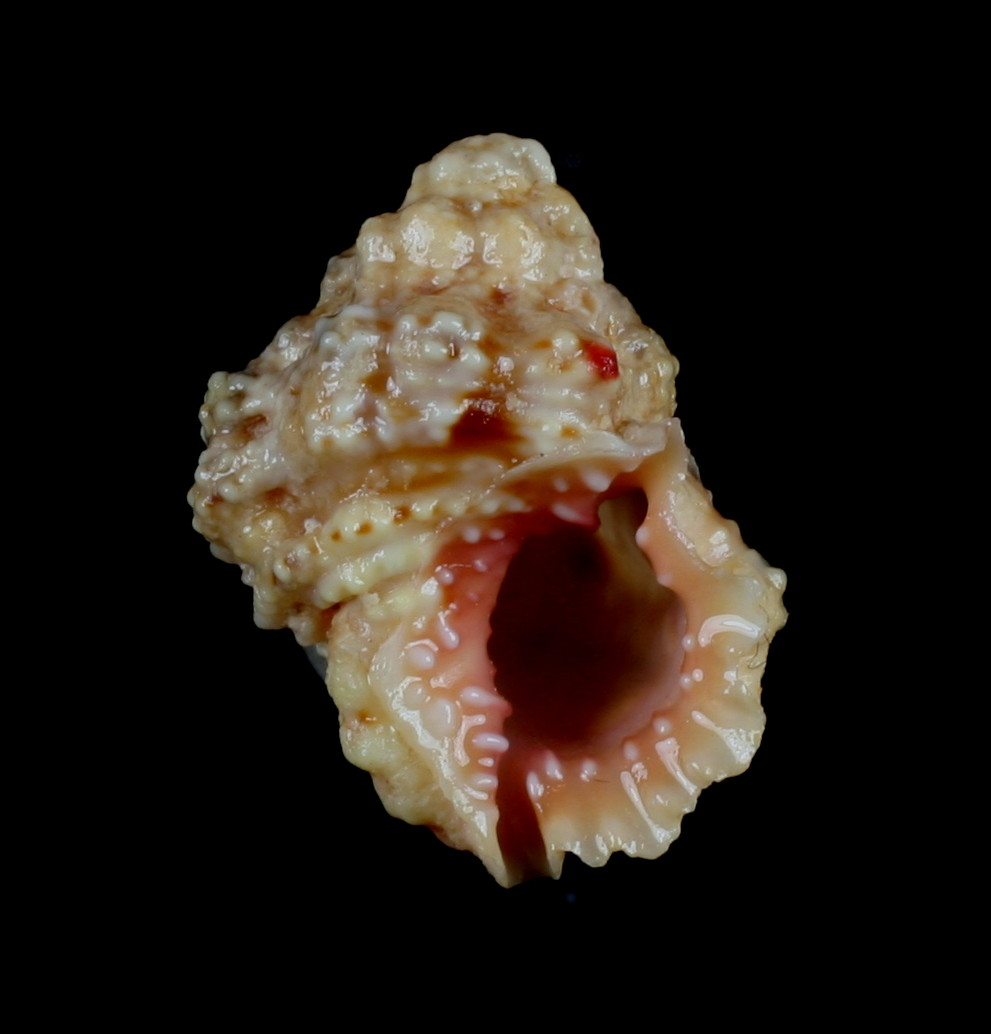
- Apertural view of Lampasopsis rhodostoma

Scientific classification
- Kingdom: Animalia
- Phylum: Mollusca
- Class: Gastropoda
- Subclass: Caenogastropoda
- Order: Littorinimorpha
- Superfamily: Tonnoidea
- Family: Bursidae
- Genus: Lampasopsis
- Species: L. rhodostoma

Binomial name
- Lampasopsis rhodostoma (G. B. Sowerby II, 1835)

Synonyms
- Bursa bergeri (Tapparone-Canefri, 1880); Bursa thomae (d'Orbigny, 1842); Bursa venustula (Reeve, 1844); Ranella bergeri sensu Sowerby Tapparone-Canefri, 1881; Ranella paulucciana Tapparone-Canefri, 1876; Ranella rhodostoma G.B. Sowerby II, 1835 (basionym); Ranella rhodostoma var. xantostoma Tapparone-Canefri, 1878; Ranella thomae d'Orbigny, 1842; Ranella venustula Reeve, 1844

= Lampasopsis rhodostoma =

Species of gastropod

Lampasopsis rhodostoma, common name the Wine-mouth frog shell, is a species of sea snail, a marine gastropod mollusk in the family Bursidae, the frog shells.

Lampasopsis rhodostoma thomae (d’Orbigny, 1847) is a recognized subspecies.

== Distribution ==
This marine species has a wide distribution. It is found in European waters, in the Atlantic Ocean off the Canary Islands, Madeira and the Cape Verdes, in the Caribbean Sea, the Gulf of Mexico and the Lesser Antilles, in the Red Sea, in the Indian Ocean off Aldabra, Chagos, and the Mascarene Basin; also off Australia (New South Wales, Northern Territory, Queensland, Western Australia).

== Description ==
The maximum recorded shell length of Lampasopsis rhodostoma is 35 mm.

== Habitat ==
Minimum recorded depth of Lampasopsis rhodostoma is 0 m. Maximum recorded depth is 250 m.
