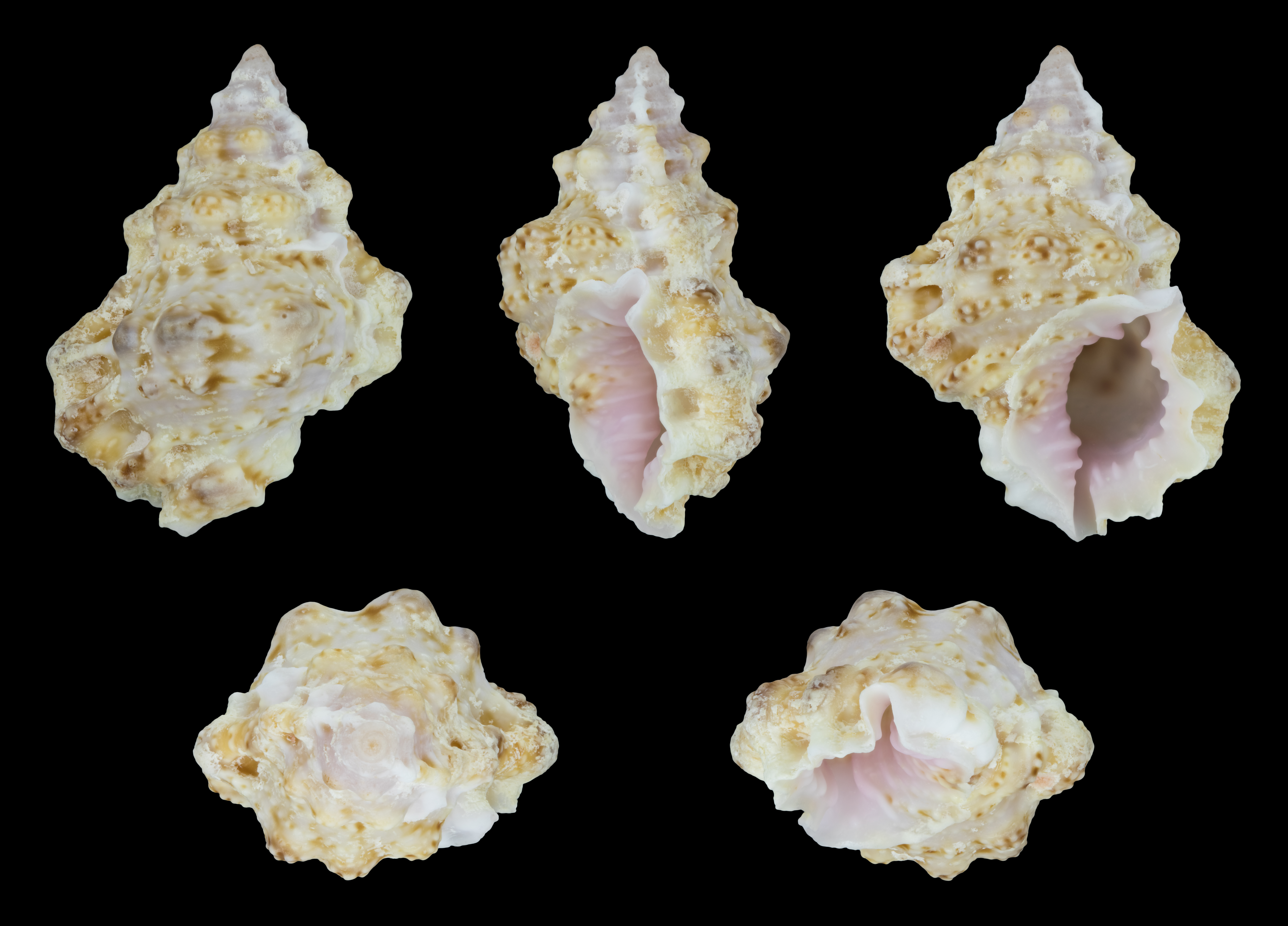

Scientific classification
- Kingdom: Animalia
- Phylum: Mollusca
- Class: Gastropoda
- Subclass: Caenogastropoda
- Order: Littorinimorpha
- Superfamily: Tonnoidea
- Family: Bursidae
- Genus: Lampasopsis
- Species: L. thomae

Binomial name
- Lampasopsis thomae (d'Orbigny, 1847)

Synonyms
- Bursa rhodostoma thomae (d'Orbigny, 1847); Bursa thomae (d'Orbigny, 1847); Ranella thomae d'Orbigny, 1847

= Lampasopsis thomae =

Species of gastropod

Lampasopsis thomae is a species of sea snail, a marine gastropod mollusk in the family Bursidae, the frog shells.
