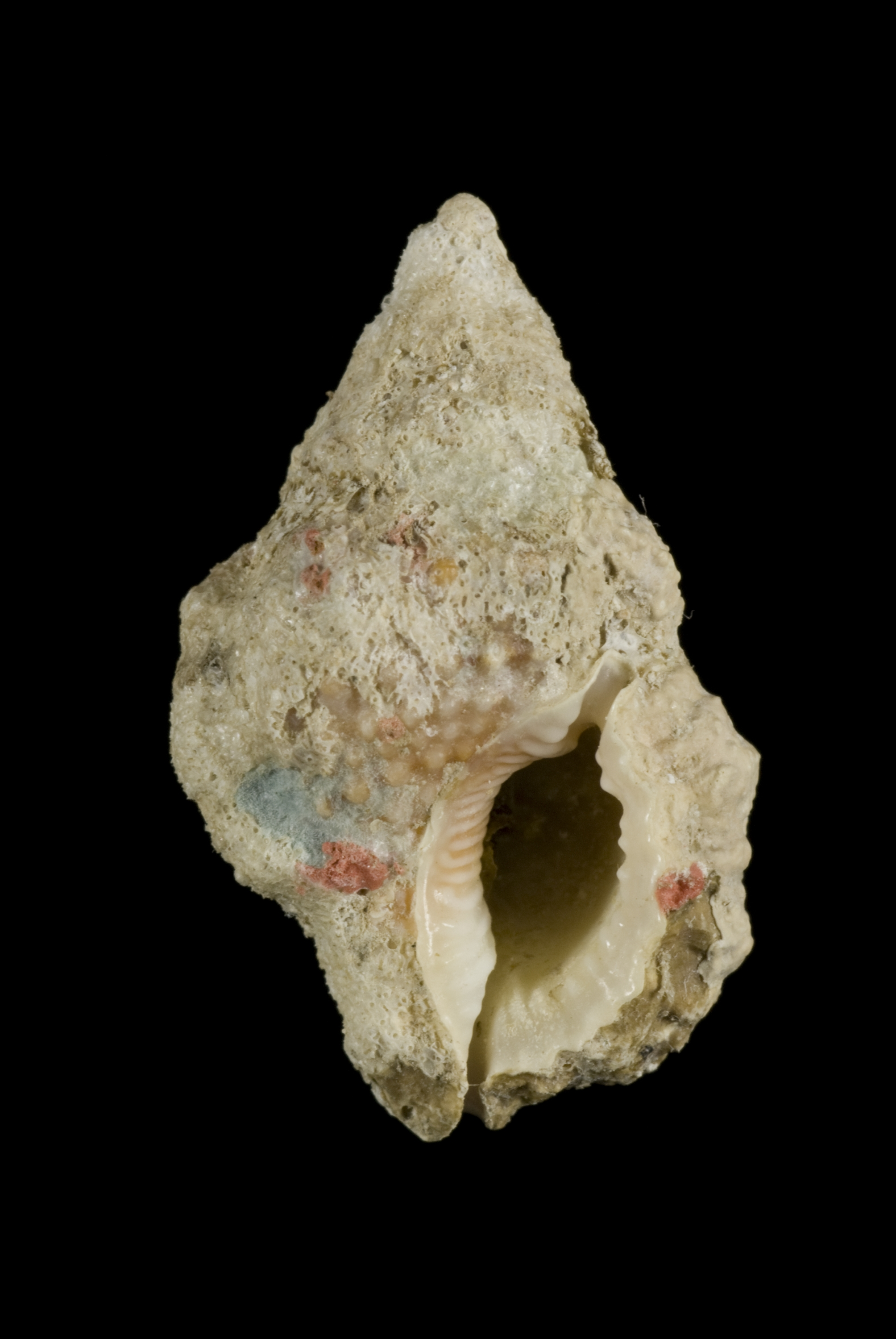
- Shell of Dulcerana affinis (specimen at MNHN, Paris)

Scientific classification
- Kingdom: Animalia
- Phylum: Mollusca
- Class: Gastropoda
- Subclass: Caenogastropoda
- Order: Littorinimorpha
- Superfamily: Tonnoidea
- Family: Bursidae
- Genus: Dulcerana; Oyama, 1964

Type species
- Ranella granifera Lamarck, 1816

Synonyms
- Colubrellina (Dulcerana) Oyama, 1964

= Dulcerana =

Genus of gastropods

Dulcerana is a genus of sea snails, marine gastropod mollusks in the family Bursidae, the frog shells.

== Species ==
- Dulcerana affinis (Broderip, 1833)
- Dulcerana cubaniana (d'Orbigny, 1847)
- Dulcerana elisabettae (Nappo, Pellegrini & Bonomolo, 2014)
- Dulcerana granularis (Röding, 1798)

Taxa inquirenda

- Dulcerana alfredensis (W. H. Turton, 1932)
- Dulcerana kowiensis (W. H. Turton, 1932)
