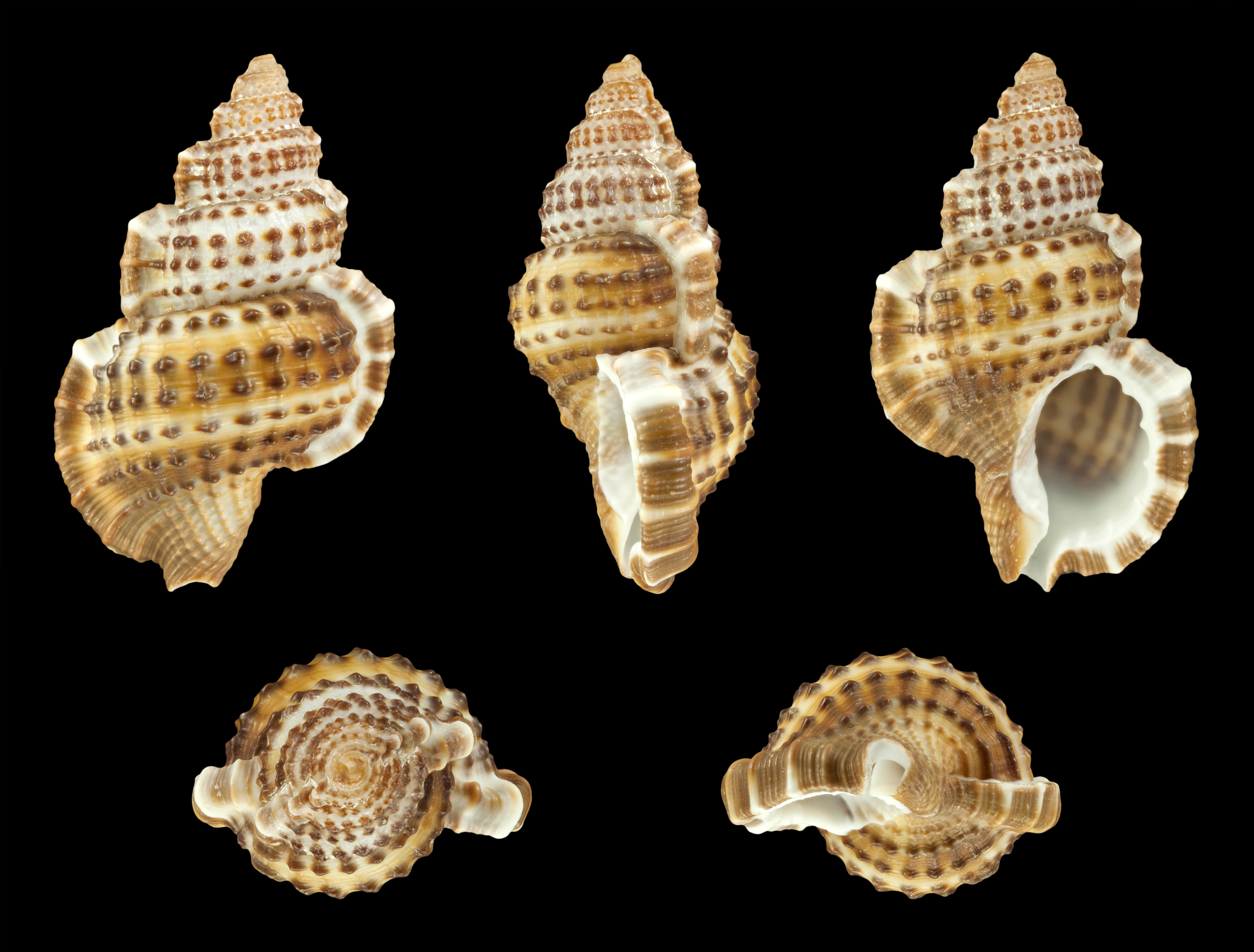
- A shell of Dulcerana granularis (Röding, 1798)

Scientific classification
- Kingdom: Animalia
- Phylum: Mollusca
- Class: Gastropoda
- Subclass: Caenogastropoda
- Order: Littorinimorpha
- Family: Bursidae
- Genus: Dulcerana
- Species: D. granularis

Binomial name
- Dulcerana granularis (Röding, 1798)

Synonyms
- Biplex rubicola Perry, 1811; Bursa affinis (Broderip, 1833); Bursa affinis granularis (Röding, 1798); Bursa alfredensis Turton, 1932; Bursa cumingiana Dunker, 1862; Bursa granifera (Lamarck, 1816); Bursa granularis f. affinis (Broderip, 1833); Bursa granularis f. alfredensis Turton, 1932; Bursa kowiensis Turton, 1932; Bursa livida Reeve, 1844; Colubrellina granularis (Röding, 1798); Ranella granifera Lamarck, 1816; Tritonium granulare Röding, 1798 (basionym); Tritonium jabick Röding, 1798

= Dulcerana granularis =

Species of gastropod

Dulcerana granularis, common name the granular frog shell, is a species of medium-sized sea snail, a marine gastropod mollusk in the family Bursidae, the frog shells.

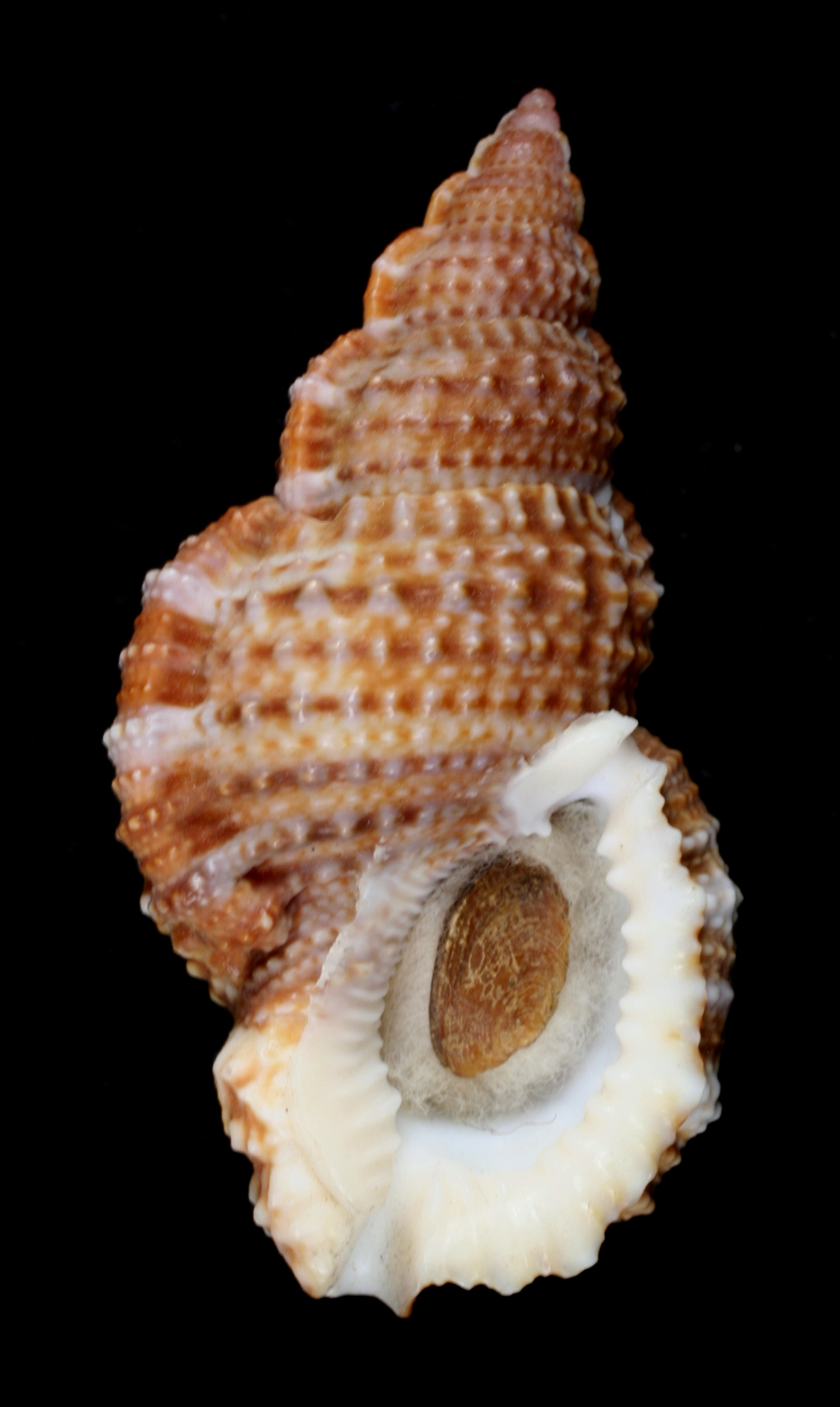
Apertural view of Dulcerana granularis (Röding, 1798) with operculum.

== Distribution ==
This marine species occurs in the Indo-West Pacific, off New Zealand, in the Caribbean Sea, the Gulf of Mexico and the Lesser Antilles. and Red Sea, and Arabian Sea.

== Description ==
The maximum recorded shell length is 85 mm.

== Habitat ==
Minimum recorded depth is 0 m. Maximum recorded depth is 256 m.
