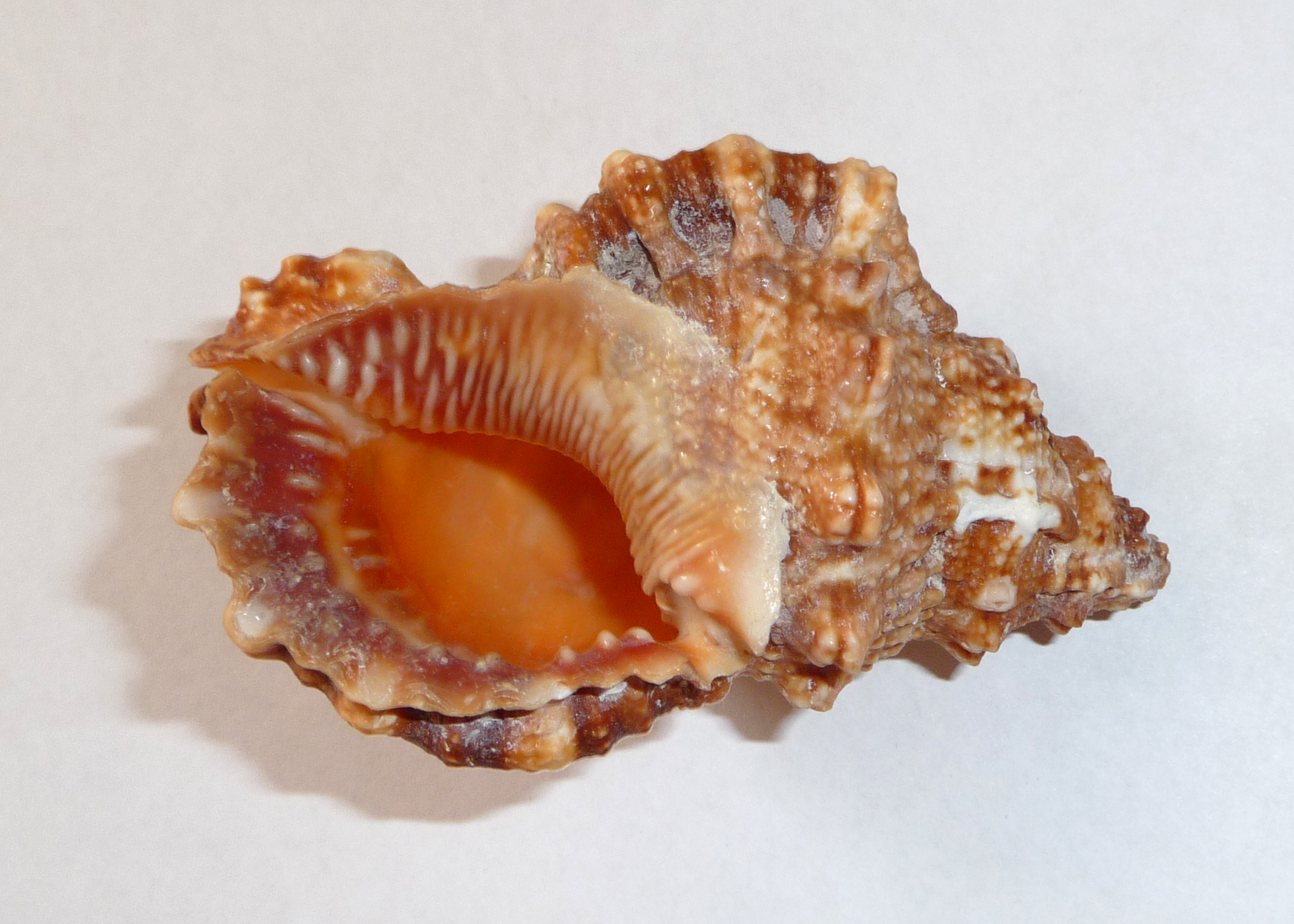
- Apertural view of a shell of Tutufa (Tutufella) rubeta

Scientific classification
- Kingdom: Animalia
- Phylum: Mollusca
- Class: Gastropoda
- Subclass: Caenogastropoda
- Order: Littorinimorpha
- Superfamily: Tonnoidea
- Family: Bursidae; Thiele, 1925

Genera
- See text

= Bursidae =

Family of gastropods

The Bursidae, common name "frog snails" or "frog shells", are a small taxonomic family of large sea snails, marine gastropod predatory snails in the clade Littorinimorpha.

== Distribution ==
Most species in this family occur on rocks or coral reefs in shallow waters of tropical oceans, including the Indo-Pacific, the Caribbean Sea, and other marginal warm seas, but they are also found in the Atlantic Ocean and the Mediterranean Sea. Only a few are found on sandy bottoms of deeper waters of the continental shelf.

== Shell description ==
The thick, ovate to slightly elongated shells are coarsely sculptured, resembling the triton shells of the Ranellidae. The intersection of the spiral ribs and the axial sculpture results in a strong nodulose pattern of more or less round knobs. This warty surface gave them their common name - frog shells. The outer varicose lip is dilated and shows a number of labial plicae, resulting in a toothed lip on the inside. The inner lip is calloused, showing transverse plicae.

The anterior and posterior canals are well developed. The siphonal canal at the anterior end is usually short. The anal canal at the posterior end is a deep slot. The strong axial varices are often in two continuous series per whorl, one down each side of the shell. The nucleus of the corneous operculum is situated either at the anterior end or the mid-inner margin. A periostracum (hairy covering of the outer shell) is usually absent or thin.

== Anatomy ==
The taenioglossate radula has seven teeth in each row: one central tooth, flanked on each side by one lateral and two marginal teeth. The central tooth is saddle-shaped, with long basal limbs, each bearing a cusp-like spur upon its face.

Their eyes are based at the base of their filiform tentacles. The foot is short and thick.

Fertilization is internal. The female snail lays her eggs enclosed in a jelly-like matrix that she sometimes broods with her foot. After hatching, the eggs become free-swimming larvae.

== Feeding habits ==
Frog shells are active predators, and appear to feed on bristle worms (Polychaeta) that they anaesthetize with acidic saliva through their extensible, distally flattened probosces.

== Genera ==
Genera in the family Bursidae include:

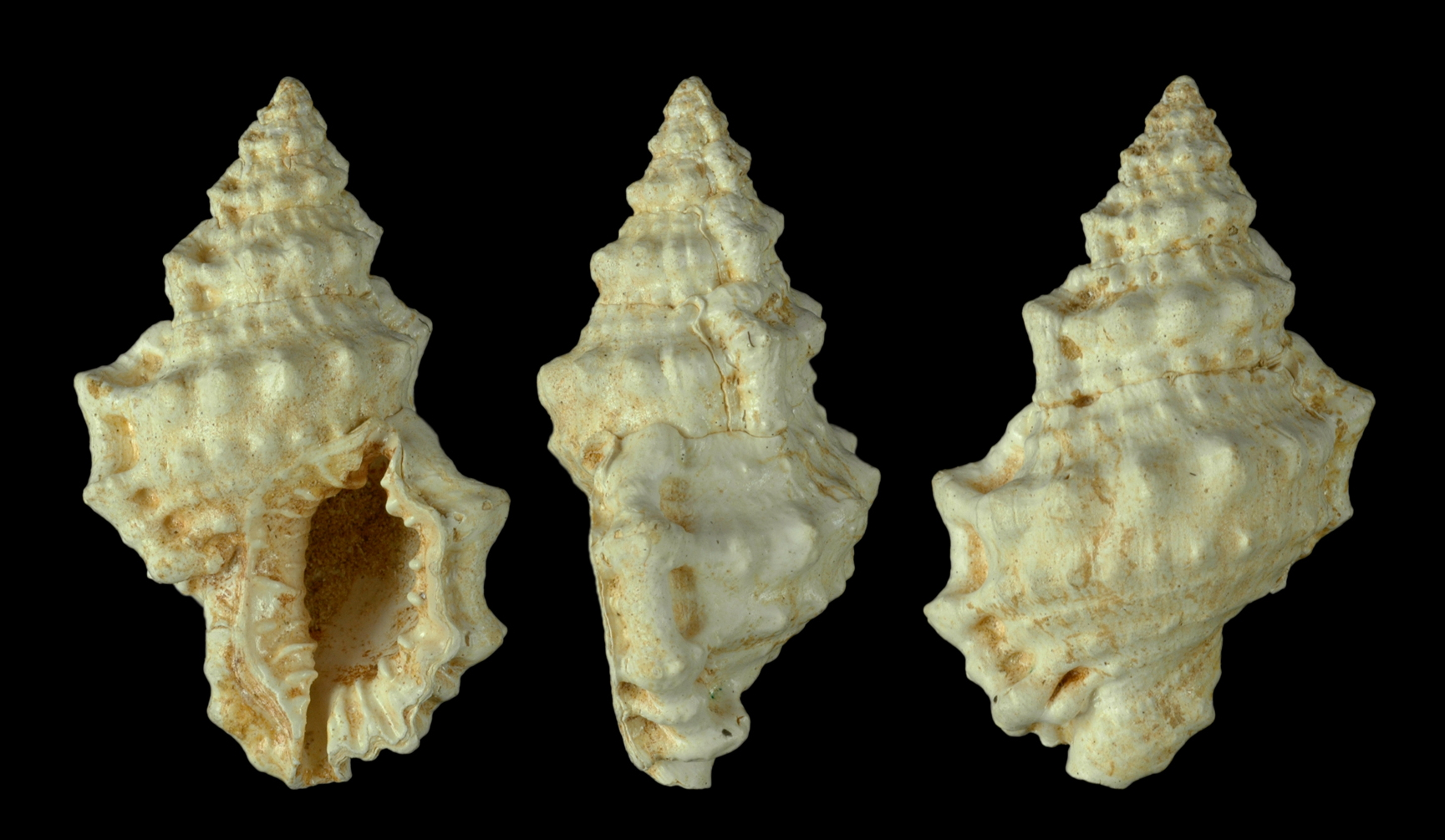
Shells of Aquitanobursa tuberosa (Grateloup, 1833) †; fossil, Aquitaine, France

- Alanbeuella M. T. Sanders, Merle, Laurin, Bonillo & Puillandre, 2020
- Annaperenna Iredale, 1936
- †Aquitanobursa M. T. Sanders, Merle & Puillandre, 2019
- Aspa H. Adams & A. Adams, 1853
- Bufonaria Schumacher, 1817
- Bursa Roding, 1798
- Bursina Oyama 1964 - assigned to Bursidae by Beu in 2005
- Colubrellina P. Fischer, 1884
- Crossata Jousseaume, 1881
- Dulcerana Oyama, 1964
- Korrigania M. T. Sanders, Merle, Laurin, Bonillo & Puillandre, 2020
- Lampasopsis Jousseaume, 1881
- Marsupina Dall, 1904
- † Olequahia Stewart, 1926
- † Olssonia M. T. Sanders, Merle & Puillandre, 2019
- Talisman de Folin, 1887
- Tritonoranella Oyama, 1964
- Tutufa Jousseaume, 1881

Genera brought into synonymy

- † Bechtelia Emerson & Hertlein, 1964: synonym of Marsupina Dall, 1904
- Buffo Montfort, 1810: synonym of Marsupina Dall, 1904
- Bufonariella Thiele, 1929: synonym of Talisman de Folin, 1887
- Chasmotheca Dall, 1904: synonym of Bufonaria Schumacher, 1817
- Columbraria: synonym of Bursa Röding, 1798 (incorrect subsequent spelling of Colubrellina ?)
- Lampadopsis P. Fischer, 1884: synonym of Lampasopsis Jousseaume, 1881 (unjustified emendation of Lampasopsis Jousseaume, 1881)
- Lampas Schumacher, 1817: synonym of Tutufa (Tutufella) Beu, 1981
- Pseudobursa Rovereto, 1899: synonym of Bursa Röding, 1798
- Tutufella Beu, 1981: synonym of Tutufa (Tutufella) Beu, 1981: represented as Tutufa Jousseaume, 1881 (Replacement name for Lampas Schumacher, preoccupied)

== Footnotes ==
- Bouchet P. & Rocroi J.-P. (2005) Classification and nomenclator of gastropod families. Malacologia 47(1–2): 1–397.
