= United States foreign policy in the Middle East =

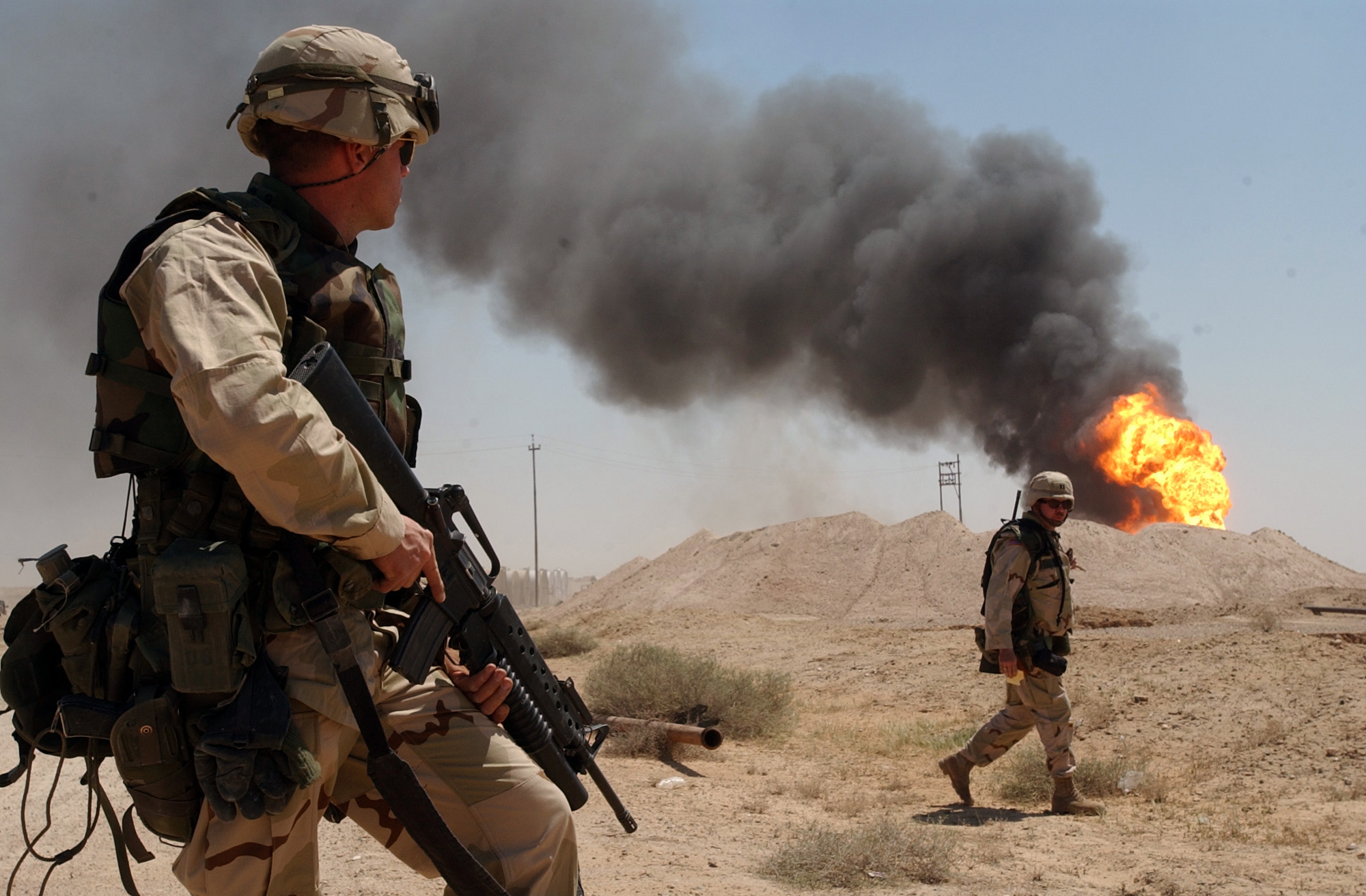
U.S. Marines on guard duty in April 2003 near a burning oil well in the Rumaila oil field of Basra, Iraq, following the 2003 U.S. invasion and during the Iraq War.

The foreign policy of the United States in the Middle East, a geopolitical region including parts of Africa and Asia, has among its primary considerations matters of petroleum politics, international trade, the War on terror, and the Israeli–Palestinian conflict.

The first major instances of US foreign policy in the region came with the American–Algerian War which lasted from 1785 through 1795, followed by the First Barbary War (1801–1805), shortly after the 1776 establishment of the United States as an independent sovereign state. US foreign policy then became much more expansive in the aftermath of World War II, with the goal of preventing the Soviet Union from gaining influence in the region during the Cold War. US foreign policy delivered extensive support in various forms to anti-communist and anti-Soviet regimes.

Among the top priorities for the U.S. with regard to this goal was its support for the State of Israel against its Soviet-backed neighboring Arab countries during the peak of the Arab–Israeli conflict. In the 1960s and 1970s, the U.S. also replaced the United Kingdom as the main security patron for Saudi Arabia and the other Arab states of the Persian Gulf, in order to ensure, among other goals, a stable flow of oil from the Persian Gulf.

As of 2023, the U.S. has diplomatic relations with every country in the Middle East except for Iran, with whom relations were severed after the 1979 Islamic Revolution.

American influence in the Greater Middle East has reduced in recent years, most significantly since the Arab Spring, yet is still substantial. Currently stated priorities of the U.S. government in the Middle East include involvement in the Israeli–Palestinian conflict and limiting the spread of weapons of mass destruction among regional states, particularly Iran.

== History ==
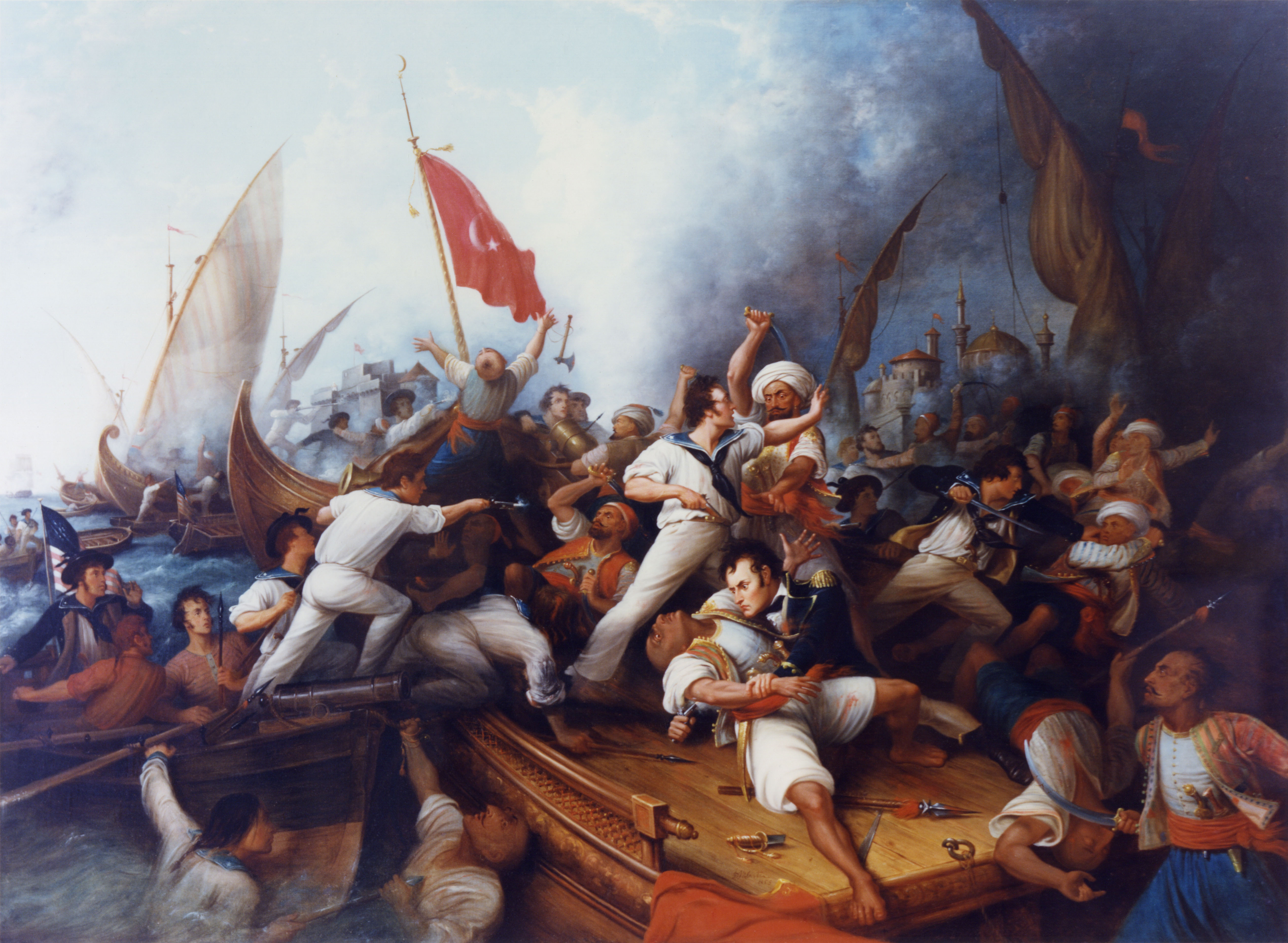
U.S. naval officer Stephen Decatur boarding a Tripolitan gunboat during the First Barbary War, 1804

The United States' relationship with the Middle East before World War I was limited, although commercial ties existed even in the early 19th century, as seen with the American–Algerian War. From 1801 to 1805, the U.S. fought against Ottoman Tripolitania during the Tripolitan War regarding tributary payment which president Thomas Jefferson refused to pay. In 1833, President Andrew Jackson established formal ties with the Sultan of Muscat and Oman. The Sultan saw the U.S. as a potential balance to Britain's overwhelming regional influence. In 1857, commercial relations opened between the U.S. and Persia, after Britain persuaded the Persian government not to ratify a similar agreement in 1851.

After defeating the Ottoman Empire in World War I, Britain and France took control of most of its former territories. They held mandates to do so from the League of Nations. The United States refused to take any mandates in the region and was "popular and respected throughout the Middle East". "Americans were seen as good people, untainted by the selfishness and duplicity associated with the Europeans."

American Christian missionaries brought modern medicine and set up educational institutions all over the Middle East, as an adjunct to their religious proselytizing. The United States also provided the Middle East with highly skilled petroleum engineers. Thus, there were some connections made between the United States and the Middle East before the Second World War.

Other examples of cooperation between the U.S. and the Middle East are the Red Line Agreement signed in 1928 and the Anglo-American Petroleum Agreement signed in 1944. Both of these agreements were legally binding and reflected an American interest in control of Middle Eastern energy resources, mainly oil, and reflected an American "security imperative to prevent the (re)emergence of a powerful regional rival". The Red Line Agreement had been "part of a network of agreements made in the 1920s to restrict the supply of petroleum and ensure that the major [mostly American] companies ... could control oil prices on world markets".

The Red Line agreement governed the development of Middle East oil for the next two decades. The Anglo-American Petroleum Agreement of 1944 was based on negotiations between the United States and Britain over controlling Middle Eastern oil. In a conversation with the British ambassador in 1944, American President Franklin D. Roosevelt summarized his view of how oil interests between the two countries should be divided:

Persian oil ... is yours. We share the oil of Iraq and Kuwait. As for Saudi Arabian oil, it's ours.

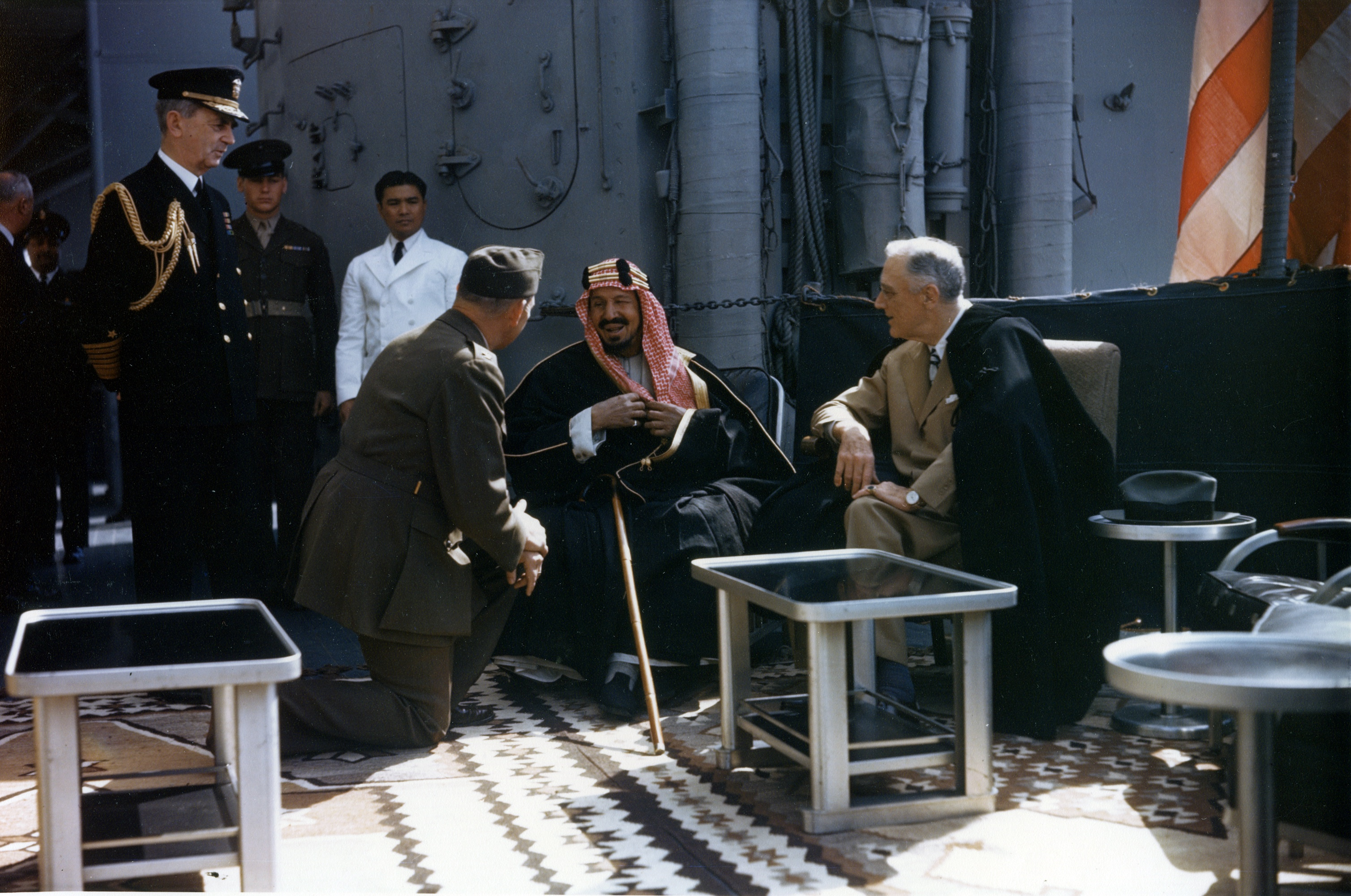
King Ibn Saud converses with President Franklin D. Roosevelt on board the USS Quincy, in February 1945.

On August 8, 1944, the Anglo-American Petroleum Agreement was signed, dividing Middle Eastern oil between the United States and Britain. Consequently, political scholar Fred H. Lawson remarks, by mid-1944, U.S. officials had buttressed the US position on the peninsula by concluding an Anglo-American Petroleum Agreement that protected "all valid concession contracts and lawfully acquired rights" belonging to the signatories and established a principle of "equal opportunity" in those areas where no concession had yet been assigned. Political scholar Irvine Anderson summarizes American interests in the Middle East in the late 19th century and the early 20th century noting that, "the most significant event of the period was the transition of the United States from the position of net exporter to one of net importer of petroleum."

By the end of the Second World War, according to linguist Noam Chomsky, Washington had come to consider the Middle East region as "the most strategically important area of the world." A U.S. State Department analysis concluded that Saudi Arabia's oil resources "constitute a stupendous source of strategic power, and one of the greatest material prizes in world history". In 1943, Roosevelt stated that "the defense of Saudi Arabia is vital to the defense of the United States." In 1980, President Jimmy Carter told a joint session of Congress that "An attempt by any outside force to gain control of the Persian Gulf region will be regarded as an assault on the vital interests of the United States of America."

Samir Amin argues that the strategic importance of Middle Eastern oil has historically been viewed as a critical source of global geopolitical leverage. National Security Advisor Zbigniew Brzezinski contended that given the dependence of Western Europe and East Asia on Middle Eastern oil, Soviet domination of the region would have enabled the Soviets to "blackmail" both regions, forcing them into diplomatic accommodations on favorable terms. Former Central Intelligence Agency (CIA) intelligence analyst Kenneth M. Pollack echoed this position, stating that the U.S. seeks more than just the continuous flow of Persian Gulf oil; it also aims to prevent any hostile actor from dominating the region's resources to build a power base or exert global "blackmail." In 1990, Secretary of Defense Dick Cheney testified before the Senate Armed Services Committee that anyone controlling the flow of Middle Eastern oil would possess a "stranglehold" over the U.S. economy, as well as "on that of most of the other nations of the world as well". Chomsky argued that by controlling Middle Eastern oil, the U.S. gains a strategic stranglehold that allows it to effectively "blackmail" industrial rivals; he identifies this strategy of keeping Europe and East Asia dependent on corporate America as "one of the main reasons the United States has been so interested in Middle Eastern oil." He added, "We didn't need the oil for ourselves;" until the early 1970s "North America led the world in oil production. But we do want to keep our hands on this lever of world power". He contends that a secondary objective is to ensure that "the flow of petrodollars should be largely funnelled to the U.S. through military purchases, construction projects, bank deposits, investment in Treasury securities, etc."

Following World War II, the region was going through great social, economic, and political changes and as a result, internally the Middle East was in turmoil. Politically, the Middle East was experiencing an upsurge in the popularity of nationalistic politics and an increase in the number of nationalistic political groups across the region, which was causing great trouble for the English and French colonial powers.

Historian Jack Watson says that "Europeans could not hold these lands indefinitely in the face of Arab nationalism". Watson continues that "by the end of 1946 Palestine was the last remaining mandate, but it posed a major problem". This nationalistic political trend clashed with American interests in the Middle East, which were, as Middle East scholar Louise Fawcett argues, "about the Soviet Union, access to oil and the project for a Jewish state in Palestine". Hence, Arabist Ambassador Raymond A. Hare described the Second World War, as "the great divide" in United States' relationship with the Middle East, because these three interests later served as a backdrop and reasoning for a great deal of American interventions in the Middle East, and came to be the cause of several future conflicts between the United States and the Middle East.

During the Cold War following World War II, the United States and the United Kingdom launched covert and overt campaigns to encourage and strengthen Islamic fundamentalists in the Middle East and southern Asia. These Islamic fundamentalists were seen as a hedge against potential expansion by the Soviet Union, and as a counterweight against nationalist and socialist movements that were seen as a threat to the interests of the Western nations.

In 2018, Mohammed bin Salman, the de facto ruler of Saudi Arabia, said that Saudi Arabia's international propagation of the Salafi movement and Wahhabism campaign was "rooted in the Cold War, when allies asked Saudi Arabia to use its resources to prevent inroads in Muslim countries by the Soviet Union."

As of 2024, the United States has approximately 45,000 troops in the region, including approximately 2,500 troops stationed in Iraq, 900 troops stationed in Syria, and others stationed in Bahrain, Djibouti, Jordan, Kuwait, Qatar, and the United Arab Emirates. About 15,000 of these troops were deployed to the region as part of a temporary surge after October 7, 2023, with the United States retaining about 30,000 troops until then. The troops are a fraction of the number the U.S. deployed in 2010, when it had more than 100,000 troops in Iraq, about 70,000 in Afghanistan and many more in neighboring countries. After 2015, the U.S. military presence in Iraq declined sharply; and all U.S. troops were withdrawn from Afghanistan in 2021.

== Israel ==
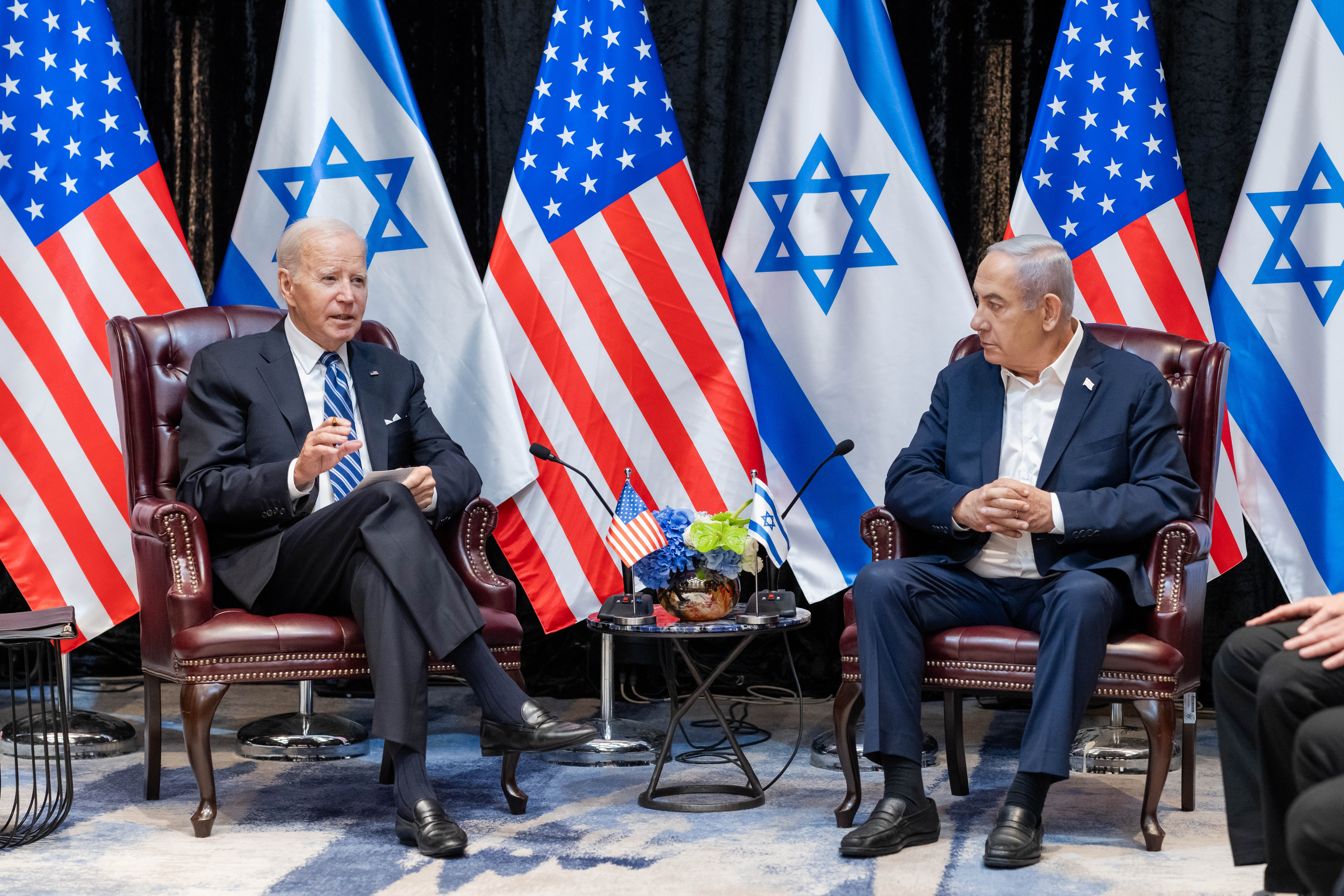
US President Joe Biden and Israeli Prime Minister Benjamin Netanyahu in Tel Aviv, Israel, October 2023

Israel is designated by the United States as a major non-NATO ally. Israel–United States relations are an essential factor in the United States foreign policy in the Middle East. Congress has placed significant importance on the maintenance of a close relationship with Israel. Analysts maintain that Israel is a strategic ally for the United States, and that relations with the former will strengthen the latter's influence in the Middle East. Former US senator Jesse Helms argued that the military foothold offered by Israel in the region alone justified the expense of American military aid. He referred to Israel as "America's aircraft carrier in the Middle East".

=== Formation of Israel (1948) ===
In 1947, the U.S. and the Truman administration, under domestic political pressure, pushed for a solution and resolution on the Arab–Israeli conflict, and in May 1948 the new state of Israel came into existence. This process was not without its fights and loss of lives. Nevertheless, "the first state to extend diplomatic recognition to Israel was the United States; the Soviet Union and several Western nations quickly followed suit. No Arab state, however, recognized Israel." The United States denounced the Arab invasion of former Mandatory Palestine that took place shortly after the Israeli Declaration of Independence.

=== Gaza war (2023–present) ===
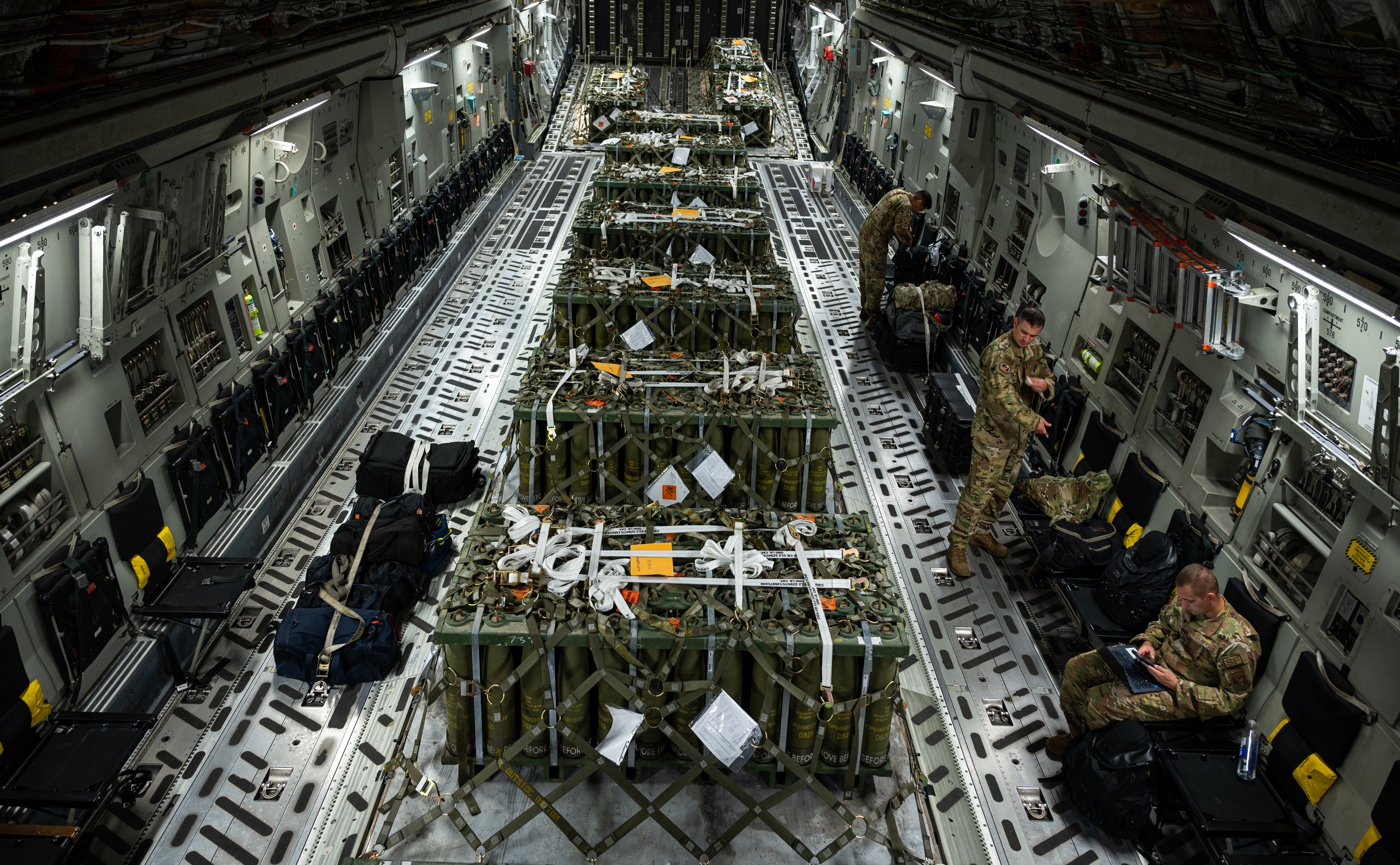
USAF airmen prepare for departure in a C-17 Globemaster III to supply Israel with munitions, Oct. 15, 2023, at Ramstein Air Base, Germany.

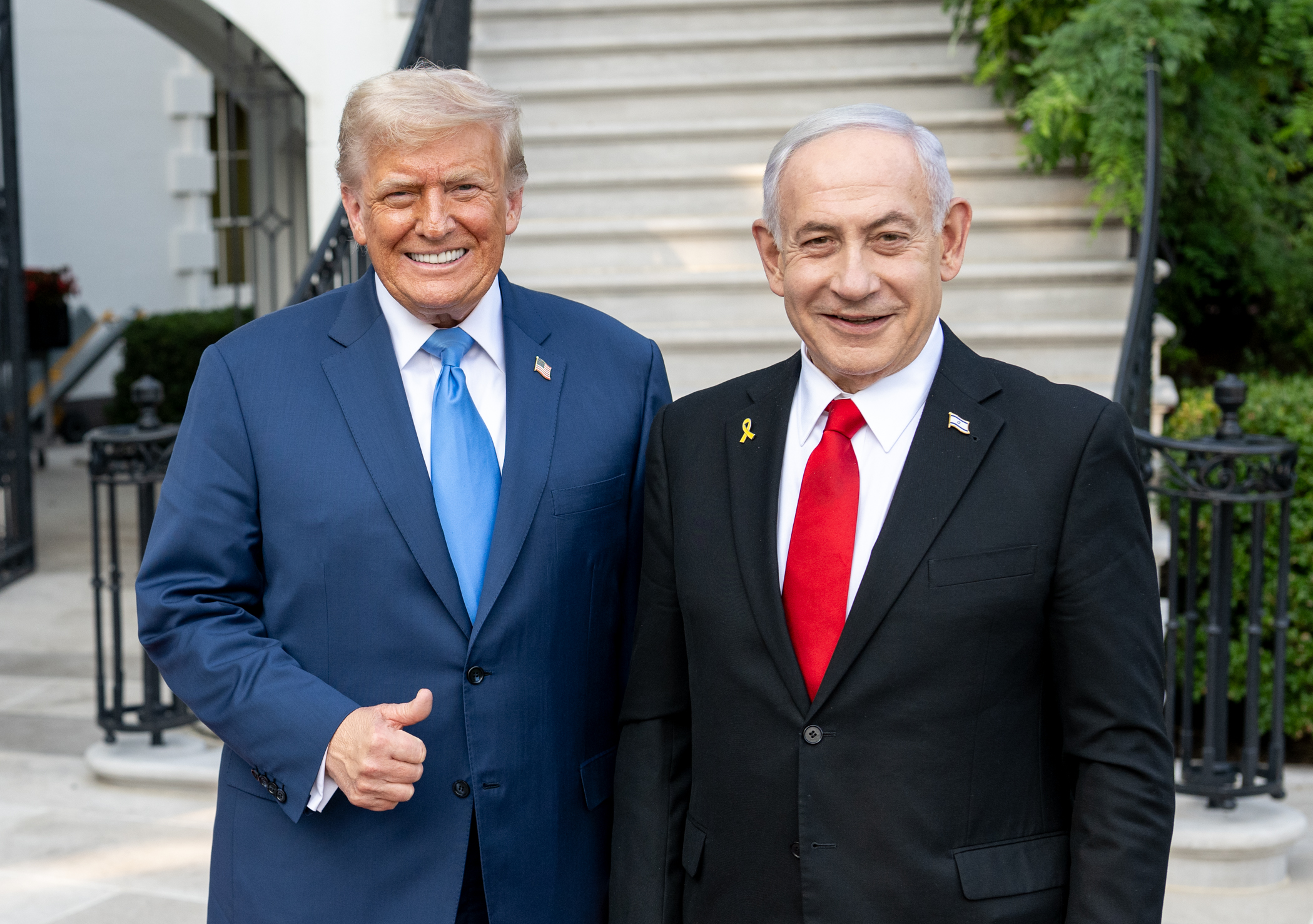
President Trump hosting Benjamin Netanyahu at the White House, July 2025

Following the October 7 attacks on October 7, 2023, the Biden administration requested ~$14 billion in aid from congress to provide military aid for Israel. Congress later approved a bill on February 13, 2024, the legislation included ~$19.3 billion; to support military operations ($14.1bn), air defense ($4bn), and the Iron Beam defense system ($1.2bn). The legislation also included $9.2 billion in humanitarian assistance for civilians in Gaza and the West Bank, along with those caught in warzones across the globe.

As a result of the ongoing support of Israel in the face of a humanitarian crisis in Gaza, the United States and President Joe Biden have faced scrutiny and backlash from some NGOs such as Human Rights Watch, Doctors Without Borders, and the Center for Constitutional Rights. The CCR has joined a lawsuit from Defense for Children International - Palestine against Biden's administration for allegedly "failing in his duty under international and US laws to prevent Israel committing alleged humanitarian crisis in Gaza."

The case was dismissed by the United States District Court for the Northern District of California in January 2024 as a non-justiciable political question. The dismissal was affirmed on appeal to the United States Court of Appeals for the Ninth Circuit in July 2024.

In the context of the 2023–present Gaza war, the United States has played a significant role by providing extensive military and financial support to Israel. Reports indicate that since October 2023, Washington has supplied more than $21 billion in assistance to sustain Israel’s war effort.

== Syrian coup d'état (1949) ==
Syria became an independent republic in 1946. The March 1949 Syrian coup d'état, led by Army Chief of Staff Husni al-Za'im, ended the initial period of civilian rule. Za'im met at least six times with CIA operatives in the months prior to the coup to discuss his plan to seize power. Za'im requested American funding or personnel, but it is not known whether this assistance was provided. Once in power, Za'im made several key decisions that benefited the United States. He approved the Trans-Arabian Pipeline (TAPLINE), an American project designed to transport Saudi Arabian oil to Mediterranean ports. Construction of TAPLINE had been delayed due to Syrian intransigence.

Za'im also improved relations with two American allies in the region: Israel and Turkey. He signed an armistice with Israel, formally ending the 1948 Arab–Israeli War. He renounced Syrian claims to Hatay Province, a major source of dispute between Syria and Turkey. Za'im also cracked down on local communists. However, Za'im's regime was short-lived. He was overthrown in August, just four and a half months after seizing power.

== Mosaddeq and the Shah of Iran (1953) ==
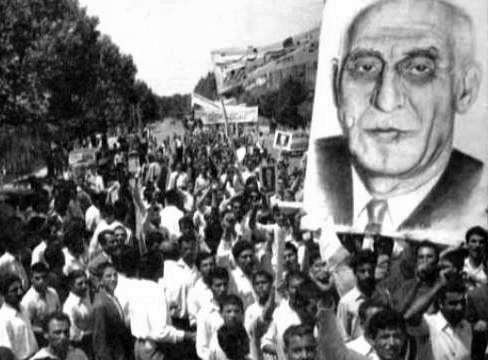
Supporters of Mohammed Mosaddeq in 1952

Opposed to foreign intervention in Iran and a keen nationalist, Mohammed Mosaddeq became the prime minister of Iran in 1951. When Mosaddeq was elected he nationalized the Iranian oil industry, where previously British holdings had generated great profits for Britain through the Anglo-Iranian Oil Company. Prior to the nationalization of Iranian oil, Mosaddeq cut all diplomatic ties with Britain.

The Shah of Iran, Mohammad Reza Pahlavi was opposed to the nationalization of Iranian oil as he feared this would result in an oil embargo, which would destroy Iran's economy and thus, the Shah was very concerned with the effect of Mosaddeq's policies on Iran. Equally worried were workers in the Iranian oil industry, when they experienced the economic effect of the sanctions on Iranian oil exports which Mosaddeq's policies had resulted in, and riots were happening across Iran.

Mohammad Reza Pahlavi asked Mosaddeq to resign, as was the Shah's constitutional right. Mosaddeq refused, which resulted in national uprisings. The Shah, fearing for his personal security, fled the country but nominated General Fazlollah Zahedi as the new Prime Minister. Although General Fazlollah Zahedi was a nationalist, he did not agree with the Mosaddeq's lenient attitude toward the communist Tudeh party, which the United States had also become increasingly concerned with, fearing Soviet influence spreading in the Middle East.

Therefore, in late 1952, the British government asked the U.S. administration for help with the removal of Mohammed Mosaddeq. President Harry S. Truman thought Mossadeq was a valuable bulwark against Soviet influence. Truman left office in January 1953. The new administration of Dwight Eisenhower shared British concern over Mossadeq. Allen Dulles, the director of the CIA, approved one million dollars on April 4, 1953, to be used "in any way that would bring about the fall of Mossadegh"

Consequently, after a failed attempt on August 15, "on August 19, 1953, General Fazlollah Zahedi succeeded [with the help of the United States and Britain] and Mossadegh was overthrown. The CIA covertly funneled five million dollars to General Zahedi's regime on August 21, 1953."

This CIA operation, often referred to as Operation Ajax and led by CIA officer Kermit Roosevelt Jr., ensured the return of the Shah on August 22, 1953.

== Suez Crisis (1956) ==
A President Eisenhower press conference about the crisis, August 9, 1956

Although accepting large sums of military aid from the United States in 1954, by 1956 Egyptian leader Nasser had grown tired of the American influence in the country. The involvement that the U.S. would take in Egyptian business and politics in return for aid, Nasser thought "smacked of colonialism." Indeed, as political scholar B.M. Bleckman argued in 1978, "Nasser had ambivalent feelings toward the United States. From 1952 to 1954 he was on close terms with U.S. officials and was viewed in Washington as a promising moderate Arab leader. The conclusion of an arms deal with the USSR in 1955, however, had cooled the relationship between Cairo and Washington considerably, and the Dulles-Eisenhower decision to withdraw the offer to finance the Aswan High Dam in mid-1956 was a further blow to the chances of maintaining friendly ties. Eisenhower's stand against the British, French and Israeli attack on Egypt in October 1956 created a momentary sense of gratitude on the part of Nasser, but the subsequent development of the Eisenhower Doctrine, so clearly aimed at 'containing' Nasserism, undermined what little goodwill existed toward the United States in Cairo." "The Suez Crisis of 1956 marked the demise of British power and its gradual replacement by the USA as the dominant power in the Middle East." The Eisenhower Doctrine became a manifestation of this process. "The general objective of the Eisenhower Doctrine, like that of the Truman Doctrine formulated ten years earlier, was the containment of Soviet expansion." Furthermore, when the Doctrine was finalized on March 9, 1957, it "essentially gave the president the latitude to intervene militarily in the Middle East ... without having to resort to Congress." indeed as, Middle East scholar Irene L. Gerdzier explains "that with the Eisenhower Doctrine the United States emerged "as the uncontested Western power ... in the Middle East."

=== Eisenhower Doctrine ===
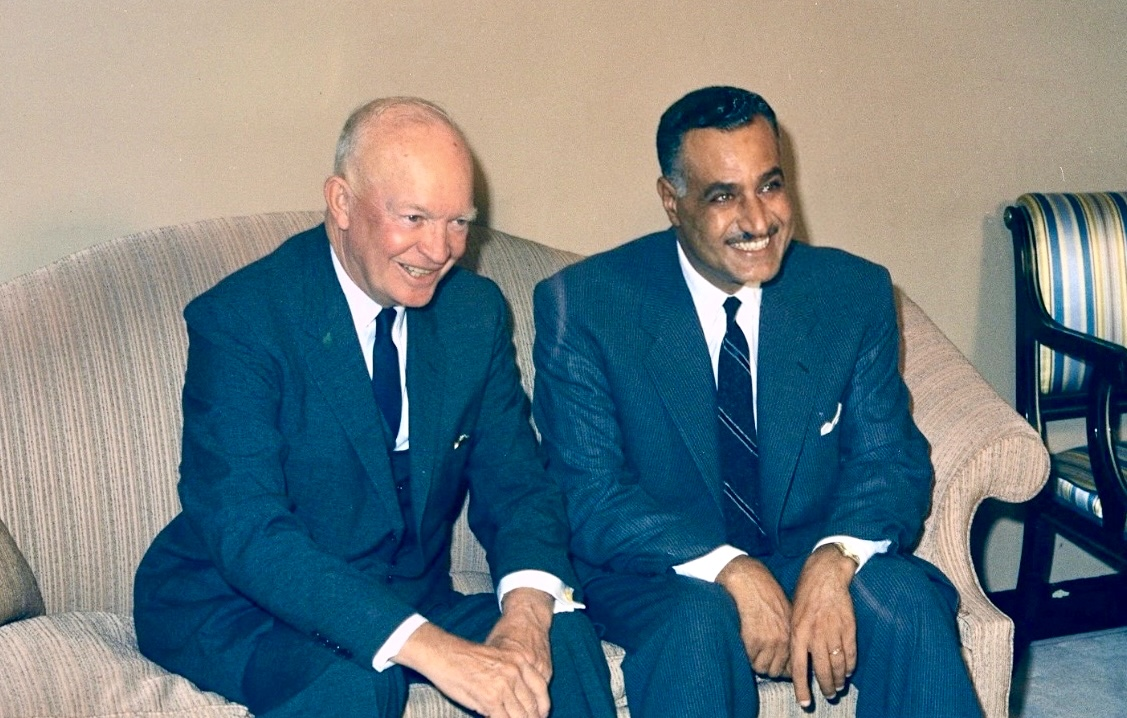
Nasser and Eisenhower in New York, 1960

In response to the power vacuum in the Middle East following the Suez Crisis, the Eisenhower administration developed a new policy designed to stabilize the region against Soviet threats or internal turmoil. Given the collapse of British prestige and the rise of Soviet interest in the region, the president informed Congress on January 5, 1957, that it was essential for the U.S. to accept new responsibilities for the security of the Middle East. Under the policy, known as the Eisenhower Doctrine, any Middle Eastern country could request American economic assistance or aid from U.S. military forces if it was being threatened by armed aggression. Though Eisenhower found it difficult to convince leading Arab states or Israel to endorse the doctrine, he applied the new doctrine by dispensing economic aid to shore up the Kingdom of Jordan, encouraging Syria's neighbors to consider military operations against it, and sending U.S. troops into Lebanon to prevent a radical revolution from sweeping over that country. The troops sent to Lebanon never saw any fighting, but the deployment marked the only time during Eisenhower's presidency when U.S. troops were sent abroad into a potential combat situation.

Though U.S. aid helped Lebanon and Jordan avoid revolution, the Eisenhower doctrine enhanced Nasser's prestige as the preeminent Arab nationalist. Partly as a result of the bungled U.S. intervention in Syria, Nasser established the short-lived United Arab Republic, a political union between Egypt and Syria. The U.S. also lost a sympathetic Middle Eastern government due to the 1958 Iraqi coup d'état, which saw King Faisal II replaced by General Abd al-Karim Qasim as the leader of Iraq.

=== Jordan ===
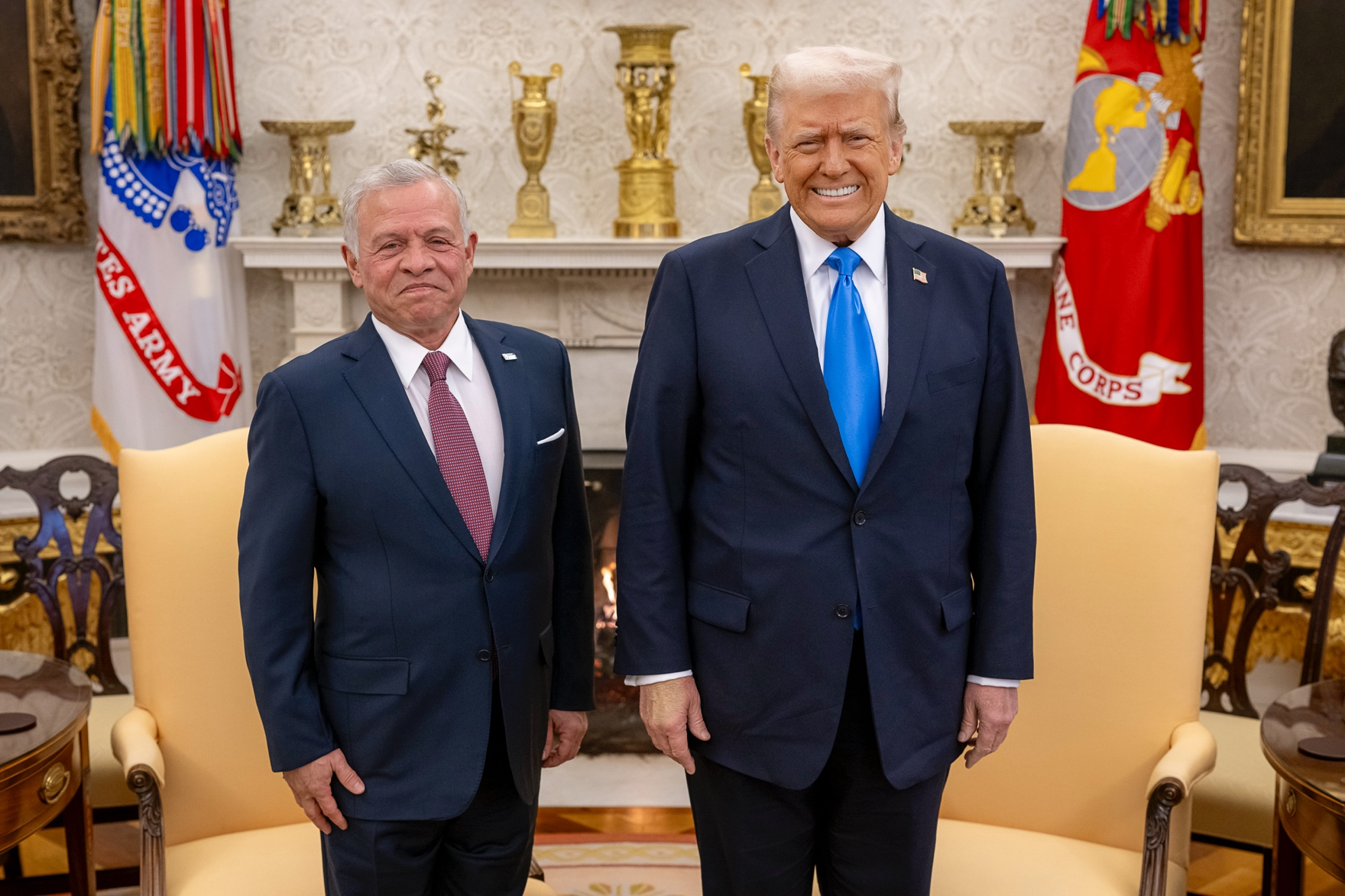
President Trump with King Abdullah II of Jordan, February 2025

Meanwhile, in Jordan nationalistic anti-government rioting broke out and the United States decided to send a battalion of marines to nearby Lebanon prepared to intervene in Jordan later that year. Douglas Little argues that Washington's decision to use the military resulted from a determination to support a beleaguered, conservative pro-Western regime in Lebanon, repel Nasser's pan-Arabism, and limit Soviet influence in the oil-rich region. However Little concludes that the unnecessary American action brought negative long-term consequences, notably the undermining of Lebanon's fragile, multi-ethnic political coalition and the alienation of Arab nationalism throughout the region. To keep the pro-American King Hussein of Jordan in power, the CIA sent millions of dollars a year of subsidies. In the mid-1950s the U.S. supported allies in Lebanon, Iraq, Turkey, and Saudi Arabia and sent fleets to be near Syria. However, 1958 was to become a difficult year in U.S. foreign policy; in 1958 Syria and Egypt were merged into the "United Arab Republic", anti-American and anti-government revolts started occurring in Lebanon, causing the Lebanese president Chamoun to ask America for help, and the very pro-American King Feisal the 2nd of Iraq was overthrown by a group of nationalistic military officers. It was quite "commonly believed that [Nasser] ... stirred up the unrest in Lebanon and, perhaps, had helped to plan the Iraqi revolution."

== Six-Day War (1967) and Black September (1970) ==
In June 1967 Israel fought with Egypt, Jordan, and Syria in the Six-Day War. As a result of the war, Israel captured the West Bank, Golan Heights, and the Sinai Peninsula. The U.S. supported Israel with weapons and continued to support Israel financially throughout the 1970s. On September 17, 1970, with U.S. and Israeli help, Jordanian troops attacked PLO guerrilla camps, while Jordan's U.S.-supplied air force dropped napalm from above. The U.S. deployed the aircraft carrier Independence and six destroyers off the coast of Lebanon and readied troops in Turkey to support the assault.

== Iran–Iraq War (1980–1988) ==
On September 22, 1980, Saddam Hussein's Iraq attacked Ayatollah Khomeini ruled Iran, starting bombing 10 military airfields.

=== Support for Iraq ===
Donald Rumsfeld meets Saddam Hussein, December 1983

Ted Koppel's ABC News broadcast of July 1992 points out the US cooperation with Iraq, by sending money, armaments, dual-use technology and if necessary, the provision of emergency action plans against Iran. According to revealed CIA files, the United States supported Hussein's Iraq even to the point of a US awareness of Iraqi use of chemical armaments. This violated the 1925 Geneva Protocol, which Iraq did not approve. Moreover, the US Defense Intelligence Agency provided Iraq with satellite positions of Iranian troops to help keep track of the enemies. American position in the war played "a secretly but unambiguously" pro-Iraq support.

A few scholars have argued the US gave a "green light" to Hussein's attack on Iran. Yet, considering now available US and Iraqi papers, the "green light" hypothesis is "more a myth than reality". US did not provide an initial encouragement to let the war begin as well as Hussein's attack was independent of the US.

U.S. government support for Iraq was not a secret and was frequently discussed in open sessions of the Senate and House of Representatives. On June 9, 1992, Ted Koppel reported on ABC's Nightline that the "Reagan/Bush administrations permitted—and frequently encouraged—the flow of money, agricultural credits, dual-use technology, chemicals, and weapons to Iraq."

American views toward Iraq were not enthusiastically supportive in its conflict with Iran, and activity in assistance was largely to prevent an Iranian victory. This was encapsulated by Henry Kissinger when he remarked, "It's a pity they both can't lose."

=== Support for Iran ===
US-Iran relations drastically changed since the Iranian 1979 revolution. It marked the fall of the Shah and its closeness with the Western world and the takeover of Khomeini with a return to Islamic law. In 1979 the US Embassy in Teheran was caught by protesters, and American civilians were taken hostages. In 1980, the US changed policy to allow Israel to sell American armament to Iran during the war. The deal between US and Israel was coordinated by the State Department Counselor, McFarlane, with US Secretary of State Alexander Haig Jr. and Israeli Prime Minister Menachem Begin agreeing to a 6 to 18 months period weapons' provision.

This support to Iran was first explained as a way to have back the American hostages. Yet, the hostages were delivered before the US supply of weapons to Iran. This armament provision lasts for more than the established period. This was later known as the Iran-Contra Affair publicly divulgated in November 1985. US supplied weapons to Iran through Israel, and the profit gained went to finance the Contra rebels, opponents to the Nicaragua Sandinista Front.

== Kuwait and the Gulf War (1991) ==
The 1991 Gulf War involved a coalition of 35 countries led by the United States against Iraq after it invaded Kuwait. Iraq had been an ally of the Soviet Union during the Cold War, resulting in little relation with the US. After Iraq threatened to invade Kuwait, the US said they would also protect their allies in the region against Iraq's invasion. After the invasion in 1990, economic sanctions are implemented when the US request a meeting of the United Nations Security Council and adopt Resolution 660.

The US rejected the proposal of the Iraqi army to leave Kuwait if a solution for Palestine is found. Military means are employed by the US in 1991, as Resolution 678 allows. Also, the coalition is created, with 73% of the armed force being American. The United States armed forces lead many attacks on the Iraqi army in several battles, through air strikes and land battles.

== Saudi Arabia ==
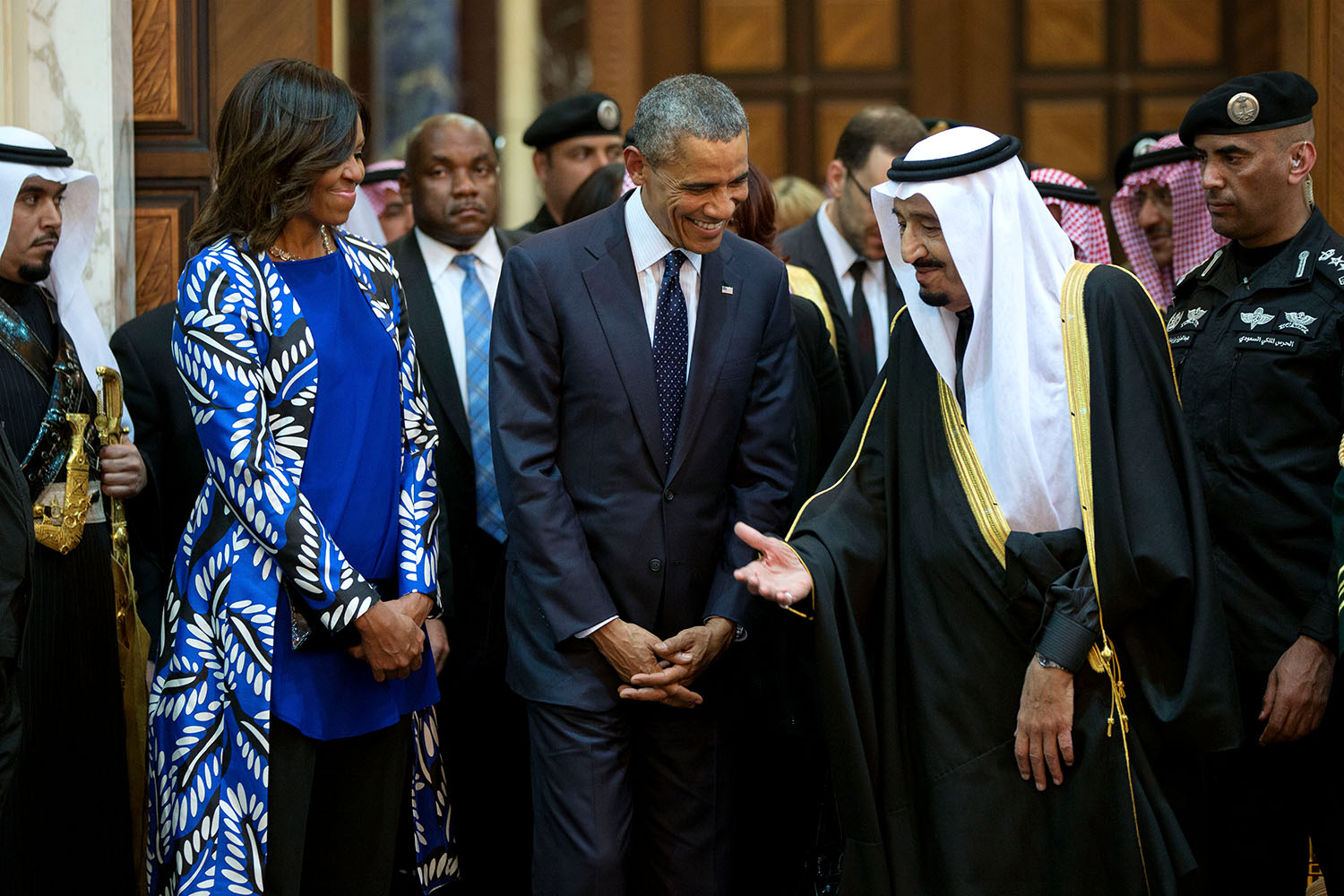
President Obama with King Salman of Saudi Arabia, Riyadh, January 2015

Saudi Arabia and the United States are strategic allies, but relations with the U.S. became strained following September 11 attacks.

Foreign policies of the US in Saudi Arabia started with the Quincy Agreement in 1945, in which the US agreed to provide Saudi Arabia with military security in exchange for secure access to supplies of oil. Military aid was provided to Saudi Arabia during the Gulf War, and almost 500,000 soldiers were sent to protect Saudi Arabia from Iraq.

In March 2015, President Barack Obama declared that he had authorized U.S. forces to provide logistical and intelligence support to the Saudis in their military intervention in Yemen, establishing a "Joint Planning Cell" with Saudi Arabia. The report by Human Rights Watch stated that US-made bombs were being used in attacks indiscriminately targeting civilians and violating the laws of war.

During his election campaign, Biden had pledged to make Saudi Arabia "a pariah". The Biden Administration emphasized its human rights policy as the key arbiter of the U.S. relationship with Saudi Arabia. Diplomatic relations hit a new low after a February 2021 U.S. intelligence report accused the crown prince of being directly involved in the assassination of Khashoggi.

During Russia's invasion of Ukraine, Saudi Arabia defied U.S. efforts to isolate Vladimir Putin and instead strengthened relations with Russia by coordinating to reduce oil output of OPEC countries in October 2022. This event triggered a strong backlash in the United States, with relations sinking to an "all-time low" and tensions exacerbating further.

American officials have criticized Saudi Arabia for actively enabling Russians to bypass US-EU sanctions and for undermining Western efforts to isolate Vladimir Putin. Saudi Arabia has also defied the United States' China containment policy. In December 2022, Saudi Arabia hosted Chinese leader Xi Jinping for a series of summits to sign a "comprehensive strategic partnership agreement" which elevated Sino-Arab relations.

=== Trade deals between the US and Saudi Arabia ===
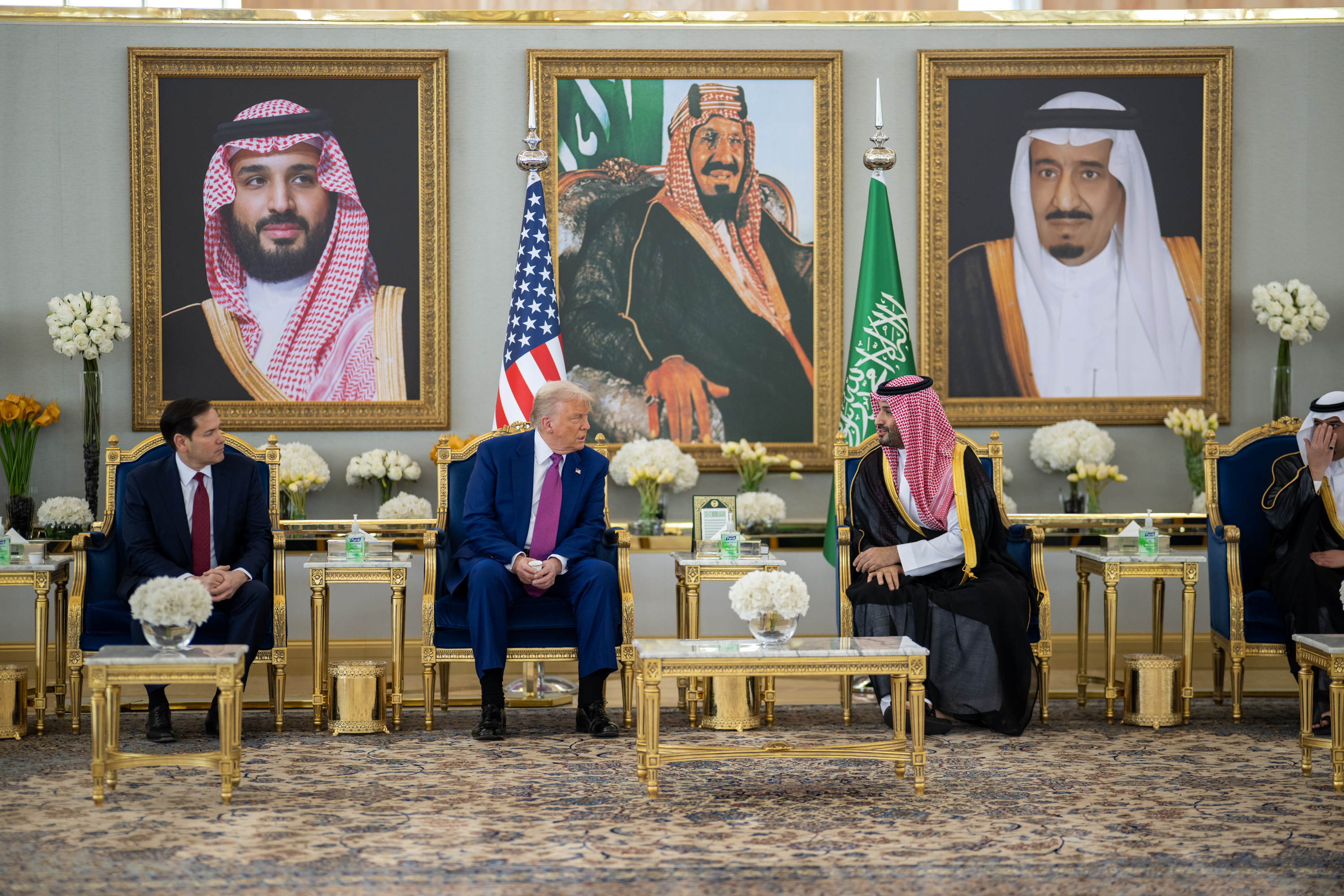
US President Donald Trump, Secretary of State Marco Rubio and Saudi Crown Prince Mohammed bin Salman in Riyadh, Saudi Arabia, May 2025

Both countries have an interest in fighting terrorism and are allies. In 2017, an agreement aiming to provide Saudi Arabia with $115 billion of weapons containing tanks, combat ships and missile defense systems was announced by President Donald Trump. In 2018, the Saudi Government had purchased over $14.5 billion of weapons to the US. Also in 2018, the Saudi-led coalition fighting terrorism in Yemen bombed a school bus killing 40 children, with a bomb provided by the United States. Many criticized the United States' support for Saudi intervention in Yemen which contributed to the killing of 10,000 children. In December 2018, the end of American assistance to Saudi Arabia's war in Yemen in voted by senators.

The lack of support from the US for the Saudi-led coalition interventions in Yemen stained the relationship of the two countries, causing Saudi Arabia to refuse the US's request of increasing oil production.

President Trump's four-day visit to the Middle East focused primarily on securing business deals and investments in the United States.

== Yemen ==
=== 20th century ===
The US established diplomatic relations with Yemen in 1947 when it became a member of the United Nations. The Yemen Arab Republic was created in 1962 and recognized by the US the same year. In 1967, the US recognized the People's Democratic Republic of Yemen. The 20th century's US policies in Yemen support the unification and are largely concentrated on humanitarian aid and some military operations. In the 1990s, the US developed a $42 million program in Yemen subsidizing agriculture, education and health. In return, the Yemeni government cooperated with US oil companies. US-Yemen relationship deteriorates when both take different sides during the Kuwait crisis.

=== 21st century ===
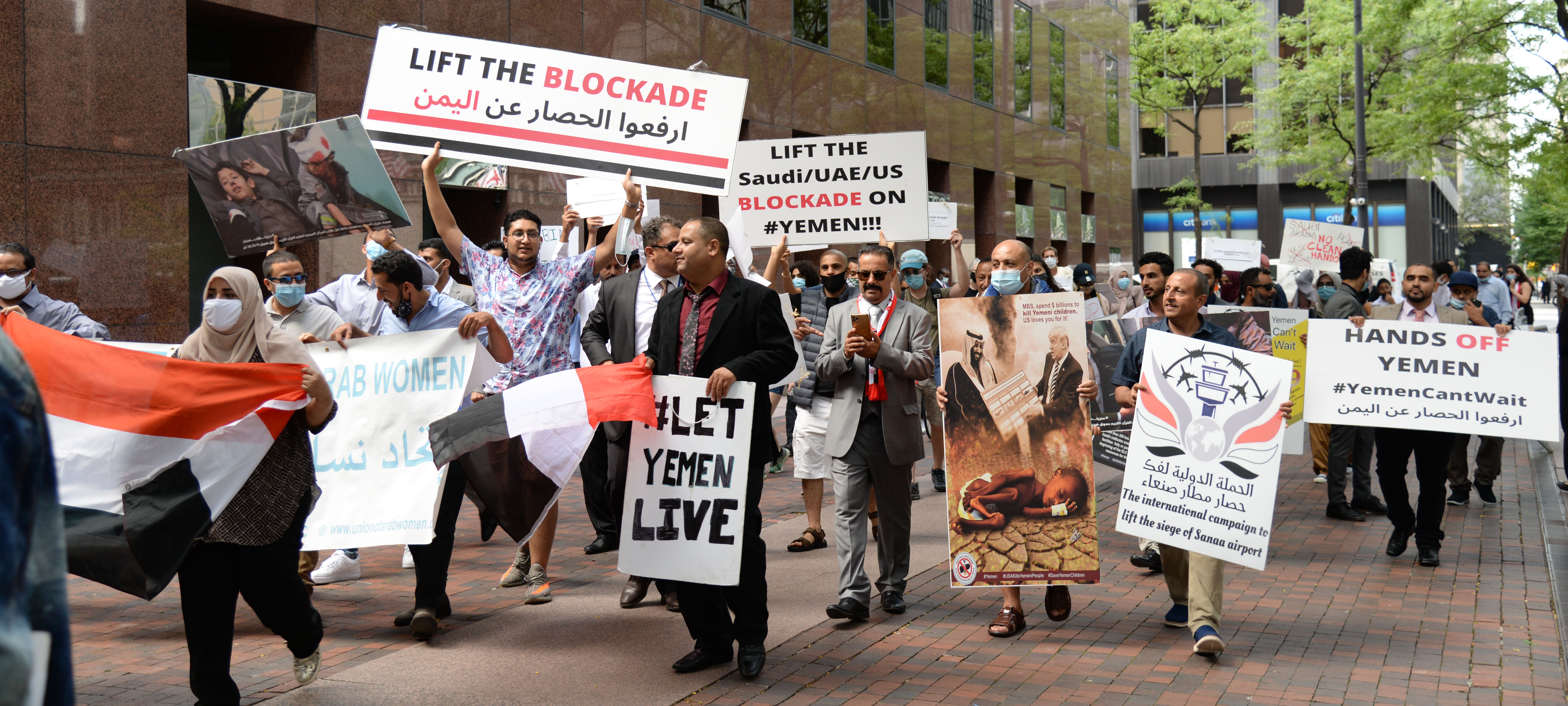
A March for Yemen in New York City, August 2020

Al-Qaeda's terrorist attacks in the United States have transformed American policies in Yemen. The US has engaged in many military actions against the terrorist group but also humanitarian help and cooperation with other actors. Also, the Yemeni government improved its cooperation in dismantling the terrorist group with the US government after this event.

Over the last decades, the US has responded to Yemen's humanitarian crisis caused by the war. The reported funding in the country from the US has increased this past decade from $115m in 2012 to almost a billion in 2019. It funds sectors like the supply of food security, health, education and protection. But the blockade of access to the country by the Saudi-led coalition, which has received support from the United States, prevents humanitarian aid to be fully applied.

Military policies in Yemen have increased since the replacement of the previous president Ali Abdullah Saleh by Abdrabbuh Mansur Hadi, far more cooperative in fighting terrorism in Yemen. Military policies are characterized by the training of the military by the US forces, the supply of weapons but also air strikes. The US also concluded an agreement with Saudi Arabia in 2015 which engages the US in supplying weapons to Saudi Arabia for counterterrorist actions in Yemen.

== Syria (2011–present) ==
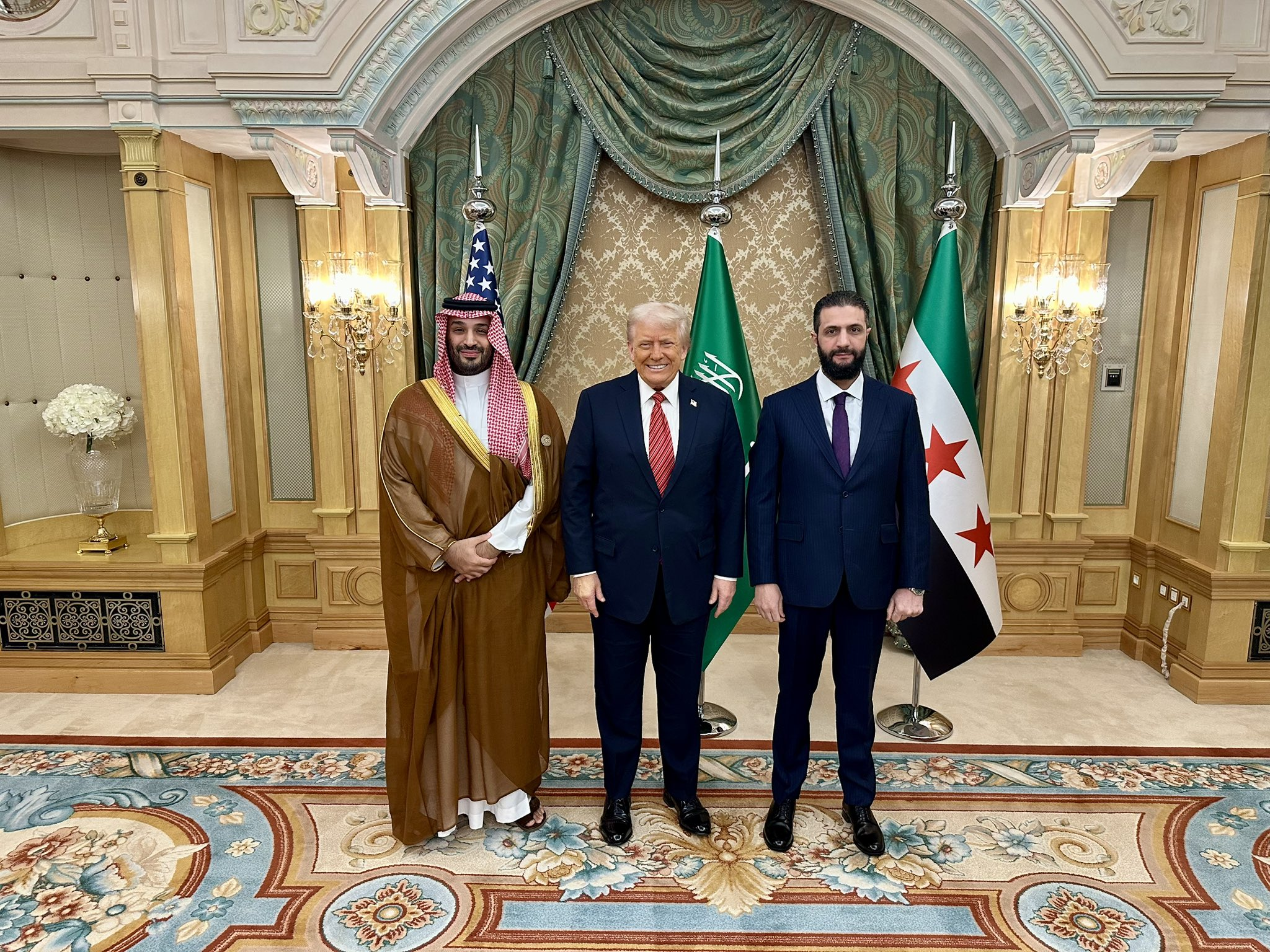
President Trump with Syrian President Ahmed al-Sharaa and Saudi Crown Prince Mohammed bin Salman in Riyadh, Saudi Arabia, May 2025

2011 saw several anti-governmental protests arising in many Arab countries, known as the Arab Spring. Syria opposed the Assad government through demonstrations which were put down fomenting a civil war.

US involvement in the Syrian civil war started under the Obama presidency, with the involvement of US troops in 2015. US troops' involvement continued under the Trump presidency, although Trump stated on several occasions that he did not want "boots on the ground" in Syria for much longer, asking the army to retire altogether, which never happened. US continued to lead an alliance of up to 74 countries to fight against ISIS terrorist organization, but also with peacekeeping and patrolling of oilfields missions.

The situation became more complicated in 2019, after Turkey struck an agreement with Russia, whose army also got directly involved. The US and the Western coalition got involved in multiple fights, mostly on the side of the Kurdish led YPG and SDF liberation army, causing therefore tensions with Turkey, which fundamentally never stopped fighting Kurds in Syria.

Trump's presidency has not made things any easier for US troops deployed in Syria, moving from showing little interest to showing interest in the oilfields located in the North-Eastern province of Syria, to finally showing signs of appropriating a victory that did not really happen. But the situation remains far from clear for the US army in Syria with its presence continuing under the Biden presidency, with focus on military operations and airstrikes shifting toward the East, to better fight Iran supported militias.

== Turkey ==
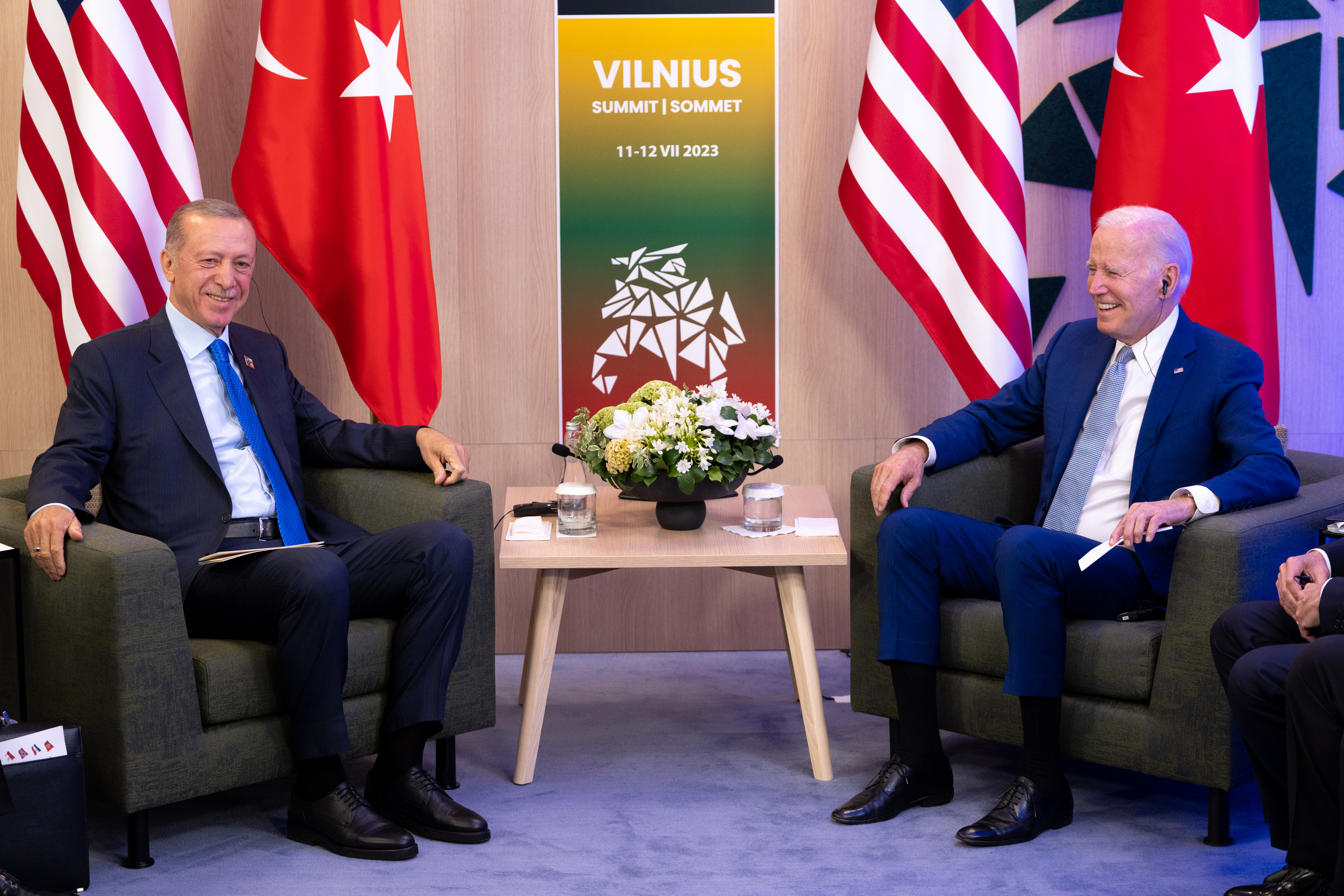
President Joe Biden and President Recep Tayyip Erdoğan of Turkey, July 2023

=== Coup attempt (2016) ===
On July 15, 2016, a coup d'état was attempted in Turkey by a faction within the Turkish Armed Forces against state institutions, including, but not limited to the government and President Recep Tayyip Erdoğan.

The Turkish government accused the coup leaders of being linked to the Gülen movement, which is designated as a terrorist organization by the Republic of Turkey and led by Fethullah Gülen, a Turkish businessman and cleric who lives in Pennsylvania, United States. Erdoğan accuses Gülen of being behind the coup—a claim that Gülen denies—and accused the United States of harboring him. President Recep Tayyip Erdoğan accused the head of United States Central Command, chief General Joseph Votel of "siding with coup plotters," (after Votel accused the Turkish government of arresting the Pentagon's contacts in Turkey).

== Bilateral relations in the Greater Middle East ==
=== American allies ===
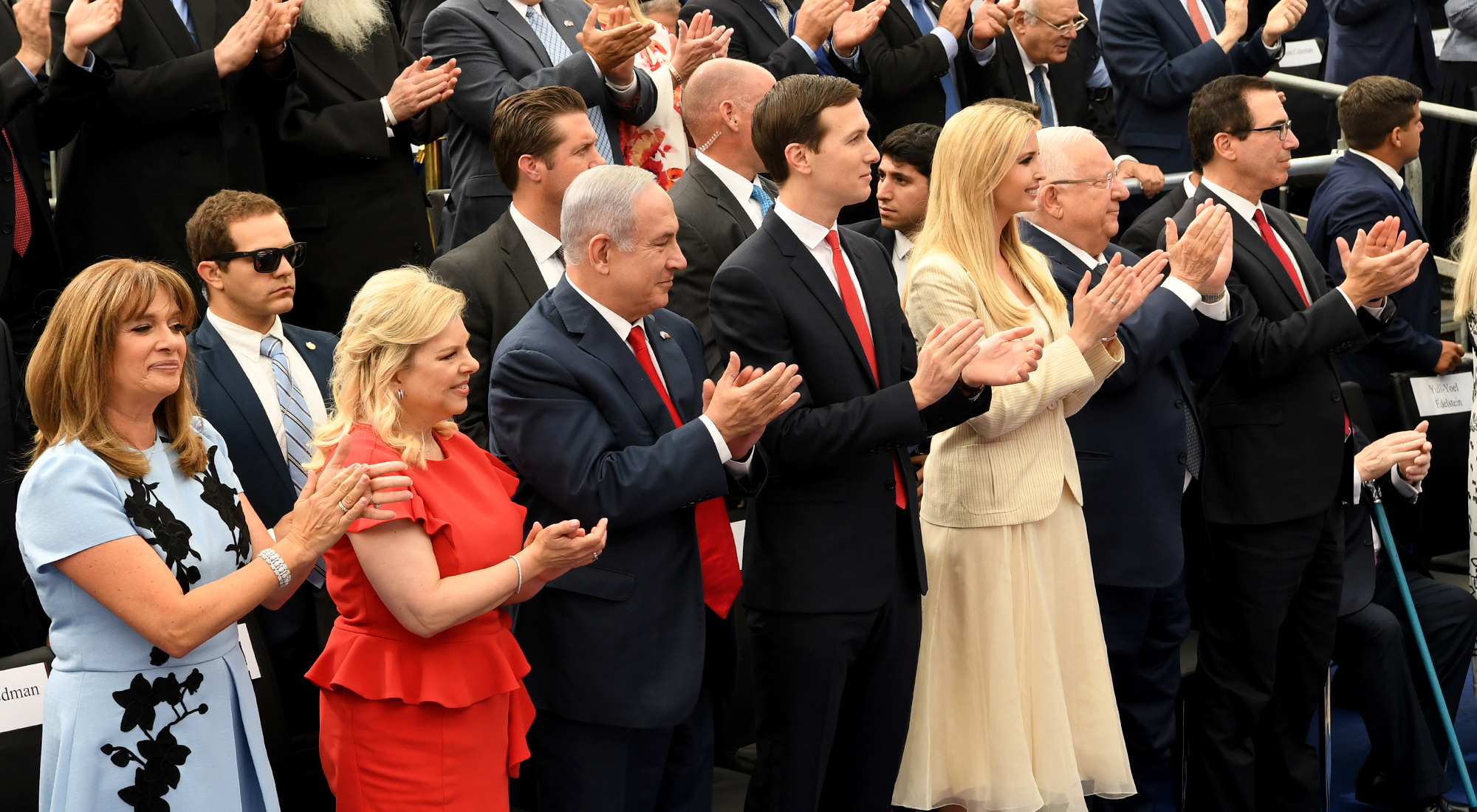
A dedication ceremony of the Embassy of the United States in Jerusalem, Israel, May 2018

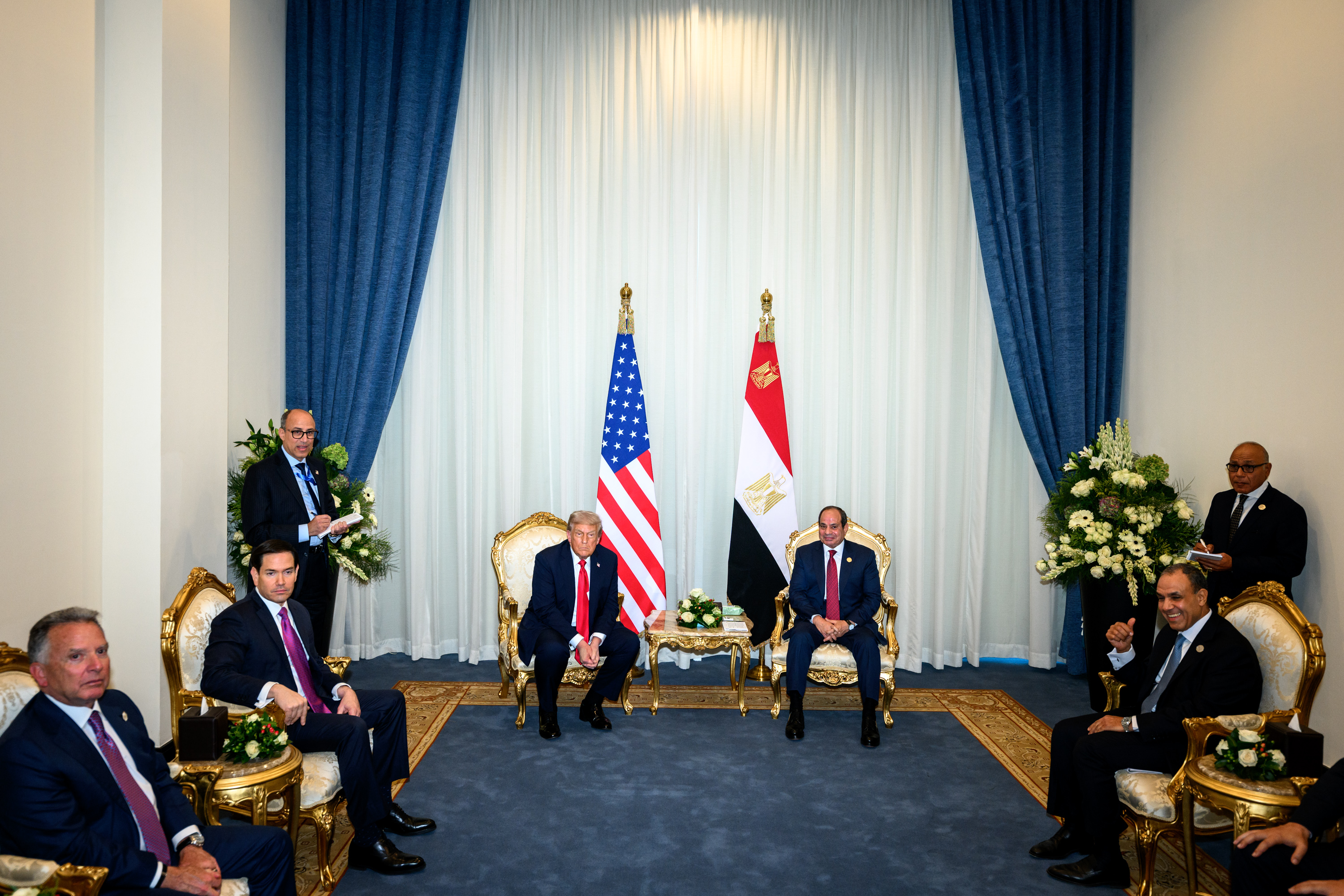
US President Donald Trump meeting Egypt's President Abdel Fattah El-Sisi on sidelines of Sharm El-Sheikh Peace Summit, Sharm El Sheikh, Egypt, October 2025

States

- Egypt (see Egypt–United States relations) (Major non-NATO ally)
- Israel (see Israel–United States relations) (Major non-NATO ally)
- Saudi Arabia (see Saudi Arabia–United States relations)
- Turkey (see Turkey–United States relations) (NATO member state)
- Qatar (see Qatar–United States relations) (Major non-NATO ally)
- Bahrain (see Bahrain–United States relations) (Major non-NATO ally)
- Kuwait (see Kuwait–United States relations) (Major non-NATO ally)
- United Arab Emirates (see United Arab Emirates–United States relations)
- Jordan (see Jordan–United States relations) (Major non-NATO ally)
- Cyprus (see Cyprus–United States relations)

Autonomous region

- Kurdistan Region (see Iraqi Kurdistan–United States relations)

Factions and organizations

- People's Mujahedin of Iran
  - National Council of Resistance of Iran
- Pahlavi Royal Family (led by Reza Pahlavi)
- Syrian Democratic Forces

Ex-allies

- Imperial State of Iran (see Iranian Islamic Revolution, 1953 Iranian coup d'état)
- (Syrian opposition) Free Syrian Army (see Timber Sycamore, American-led intervention in the Syrian Civil War) (Note: The Trump administration ends CIA arms support for anti-Assad Syria rebels in 2017)
- Islamic Republic of Afghanistan (see 2021 Taliban offensive)

=== Hostile relations with America ===
States

- Iran (see Iran–United States relations, United States sanctions against Iran)
- Syria (see Syria–United States relations, US intervention in the Syrian civil war)
- Pakistan (see Pakistan–United States relations, Alleged Pakistani support for Osama bin Laden, Lettergate) (Note: The United States accused Pakistan of supporting terrorism and ended its military aid in 2018. After withdrawing from Afghanistan in 2021, the US also sanctioned Pakistan's missile and nuclear weapons programs)
- Turkey (see Turkey–United States relations) (Note: Relations between the two have deteriorated since about 2016 following the aftermath of the 2016 Turkish coup attempt)
- Iraq (see Iraq–United States relations) (Note: Although the two countries still maintain a certain degree of cooperation, relations have worsened ever since the end of the War in Iraq)
- Afghanistan (see Afghanistan–United States relations, International relations with the Taliban) (Note: Most countries, including the United States, have not recognition of the Islamic Emirate of Afghanistan after 2021)

Organizations

- Al-Qaeda
- Islamic Revolutionary Guard Corps
- Hezbollah
- Popular Mobilization Forces
- Houthi movement
- Hamas
- Palestinian Islamic Jihad
- Islamic State
- Popular Front for the Liberation of Palestine
- Popular Front for the Liberation of Palestine – General Command
- Popular Resistance Committees
- Kata'ib Hezbollah
- Asa'ib Ahl al-Haq

== Criticism ==
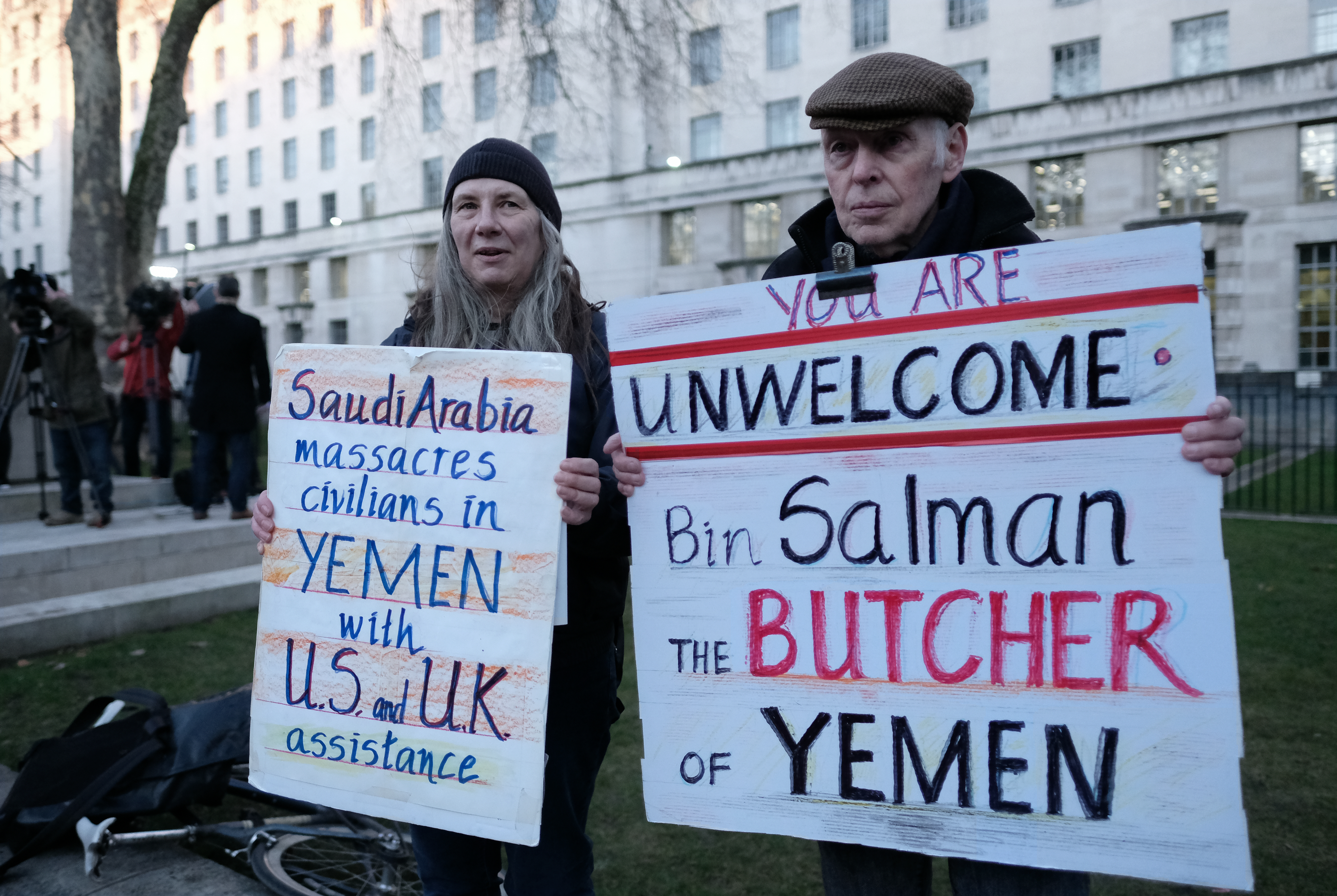
A protest against U.S. involvement in the Saudi Arabian-led intervention in Yemen, March 2018

The U.S. has been accused by some U.N. officials of condoning actions by Israel against Palestinians.

== See also ==
- 2023 American–Middle East conflict
- British foreign policy in the Middle East
- Arab Cold War
- Arab lobby in the United States
- Donroe Doctrine
- Dual containment
- Foreign relations of the Arab League
- Gulf War
- United States–Middle East economic relations
- United States–Gulf Cooperation Council relations
- Middle Eastern foreign policy of the Barack Obama administration
- Mission Accomplished
- Foreign interventions by the United States

Books

- The Israel Lobby and U.S. Foreign Policy
