= Foreign relations of the Arab League =

The Arab League, officially the League of Arab States, was founded in 1945 by Egypt, Iraq, Transjordan, Lebanon, Saudi Arabia, Syria, and Yemen. It currently has 22 member states, with several observer states, including Armenia, Chad, Eritrea, and Greece.

The Arab League is also an observer in several international and regional organizations, including the United Nations, the Organisation of Islamic Cooperation, and the African Union, and has observed several summits of ASEAN and the Non-Aligned Movement.

== Members ==
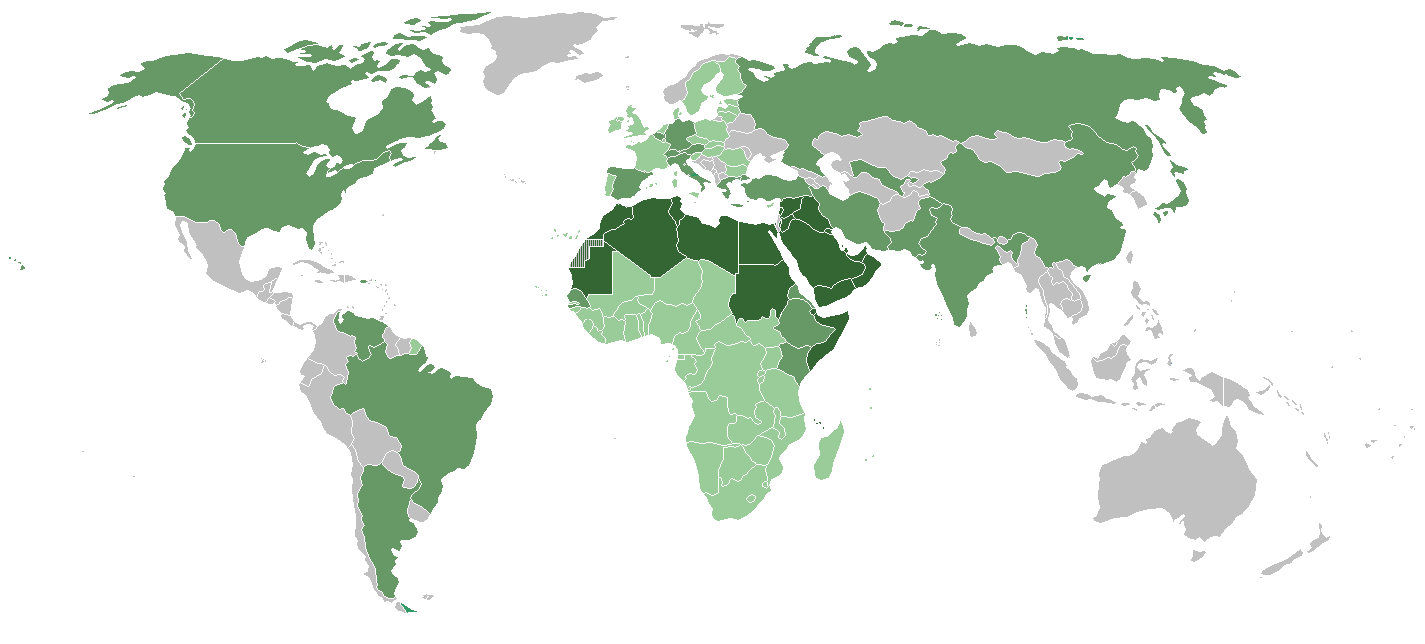
Diplomatic relations of the Arab League Arab League member states and Arab League embassies, delegations and Offices European Union and African Union

=== Member states ===
- Algeria
- Bahrain
- Egypt
- Iraq
- Jordan
- Kuwait
- Lebanon
- Libya
- Maldives
- Morocco
- Oman
- Palestine
- Qatar
- Saudi Arabia
- Seychelles
- Sudan
- Syria
- Tunisia
- United Arab Emirates
- Yemen

=== Observer states ===
- Armenia
- Brazil
- Chad
- Cyprus
- Eritrea
- Malta
- Venezuela

== Middle East And Asian Continent ==
=== ASEAN ===
By January 2008 the Arab League and ASEAN had no significant relations, but the Arab League's Economic Council decided to Expand economic cooperation with regional blocs, to benefit from their economic experience and development, and started contacting the Association of Southeast Asian Nations (ASEAN), to build better relations and to increase investments from this region, and to learn from their economic achievements to be applied in the League.

The head of the delegation, who was also Secretary General of the Arab Council for Economic Development (ACED), Dr. Ahmed Jweily, signed a treaty of understanding and cooperation between the two organizations, which will help the Arab States increase internal investment and trade. The delegation concluded the visit by announcing that three new Arab unions would be proposed at the council's 87th summit.

=== Bangladesh ===
Bangladesh has strong relationships with Arab nations, particularly Saudi Arabia, due to shared Islamic values, a large Bangladeshi diaspora in Saudi Arabia, and mutual cooperation in international organizations like the Organization of Islamic Cooperation (OIC).

=== China ===
The recent economic boom in the People's Republic of China has led to an increased demand for oil and other raw petroleum products, much of which has been supplied by member states of the Arab League. Chinese-Arab relations in the past few years have increased with the institution of several Arab-Chinese business forums, conferences and meetings to increase trade and cooperation in recent years. China is the second-largest financial investor in Sudan following the other members of the Arab League, and as a result a majority of Sudan's production of petroleum is sent overseas to China. Foreign ties have also been made with the Arab League States of Morocco, Algeria, Egypt, Iraq and Syria in order to further invest in petroleum production in the Middle East and North Africa. As of 2008, the Arab League and the People's Republic of China have agreed to create an annual forum between the two parties in order to discuss matters of economics, trade and environmental studies. In 2009, the forum was expanded to also include the discussion of various nuclear projects.

=== Russia ===
Russia has entertained diplomatic relations with the Arab world since the 7th century CE, when the Khazar Khaganate waged war against the Rashidun and Umayyad caliphates.

Relations have flourished most under the Soviet Union, due to the Communist Union of Soviet Socialist Republics' support for several Socialist Arab regimes against the Capitalist United States during the Cold War, regimes like Nasser's Egypt and the Baathist regimes of Iraq and Syria, as well as other Socialist regimes in Libya and South Yemen.

=== Japan ===
The Arab-Japanese political relations date back to at least the early 20th century, manifested in Japan's recognition of Egypt immediately after its independence in 1922 and opened its first consulate in Port Said in 1919. This is considered the first official diplomatic contact in the Middle East for Japan.

The PLO opened their office in Tokyo in 1978. The Prime Minister of Japan Masayoshi Ōhira stated in the House of Councillors that the legitimate rights of the Palestinian people must include their right to establish an independent state, and that these rights must be recognized, especially the right to self-determination.

At the First Ministerial Conference of the Japanese-Arab Political Dialogue in November 2017, In Cairo, Japanese Foreign Minister Taro Kono confirmed that the Middle East is a top priority for Japan, because it represents an important component of his country, "being one of the factors that cause Japan to live in welfare, whether socially or economically, because it is a primary driver of the Japanese economy".

After the end of the cold War and the establishment of the Russian Federation, new ties have been made. Russian Federation with its strong diplomatic relations with Arab States from the Soviet Era, is trying to regain its strength by supporting their causes, especially in the Security Council.

=== Iran ===
Historically, Iranian-Arab relations have been unstable. Conflicts within the Middle East have influenced judgements of Arab governments concerning Iran. North African states have entertained closer diplomatic relations with Iran due to limited shared history.

=== Pakistan ===
Pakistan also enjoys extensive cultural and defense/military ties with most of the Arab League member states. Pakistan also has extensive trade ties with Arab League member states, especially Saudi Arabia and the UAE with Saudi Arabia ranking as Pakistan's second largest trading partner after the United States.

== European Continent ==
=== European Union ===
The Arab League and the European Union have maintained relations since the European Union evolved from a primarily economic organization into a more political one. In March 2007, the 19th Arab League Summit was held in Riyadh, Saudi Arabia, in the presence of the Spanish politician Javier Solana who represented the European Union's full support of the Arab Peace Initiative of 2002. Following the event, during which he held meetings with Palestinian President Mahmoud Abbas and Arab League Secretary General Amr Moussa, Solana stated: "Once again we find ourselves together, the European Union and the Arab League States, once again we have an opportunity to re-affirm our joint commitment to the values of civilisation that we share, more than ever Europeans and Arabs have to face common challenges, I am confident that we will find new ways to improve our cooperation".

=== Israel ===
Only a handful of Arab states recognize the State of Israel. As of 2026, they are Egypt, Jordan, United Arab Emirates, Bahrain, Morocco, Sudan (normalization announced but not fully implemented), and Palestine. Following the 2008–2009 Gaza War, Qatar suspended its low-level relations with Israel, while Mauritania froze and later severed diplomatic relations. Morocco did not sever diplomatic relations after the war; its liaison offices had already been closed in 2000 during the Second Intifada, and it formally normalized relations with Israel again in 2020.

=== France ===
France has been historically affiliated with Arabic countries in North Africa (the Maghreb) and in the Near East, primarily due to French colonisation of the region. France is therefore culturally tied to the Arab World, particularly Maghrebi countries, the Arab people in France is estimated to be over 4 million, making it one of the largest Arab diaspora communities in European Continent.

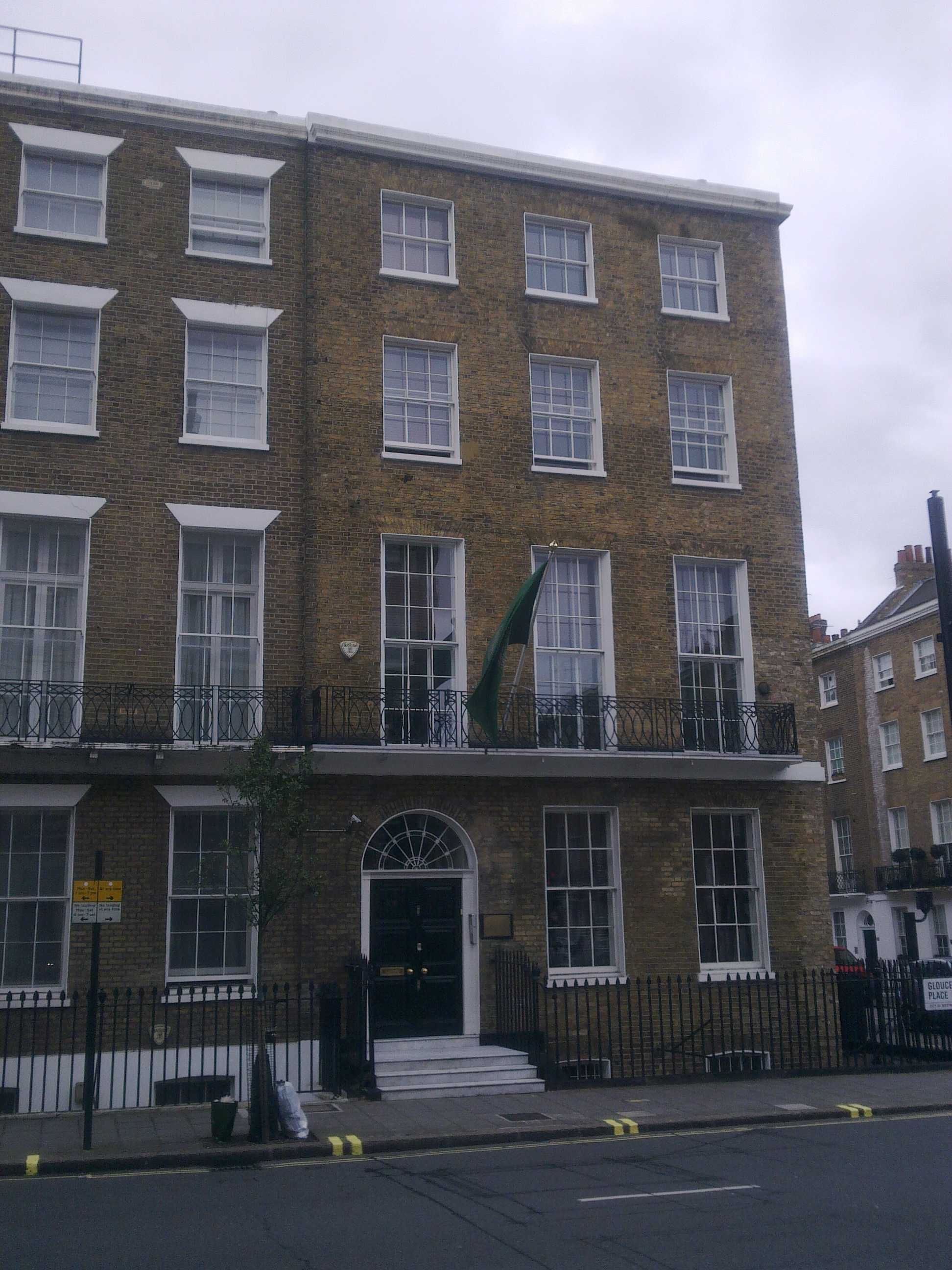
Embassies of League of Arab States in London, England, United Kingdom

== United Kingdom of Great Britain and Northern Ireland ==
The UK and the Arab League have a multifaceted relationship characterized by diplomatic, economic, and security ties. The UK maintains a long-standing strategic partnership with the Arab world, including strong bilateral relationships with individual countries like Saudi Arabia and the UAE, and also engages with the Arab League as a regional organisation.

== African Continent ==
Formal relations between the Arab League and the African Union started in 1977, when they announced their cooperation in financial, political and economic issues. With a summit between both organizations in Cairo that same year, they have signed several treaties aimed at improving cooperation.

On 16 January 2008, the Arab League sent a Delegation to the AU Headquarters in Addis Ababa, Ethiopian Capital, to gain experience from the African Security and Peace Council, which has been in work since 2004, the Arab League's decision to create an Arab Peace and Security Council was taken following the 2006 Lebanon war, in a procedure to place Peace keeping forces into South Sudan, South Lebanon, and the Horn of Africa, other regions such as Iraq and Iranians have not been announced or spoken of, since the Arab League's official Stance denounces any form of Foreign troops in Iraq, to maintain stability. Algeria, Mauritania, Libya, Morocco, Tunisia, Egypt, Sudan, Djibouti, Somalia and Comoros are common members in Organisation of Islamic Cooperation and involve of these two international Organisations.

=== Ethiopia ===
In 2003, Eritrea became the first Observer in the Pan-Arab body, opening the door for it to become a prospect member in the Arab League States, while the current Eritrean president has denied any plans for joining the League in the near future, due to its lack of efficiency.

== America's Continents ==
Relations between the Arab League and the Union of South American Nations (USAN) have been established in recent years. The population of the Arab community in Latin America is currently estimated to be approximately 20 to 25 million, which, according to Brazilian President Luiz Inácio Lula da Silva, justified initiatives to improve political relations with the Middle East. The alliance between the Arab League and USAN also provided an opportunity to resolve both regions' dependence on the developed world, particularly Western Europe, the US and Japan. Political discussions between the Arab League and Latin America mainly concern energy ressources and trade. In May 2005, 35 countries were convened for the first Summit of South American-Arab Countries (ASPA) held in Brazil.

During the event, delegates called for Israel to dismantle settlements in Palestine, advocated for reform in the United Nations, expressed concerns regarding sanctions imposed on Syria by the United States and their support for Argentine in disputes on the Falkland Islands.

=== Brazil ===
Brazil was admitted as an observer to the Arab League in 2003 and in 2004. The country has a large Arab community, with over 11 million inhabitants of Arabic descent, predominantly from Lebanon.

=== United States ===
Interactions between the United States and the Middle East prior to World War II were limited. Following the decline of the Ottoman Empire in 1918, diplomatic relations between the US and the Middle East improved, notably due to the former's investments in the modernisation of health care and educational institutions in several member states of what would become the Arab League. The US also provided Middle Eastern countries with highly skilled petroleum engineers. Other examples of cooperation between the US and the Arab World include the 1928 Red Line Agreement and the unsuccessful Anglo-American Petroleum Agreement issued in 1944, which facilitated American control of energy resources in the Middle East, namely petroleum products, and assured US economic security by preventing the emergence of a significant competitor on the international market. The 1928 Red Line Agreement constituted part of a network of agreements made in the 1920s to restrict the supply of petroleum and to ensure that major, predominantly American, companies could control oil prices on world markets for the following decades. The Anglo-American Petroleum Agreement was based on negotiations between the United States and the United Kingdom over the control of Arab people and Middle Eastern oil wealth of Aramco.

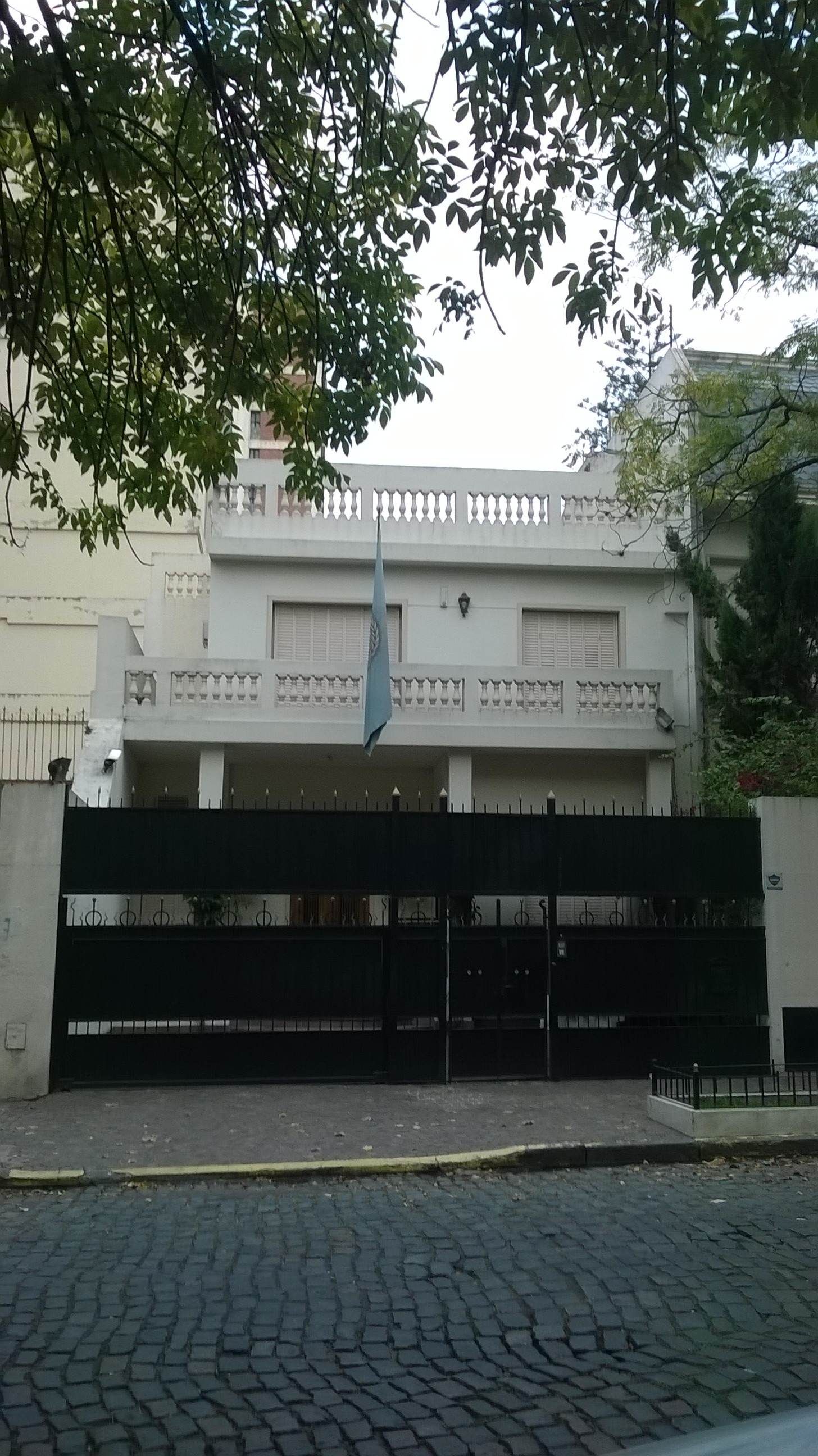
Embassies of the League of Arab States in Buenos Aires; and São Paulo

=== Turkey ===
Turkey and Turkic peoples have historical connections to the Arab world dating back to the medieval period, through the Mamluks, the Ottomans, and other Turco-Persian empires. Turkey has expressed desires for an observer status in the League of Arab States, but has been refused for several political reasons. One of the reasons for refusals came from Iraq and Baathist Syria due to the Turkish Water Projects on the Tigris and Euphrates rivers, especially the Atatürk Dam. Also the Hatay Province's choice of self-annexation to Turkey in 1939 was never recognized by Syria, which continues to show the Hatay Province of Turkey as part of Syria's territory in its maps. After the fall of the Assad regime, Turkey has restored ties with Syria and maintains very close relations. A primary concern for Turkey stems from the possibility of an independent Kurdish state arising from a destabilized Syria. Turkey is currently fighting a war against Kurdish insurgents on its own soil, in which an estimated 37,000 people have lost their lives.

After the end of the Qatar diplomatic crisis, Turkey has improved relations with Egypt, Saudi Arabia, the United Arab Emirates, and Tunisia.

=== Uzbekistan ===
Arab League relations with Uzbekistan have been almost nonexistent until 2007. Then the Arab League Secretary General Amr Moussa and the Uzbek president Islam Karimov have met to continue discussions held previously in Cairo, for more Arab cooperation with Central Asia and more Central Asian support for Arab causes, such as Iraq, Sudan and Palestine.

=== Venezuela ===
Venezuela has a large Arab population from Syria, Lebanon and Palestine, has supported the Palestinian cause, and is one of two Latin American countries to cut off ties with Israel (the other being Bolivia). It was granted observer status in the Arab League in 2006.
