= ASPA =

ASPA may refer to:

- Allocation de Solidarité aux Personnes Agées
- American Service-Members' Protection Act
- American Society for Public Administration
- American Samoa Power Authority
- Animals (Scientific Procedures) Act 1986
- Antarctic Specially Protected Area
- Aotearoa Student Press Association
- ASPA (car), a 1920s Czech car
- ASPA (gene), Aspartoacylase, on human chromosome 17
- Autonomous System Provider Authorizations in Internet routing
- Summit of South American-Arab Countries

== See also ==
- Aspa (disambiguation)
