= Aspa =

Aspa may refer to:

- Animals (Scientific Procedures) Act 1986, which regulates the use of animals in scientific research in the United Kingdom
- Aspa, Lleida, a village in Catalonia, Spain
- Aspa, Nyköping, a village in Nyköping Municipality, Sweden
- Aspa (river), a river in Russia
- Aspa (gastropod), a genus of gastropods

== See also ==
- ASPA (disambiguation)
