= Commando Basic Training Centre (United Kingdom) =

Former British Army training establishment

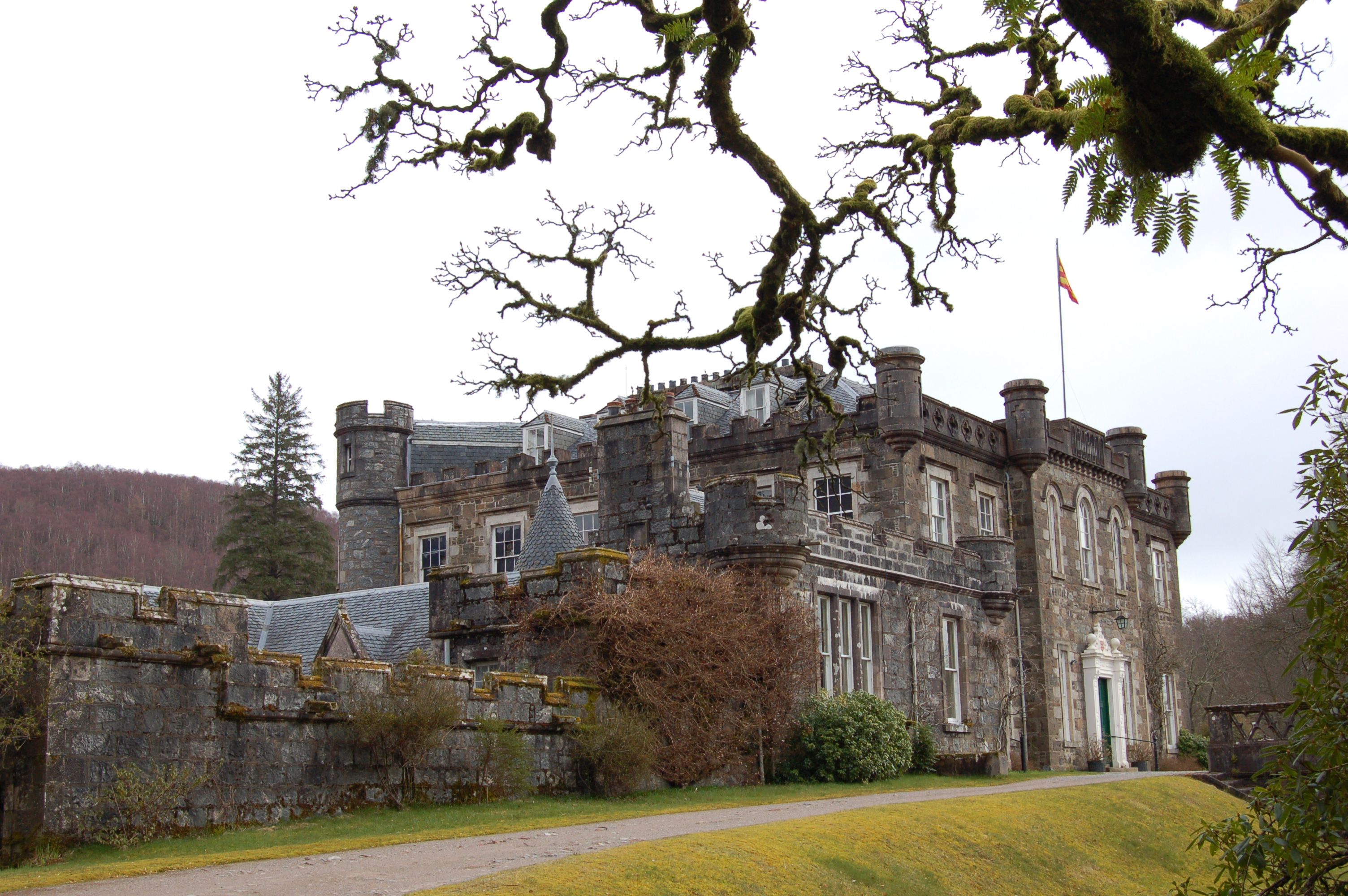
- Achnacarry Castle

Site information
- Owner: Sir Donald Walter Cameron of Lochiel
- Operator: Combined Operations

Location
- Coordinates: 56°56′53″N 4°59′38″W

Site history
- In use: 1940–1946

The Commando Basic Training Centre was a British Army training establishment primarily for the training of British Commandos during the Second World War. It was located in the grounds of Achnacarry Castle in the Scottish Highland region of Lochaber.

== Background ==
In 1940 Winston Churchill, Prime Minister of the United Kingdom, called for the creation of a small raiding force in order to disrupt the Wehrmacht and boost British morale. Lieutenant Colonel Dudley Clarke proposed a force loosely based on the tactics of the Boer Commandos, namely small-scale raids behind enemy lines, targeted to disrupt, damage and, if possible destroy, military installations and supply lines. Initially these new Commandos units were made up of soldiers from British Army regiments, however in 1942 many Royal Marines Battalions were reorganised into Commandos. They were also supplemented by members of the Royal Navy and Royal Air Force.

== History ==
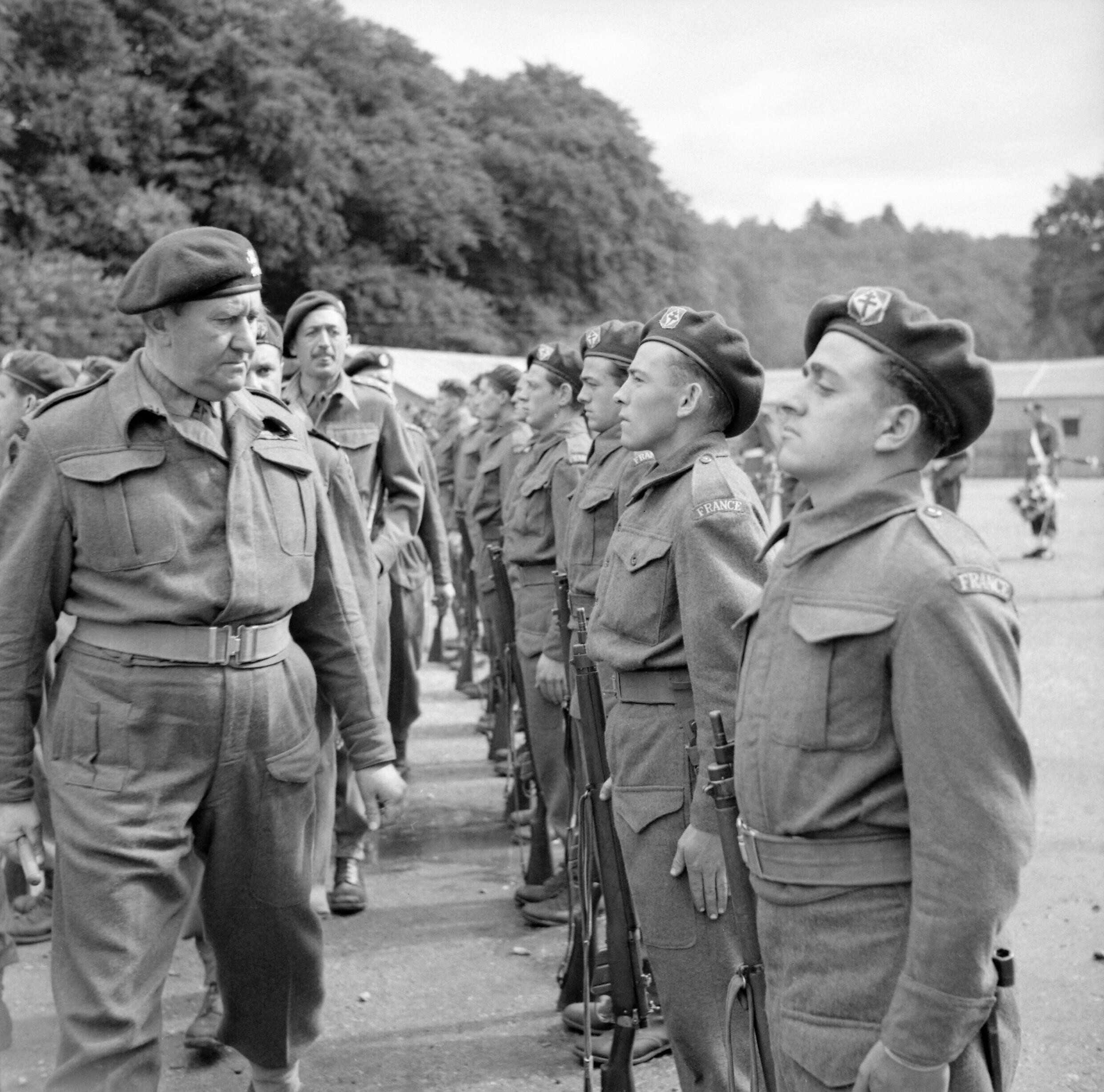
Lieutenant Colonel Charles Vaughan inspecting French troops

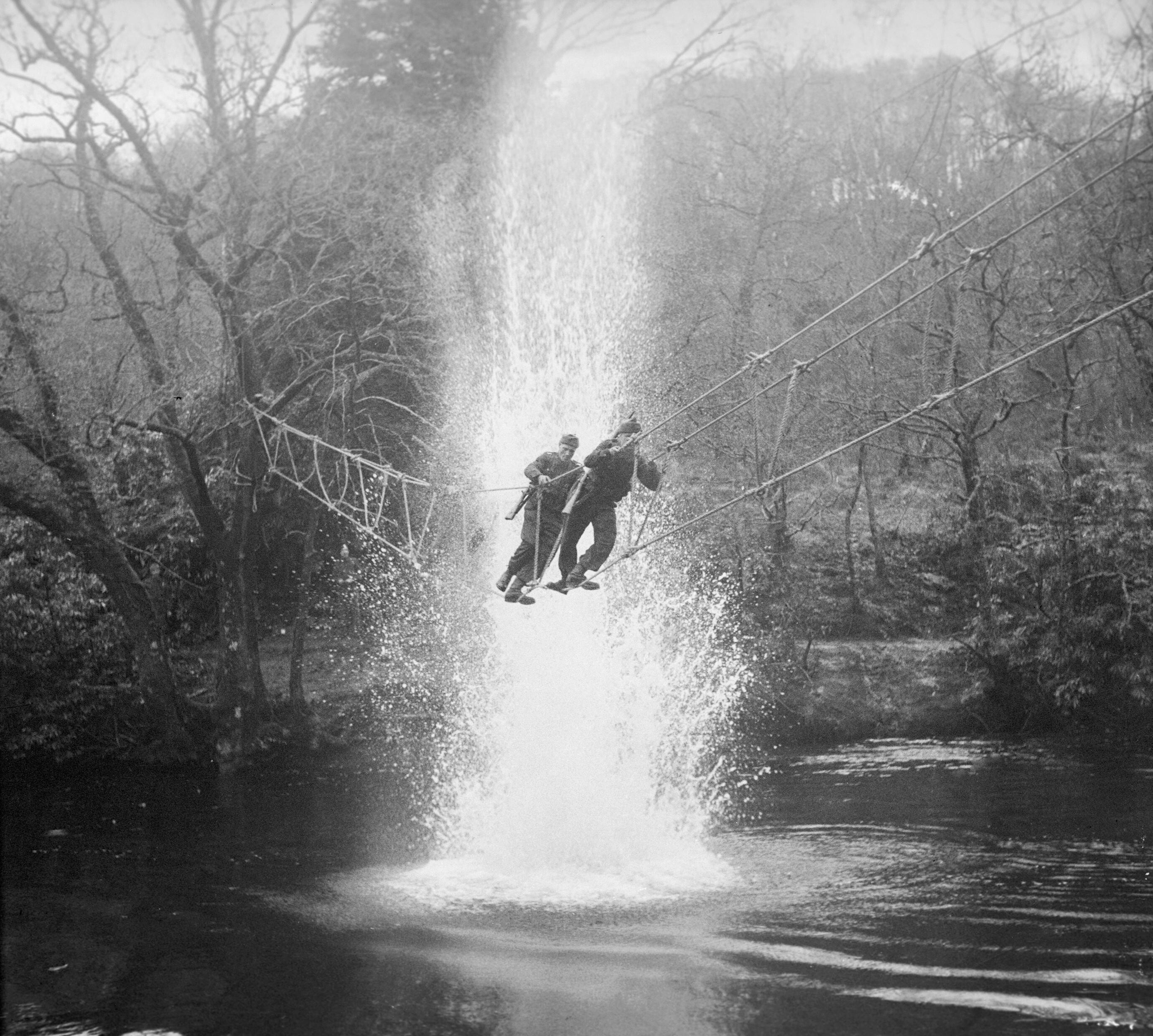
Commandos in training cross a river at Achnacarry under simulated fire.

In 1940 Achnacarry Castle, the ancestral seat of Sir Donald Walter Cameron of Lochiel, was brought into use as part of the new Training and Holding Wing for the Special Training Centre Lochailort. Due to the imminent closing of STC Lochailort and the realisation that a centralised training establishment was needed to train the potential commandos, Brigadier Charles Haydon established the Commando Depot in December 1941. Prior to this each individual Commando Unit was responsible for the training of Commando Personnel .

In early 1942 this was redesigned as the Commando Basic Training Centre, and, under the command of Lieutenant Colonel Charles Vaughan, the first prospective commandos arrived to complete the centralised course. It then came under the authority of the Special Service Brigade. By this time a drill square had been laid down and pasture within the vicinity of the house had been replaced by asphalt. Nissen huts now stood within the grounds around the drill square. These huts contained accommodation for men, housing between 25 and 40, dining halls, and washing rooms. Due to the secret nature of this training, the British Government prevented people from visiting much of Lochaber by preventing the crossing of non-residents over the Caledonian Canal.

The CBTC trained both British Commandos and foreign nationals from occupied countries such as France, Greece, Norway and Poland as well as some Germans, part of No. 10 (Inter-Allied) Commando, who were designated 'free Germans'. Contingents from the newly formed United States Army Rangers were also trained there. In 1946 after the war had come to the end it was decided a significant Commando capability was not needed in peacetime and the CBTC at Achnacarry was disbanded.

Between 1942 and 1946 over 25,000 personnel were trained at Achnacarry and it is widely believed that it was the birthplace of modern special forces.

The Commando Memorial, a memorial to all Commandos of the Second World War, now stands overlooking the training grounds at Achnacarry on a point that all potential Commandos would have passed on the way to CBTC from the Spean Bridge railway station.

== Training ==
The prospective Commando arrived at the Spean Bridge railway station and marched 7 miles to Achnacarry where they began their training, officers, and their men training side by side. Training for a prospective Commando consisted of an intensive regime of physical fitness and instruction in survival, orienteering and vehicle operation. This was alongside instruction on different weapons systems, demolition skills, close-quarter combat as well as amphibious and cliff assault. Any prospective Commando who failed to meet the standard was returned to their parent unit. The training was conducted with live rounds in order to simulate battle as effectively as possible. This realistic training led to the deaths of a number of trainees.

In 1943 the focus of the Commando training shifted to more conventional methods of warfare.
