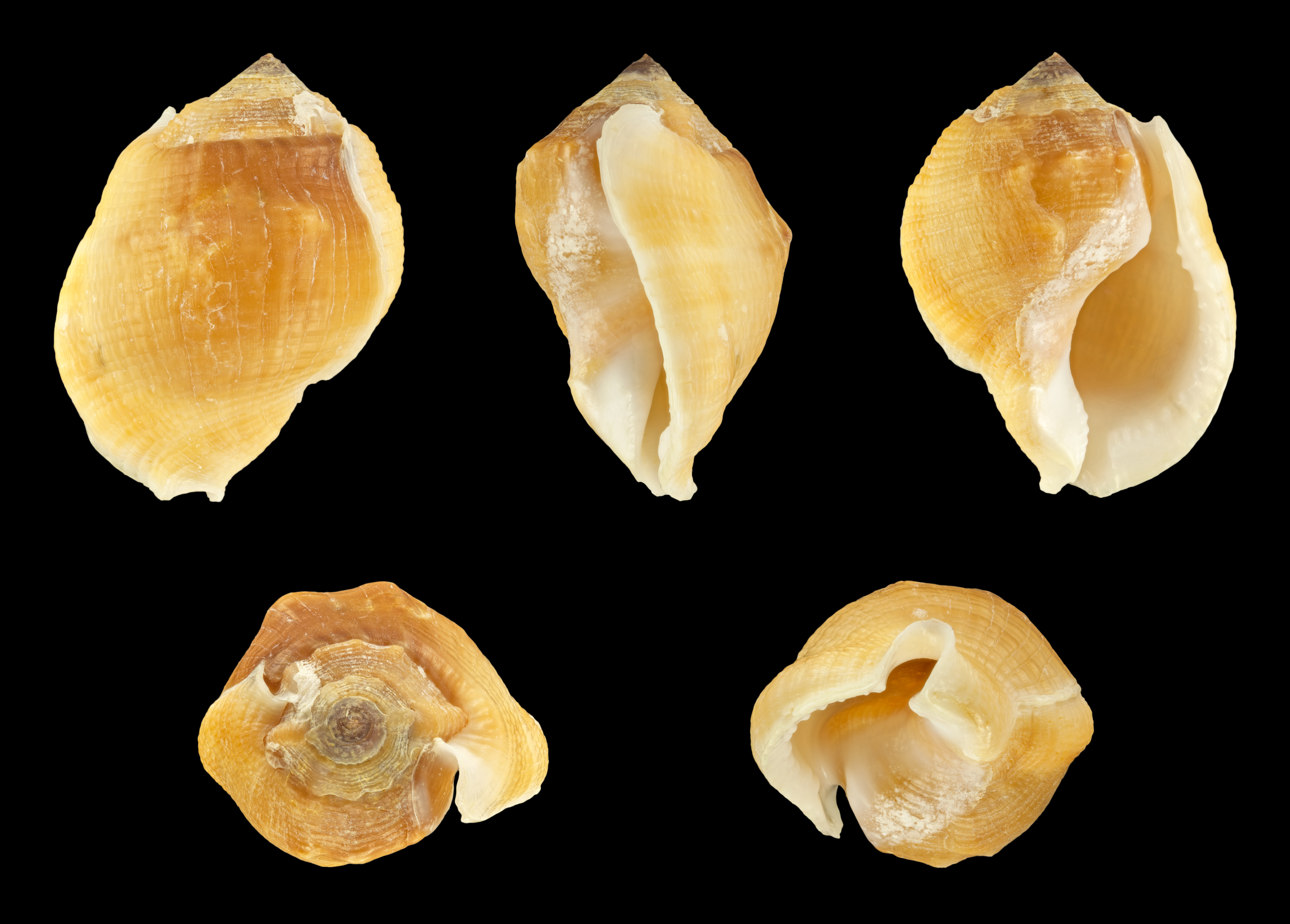
- Aspa marginata (Gmelin, 1791)

Scientific classification
- Kingdom: Animalia
- Phylum: Mollusca
- Class: Gastropoda
- Subclass: Caenogastropoda
- Order: Littorinimorpha
- Family: Bursidae
- Genus: Aspa
- Species: A. marginata

Binomial name
- Aspa marginata (Gmelin, 1791)

Synonyms
- Buccinum marginatum Gmelin, 1791; Buccinum marginatum Martini, 1777 unavailable name (non-binomial); Bufonaria marginata (Gmelin, 1791); Bursa marginata (Gmelin, 1791); Eione inflata Risso, 1826; Ranella (Aspa) marginata (Martini, 1777) unavailable name (non-binomial); † Ranella brocchii Bronn, 1828; † Ranella laevigata Lamarck, 1822

= Aspa marginata =

Aspa marginata Temporal range: Miocene - Recent

Species of gastropod

Aspa marginata is a species of sea snail, a marine gastropod mollusk in the family Bursidae, the frog shells.

== Description ==
Shells of Aspa marginata can reach a size of 20–40 millimetres (0.79–1.57 in). These shells are quite thick, beige in color, with a smooth surface, a deep siphonal canal and a short spire.

== Distribution ==
This marine species occurs in Western Africa, Senegal and Canary Islands.

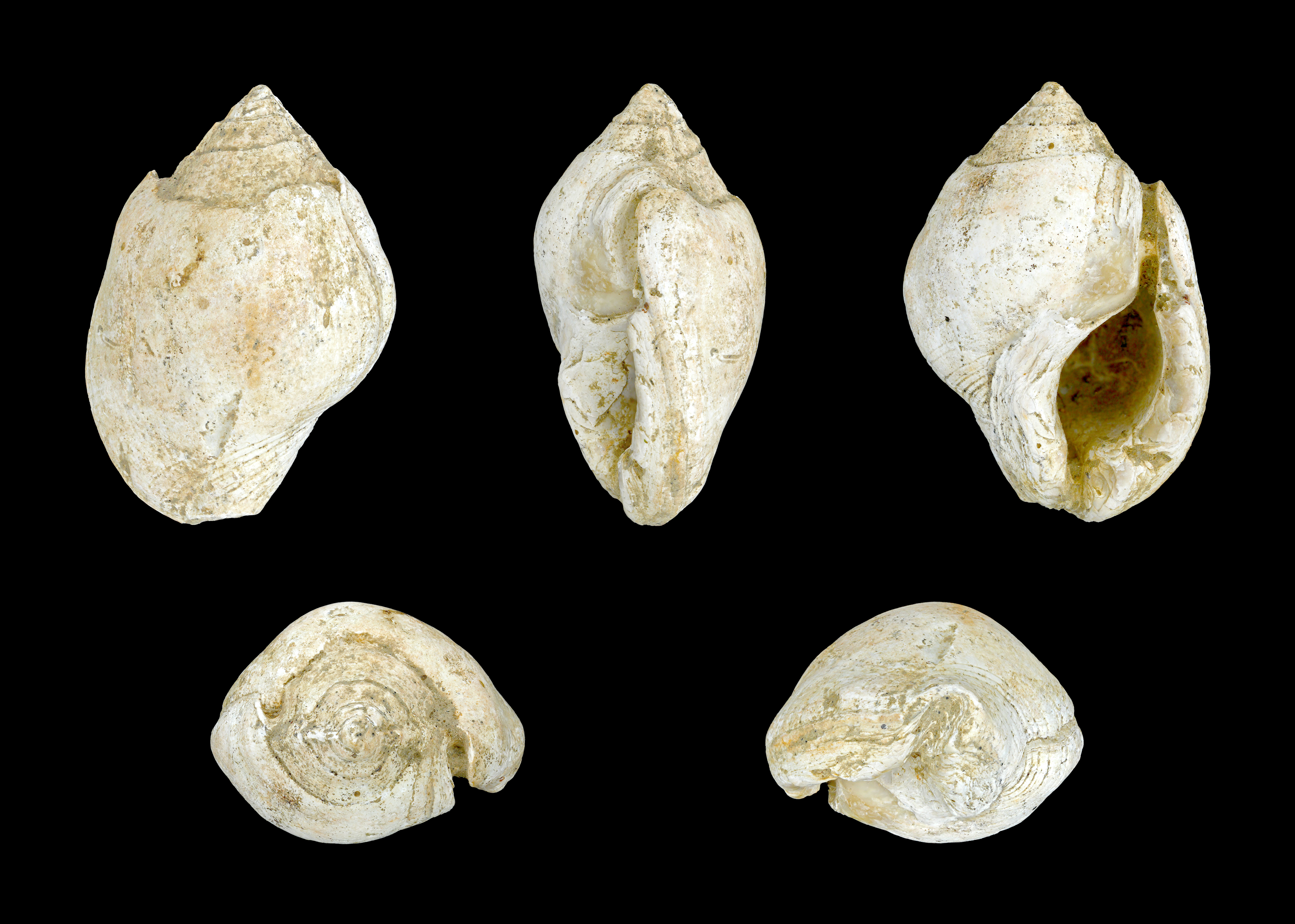
Fossil shell of Aspa marginata from the Pliocene of Italy

== Fossil records ==
This genus is known in the fossil records from the Miocene of Italy and France to the Quaternary of Namibia and Spain (age range: from 15.97 to 0.781 million years ago).

== Cultural aspects ==
The fossilized shells have been valued by humans and Neanderthals.

== Bibliography ==
- Bronn, H. G. (1827). Verzeichniss der bei dem Heidelberger Mineralien-Komptoir verkäuflichen Konchylien-, Pflanzenthier- und andern Versteinerungen. Taschenbuch für die gesammte Mineralogie. 8: 529-544.
- Bernard, P.A. (Ed.) (1984). Coquillages du Gabon [Shells of Gabon]. Pierre A. Bernard: Libreville, Gabon. 140, 75 plates
- Gofas, S.; Afonso, J.P.; Brandào, M. (Ed.). (S.a.). Conchas e Moluscos de Angola = Coquillages et Mollusques d'Angola. [Shells and molluscs of Angola]. Universidade Agostinho / Elf Aquitaine Angola: Angola. 140 pp.
- Gofas, S.; Le Renard, J.; Bouchet, P. (2001). Mollusca, in: Costello, M.J. et al. (Ed.) (2001). European register of marine species: a check-list of the marine species in Europe and a bibliography of guides to their identification. Collection Patrimoines Naturels, 50: pp. 180–213
- Rolán E., 2005. Malacological Fauna From The Cape Verde Archipelago. Part 1, Polyplacophora and Gastropoda.
- Beu, A. G. (2010). Neogene tonnoidean gastropods of tropical and South America: contributions to the Dominican Republic and Panama paleontology projects and uplift of the Central American isthmus. Bulletins of American Paleontology. 377-378: 1-550, pls. 1-79.
