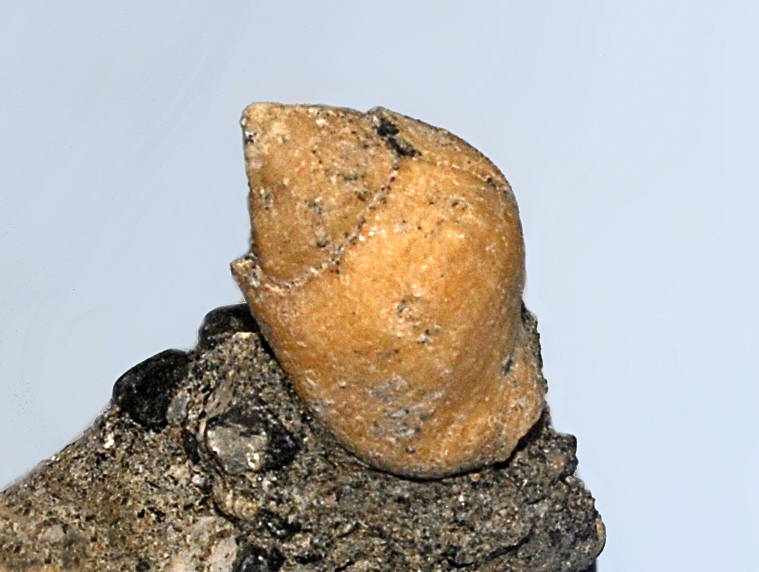
- Fossil shell of Aspa marginata

Scientific classification
- Kingdom: Animalia
- Phylum: Mollusca
- Class: Gastropoda
- Subclass: Caenogastropoda
- Order: Littorinimorpha
- Superfamily: Tonnoidea
- Family: Bursidae
- Genus: Aspa; H. Adams & A. Adams, 1853

Type species
- † Ranella laevigata Lamarck, 1822

Synonyms
- Bursa (Aspa) H. Adams & A. Adams, 1853 (original rank); Ranella (Aspa) H. Adams & A. Adams, 1853 superseded rank

= Aspa (gastropod) =

Aspa Temporal range: Miocene - Recent

Genus of gastropods

Aspa is a genus of sea snails, marine gastropod mollusks in the family Bursidae, the frog shells.

== Description ==
The ovate shell is ventricose and smooth. The spire is very short. The whorls are nodulous at the angles.

== Species ==
Species within the genus Aspa include:

- Aspa marginata (Gmelin, 1791)

The genus Aspa is known in the fossil record from the Miocene epoch, about 13.65 million years ago. These fossils have been found in the Quaternary of Namibia and Spain, in the Pliocene of Costa Rica, Greece and Spain and in the Miocene of Austria, Greece, Hungary and Italy.
