= Summit of South American-Arab Countries =

The Summit of South American-Arab Countries (Arabic: قمة الدول العربية ودول أمريكا الجنوبية, French: Sommet Amérique du Sud-Pays Arabes, Portuguese: Cúpula América do Sul-Países Árabes, Spanish: Cumbre América del Sur-Países Árabes) is a bi-regional mechanism for cooperation and political coordination, which gathers the 22 member-States of the League of Arab States and the 12 countries of South America. Better known by its Portuguese and Spanish acronym ASPA, the bi-regional forum was created upon proposal of the Brazilian President Luiz Inácio Lula da Silva, during the I ASPA Summit of Heads of State and Government, held in Brasília, Brazil, in May 2005. Since its inception, a second ASPA Summit happened in Doha, Qatar, in March 2009, and a third Summit was held in Lima, Peru, in October 2012, after being postponed, from February 2011, due to the Arab Spring uprisings. The 4th ASPA Summit was held in Riyadh, Saudi Arabia, from 9 to 11 November 2015.

== Member-states ==
ASPA is composed of 34 member-States and the General Secretariats of the League of Arab States (LAS) and the Union of South American Nations (UNASUR). The South American member-States are: Argentina, Bolivia, Brazil, Chile, Colombia, Ecuador, Guyana, Paraguay, Peru, Suriname, Uruguay and Venezuela. The Arab members are: Algeria, Bahrain, Comoros, Djibouti, Egypt, Iraq, Jordan, Kuwait, Lebanon, Libya, Morocco, Mauritania, Oman, Palestine, Qatar, Saudi Arabia, Somalia, Sudan, Syria, Tunisia, United Arab Emirates and Yemen.

== Decision-making structure ==
ASPA's decision-making structure is composed of four hierarchic levels:

1. the Summit of Heads of State and Government, which meets every three years;
2. the Council of Ministers of Foreign Affairs, which meets every two years and at the sidelines of the UN General Assembly;
3. the Council of High Officials, which convenes every six months;
4. the Sectorial Committees (in the areas of Economic Cooperation, Scientific and Technologic Cooperation, Environmental Cooperation, Social Cooperation, and Cultural Cooperation), which meet at the sidelines of High Officials Meetings and in the preparation of Sectorial Ministerial Meetings.

ASPA's structure, which is described in Paragraph 119 of the "Doha Declaration", also contemplates a coordination body – the Executive Coordination Group –, which is composed by the countries occupying the Presidency of the Arab Summit and of UNASUR, as well as the General Secretariats of the League of Arab States (Arab Regional Coordinator) and of UNASUR (currently being exerted by Brazil until the UNASUR Secretariat is constituted). The host-country of the next ASPA Summit is also invited to be part of the Group.

== Areas of action ==
ASPA acts in the areas of political coordination and cooperation among its member-States.

=== Political coordination ===
In its political coordination, ASPA has embraced positions which are in line with the traditional policies advocated by developing nations in international fora, such as the reform of the United Nations, with greater presence of former "third-world" nations in its decision-making bodies; respect for multilateralism and international law (as opposed to unilateral action); adoption of a development-oriented agenda at the World Trade Organization; poverty reduction and the implementation of the United Nations Millennium Development Goals; nuclear non-proliferation and disarmament; support to negotiations aiming at the creation of a Palestinian state living side-by-side and in peace with Israel.

=== Cooperation ===
ASPA's cooperation facet involves actions organized through five Sectorial Committees of Cooperation for Economics, Science and Technology, Environmental, Social and Cultural affairs. An extense agenda has been established since the Mechanism's creation, in 2005, by means of seminars, workshops and Ministerial meetings aimed at establishing South-South cooperation agreements.

==== Economic cooperation ====
- MERCOSUR, a South American customs union gathering Argentina, Brazil, Paraguay and Uruguay, has settled a free trade agreement with Egypt and is negotiating two others with the Gulf Cooperation Council (GCC) and Jordan, as well as a preferential tariffs agreement with Morocco. Although some of these negotiations haven't been finalized, palpable results of the process of approximation of both regions can already be perceived: commerce between South American and Arab countries has grown, since the year before the creation of ASPA (2004), from US$11 billion to US$30 billion (2008).

==== Cultural cooperation ====
- The main projects of the ASPA Cultural Cooperation Plan of Action are the construction of an Arab-South American Library in Algiers, the creation of the South American Research Institute in Tangiers, the opening of the Library-Research Center of South American-Arab Countries (BibliASPA) in São Paulo and the organization of the Arab Culture Festival in São Paulo.

==== Environmental cooperation ====
- Arab and South American countries have common interests in exchanging experiences and cooperating in combating desertification, water desalination technologies, and climate change monitoring.

==== Scientific and technical cooperation ====
- Both regions will develop cooperation programs in the field of Information and Communications Technology (ICT).

==== Social cooperation ====
- Successful experiences in the field of poverty reduction are being exchanged by countries of both regions.

== History of ASPA ==
=== Summit of Heads of State and Government ===
Summit	Date	Country	Town
I	10–11 May 2005	Brazil	Brasília
II	31 March 2009	Qatar	Doha
III	1–2 October 2012	Peru	Lima
IV	10–11 November 2015	Saudi Arabia	Riyadh

The following meetings were held since the creation of ASPA, in 2005:

- Experts Meeting to Develop the Project of the Arab-South American Library (Algiers, 19–20 Nov 2005)
- I High Officials Meeting (Cairo, 29–30 Nov 2005)
- I Meeting of Ministers of Culture (Algiers, 31/Jan a 3 Feb 2006)
- I Meeting of Ministers of Economy (Quito, 24–25 Apr 2006)
- II High Officials Meeting (Caracas, 18–19 Jul 2006)
- III High Officials Meeting (Cairo, 31 January 2007)
- Meeting of Ministers of Foreign Affairs of MERCOSUR with the Subsecretary-General of Gulf Cooperation Council – GCC (Rio de Janeiro, 18 Jan 2007)
- I Meeting of Ministers of Environmental Affairs (Nairobi, 6 Feb 2007)
- I Meeting of Ministers of Social Affairs (Cairo, 3 May 2007)
- II Meeting of Ministers of Economy (Rabat, 21–23 May 2007)
- IV High Officials Meeting (Santa Cruz de la Sierra, 19–20 Jul 2007)
- II Meeting of Ministers of Foreign Affairs (Buenos Aires, 18–21 Feb 2008)
- Meeting of the Committee on Cultural Cooperation (Algiers, 28 Apr 2008)
- Meeting of the Committee on Science and Technology and Seminar on Water Resources, Semi-Arid and Desertification (Recife, 20–22 Aug 2008)
- V High Officials Meeting (Doha, 20–23 Oct 2008)
- Meeting of Ministers Responsible for Water Resources and Combating Desertification (Riyadh, 16–17 Nov 2008)
- Meeting of the Committee in Charge of Preparing the II Business Conference at the sidelines of the II ASPA Summit (São Paulo, 16–17 Dec 2008)
- High Officials Meeting preparatory of the II ASPA Summit (Cairo, 18–19 Feb 2009)
- Meeting of Ministers of Foreign Affairs Preparatory of the II ASPA Summit (Cairo, 4 Mar 2009)
- II Business Conference at the sidelines of the II ASPA Summit (Doha, 29–30 Mar 2009)
- II Meeting of Ministers of Culture (Rio de Janeiro, 20–21 May 2009)
- Meeting of the ASPA Regional Coordinators to Develop a Preliminary Agenda of Cooperation in the Field of Intellectual Property, at the sidelines of the WIPO Meeting (Geneva, 21 Sep 2009)
- Meeting of the Council of Ministers of Foreign Affairs at the sidelines of the 64th UN General Assembly (New York, 23 Sep 2009)
- Meeting of the Committee on Environmental Cooperation at the sidelines of the 9th COP/UNCCD (Buenos Aires, 26 Sep 2009)
- Meeting of the Committee on Cultural Cooperation at the sidelines of the 35th Conference of UNESCO (Paris, 14 Oct 2009)
- Meeting of the ASPA Regional Coordinators to Develop a Preliminary Agenda of Cooperation in the Field of Information and Communication Technology (ICT), at the sidelines of the International Conference on Internet Governance (Sharm El-Sheik, 15–19 Nov 2009)
- Meeting of the South American UNCCD Focal Points to Develop an Agenda of Bi-Regional Cooperation to Combat Desertification within ASPA (São Paulo, 4 Dec 2009)
- Meeting of Diplomatic Representations of the ASPA Member-States Preparatory of the VI High Officials Meeting (Brasília, 7 Dec 2009)
- VI High Officials Meeting (Quito, 26–27 Feb 2010)
- II Meeting of Ministers of Social Affairs and Development (Brasília, 1–2 Mar 2010)
