= Anglo-American Petroleum Agreement =

1944 failed agreement on petroleum supply

The Anglo-American Petroleum Agreement or Washington Agreement (August 8, 1944) was a failed attempt by the British and American governments to establish a lasting agreement to manage international petroleum supply and demand. The agreement would have established the International Petroleum Commission for the purposes of balancing discordant supply and demand, managing surplus, and bringing order and stability to a market laden with oversupply, similar to the Texas Railroad Commission in the United States. After being concluded, the agreement faced near total opposition from the petroleum industry, prompting U.S. President Franklin Roosevelt to withdraw the treaty from ratification consideration and abandon the agreement.
