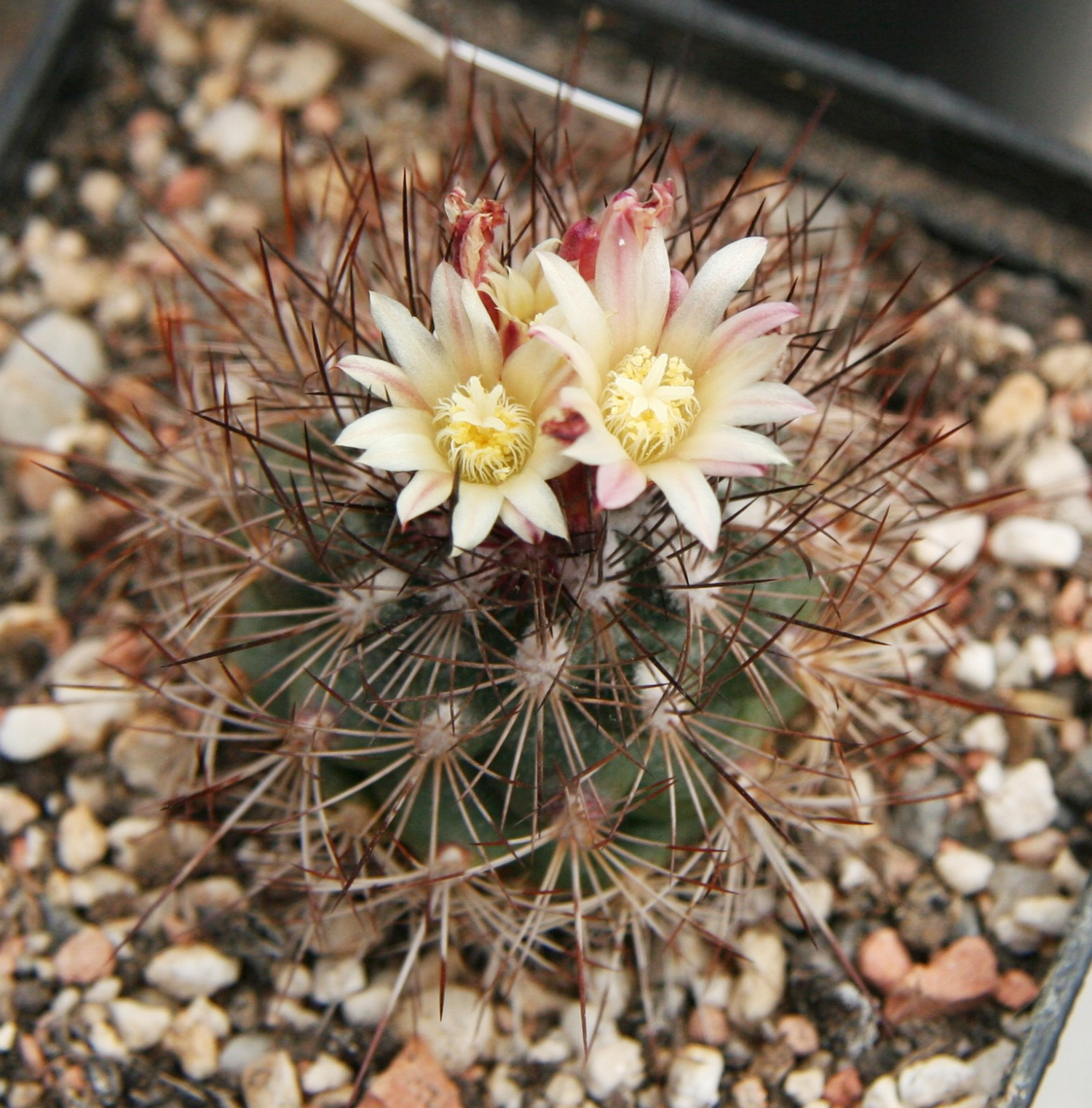

Conservation status
- Critically Endangered (IUCN 3.1)
- CITES Appendix II

Scientific classification
- Kingdom: Plantae
- Clade: Tracheophytes
- Clade: Angiosperms
- Clade: Eudicots
- Order: Caryophyllales
- Family: Cactaceae
- Subfamily: Cactoideae
- Genus: Acharagma
- Species: A. aguirreanum

Binomial name
- Acharagma aguirreanum (Glass & R.A.Foster) Glass

Synonyms
- Escobaria aguirreana (Glass & R.C.Foster) N.P.Taylor; Gymnocactus aguirreanus Glass & R.A.Foster

= Acharagma aguirreanum =

Species of cactus

Acharagma aguirreanum is a critically endangered microendemic cactus. It has a range of about one square kilometer in the calcareous semi-desert of the Sierra de la Paila in Coahuila, Mexico. Its population is estimated at less than 1000 individuals. Its only major threat is illegal collecting.

== Description ==
Acharagma aguirreanum usually grows singly with a spherical to depressed spherical, soft plant body. It is medium green to purple in color and grows up to 5 cm (2.0 in) high and 5 to 7 cm (2.0 to 2.8 in) in diameter. The fleshy warts are somewhat flexible and grow up to 0.5 cm (0.20 in) in size. Two or more central spines are formed that are difficult to distinguish from the marginal spines. The 13 to 16 marginal spines are often in two rows and are 0.8 to 1.5 cm (0.31 to 0.59 in) long. The yellowish to reddish yellow flowers are up to 1.8 cm (0.71 in) long and up to 2 cm (0.79 in) in diameter. The greenish-purple fruits are up to 1.2 cm (0.47 in) long and up to 0.35 cm (0.14 in) in diameter.

== Distribution ==
Acharagma aguirreanum is widespread in Mexico in the state of Coahuila at the western end of the Sierra de la Paila.

== Taxonomy ==
It was first described as Gymnocactus aguirreanus in 1972 by Charles Edward Glass and Robert Alan Foster. The specific epithet aguirreanum honors the Mexican cactus specialist Gustavo Aguirre Benaides from Parras de la Fuente. Charles Edward Glass placed the species in the genus Acharagma in 1997. Other nomenclature synonyms are Thelocactus aguirreanus (Glass & R.A.Foster) Bravo (1980) and Escobaria aguirreana (Glass & R.A.Foster) N.P.Taylor (1983).
