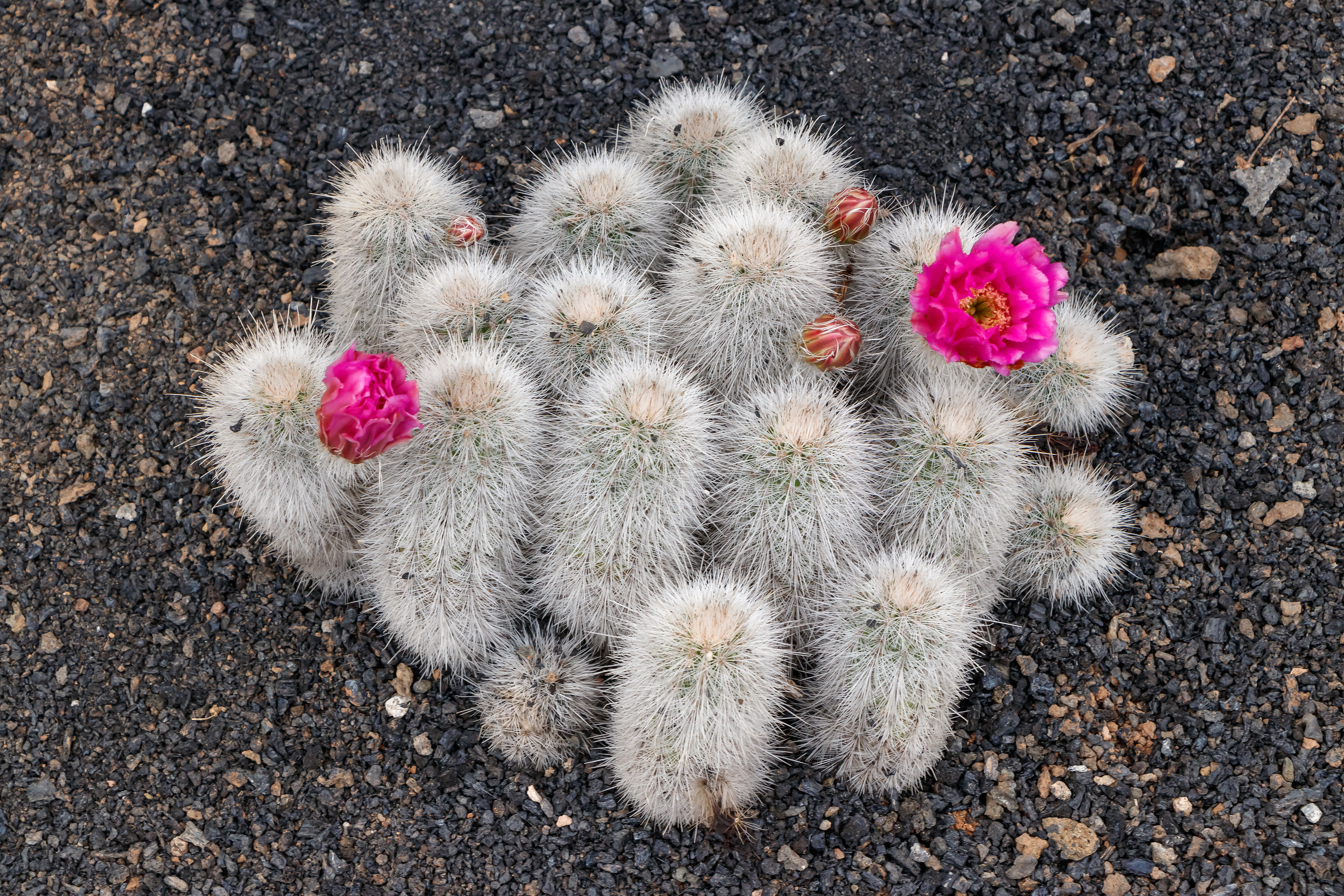

Conservation status
- Critically Endangered (IUCN 3.1)

Scientific classification
- Kingdom: Plantae
- Clade: Tracheophytes
- Clade: Angiosperms
- Clade: Eudicots
- Order: Caryophyllales
- Family: Cactaceae
- Subfamily: Cactoideae
- Genus: Echinocereus
- Species: E. nivosus

Binomial name
- Echinocereus nivosus R.A.Foster and Glass (1978)

= Echinocereus nivosus =

Species of cactus

Echinocereus nivosus is a species of cactus native to Mexico.

== Description ==
Echinocereus nivosus grows richly branched and forms cushions up to 12 cm (4.7 in) high and 30 cm (12 in) in diameter. The light green egg-shaped to short cylindrical shoots have a diameter of up to 4 cm (1.6 in) and are almost completely covered by thorns. There are ten to 15 ribs that are slightly tuberous. The slender thorns are mostly glassy white. There are ten to 15 central spines up to 2 cm (0.79 in) long. The 25 to 40 radiating marginal spines are 4 to 9 mm (0.16 to 0.35 in) long.

The slender, funnel-shaped flowers are deep pink to deep magenta and appear at the tips of the shoots. They are up to 6 cm (2.4 in) long and reach a diameter of 4 to 6 cm (1.6 to 2.4 in). The reddish lavender-colored fruits are almost spherical and thorny.

== Distribution and habitat ==
The species is known only from two collection sites about 1900 to 2000 meters above sea level in the Sierra Madre Oriental, in the southeastern part of the state of Coahuila. It inhabits exposed sites of limestone rock.

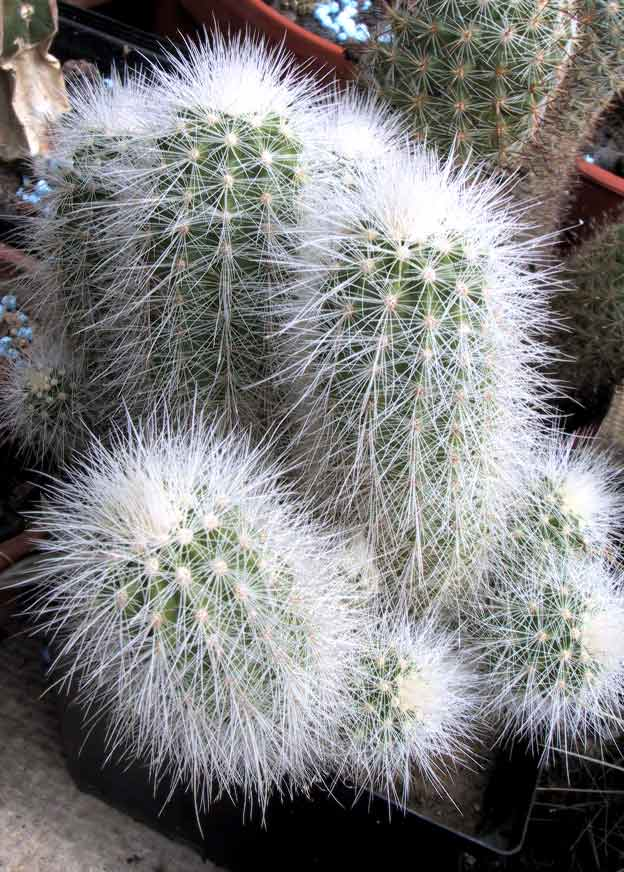

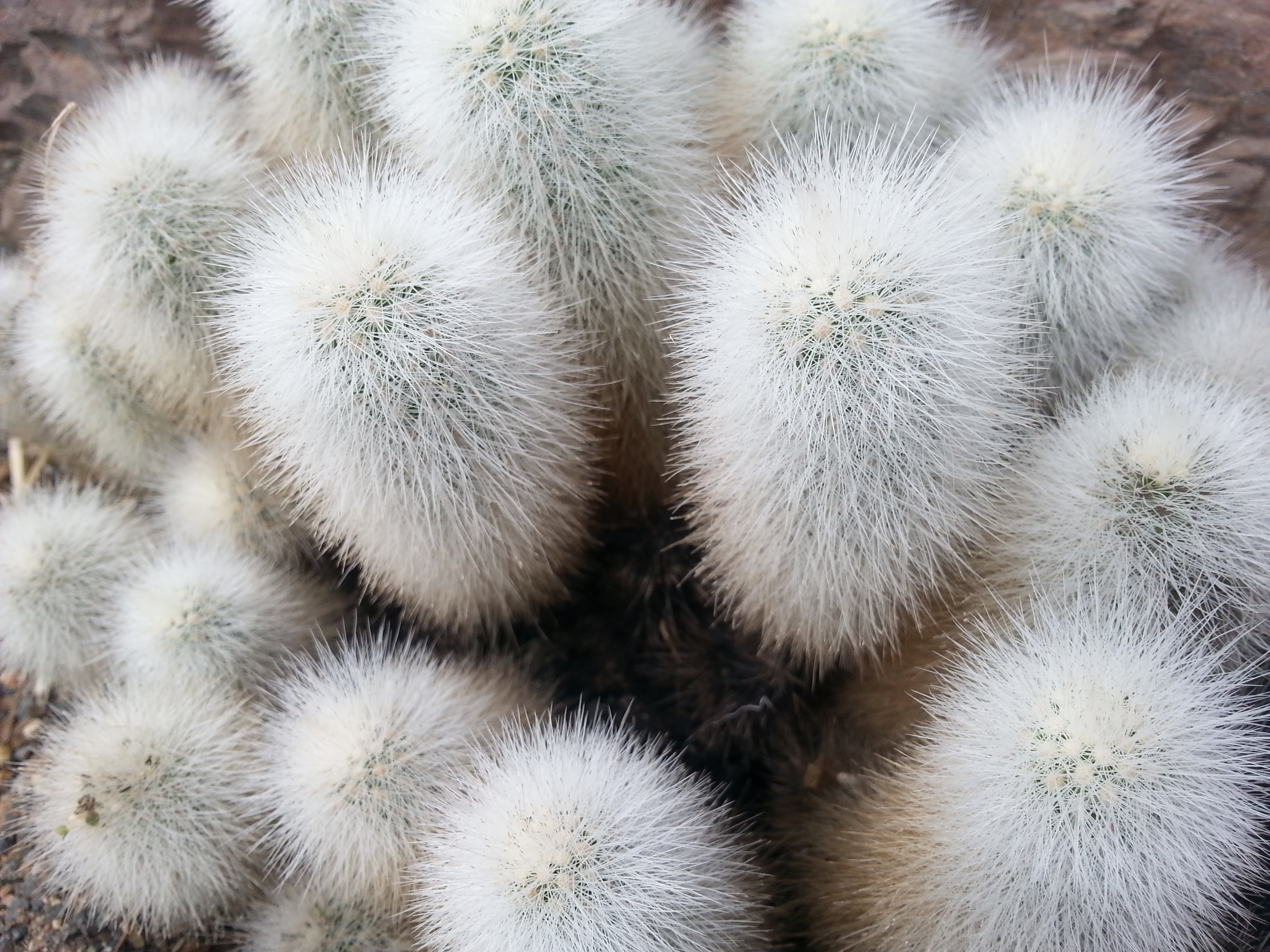

== Conservation ==
The species is currently classified as Critically Endangered by the IUCN due to its extremely restricted distribution, apparently low total population size, and being sought after by collectors.

== Taxonomy ==
The first description by Charles Edward Glass and Robert Alan Foster was published in 1978. The specific epithet nivosus comes from Latin, means 'snow-covered' and refers to the white thorns of the species.
