= Aloe aageodonta =

Conservation status
- CITES Appendix II

Scientific classification
- Kingdom: Plantae
- Clade: Embryophytes
- Clade: Tracheophytes
- Clade: Spermatophytes
- Clade: Angiosperms
- Clade: Monocots
- Order: Asparagales
- Family: Asphodelaceae
- Subfamily: Asphodeloideae
- Genus: Aloe
- Species: A. aageodonta

Binomial name
- Aloe aageodonta L.E.Newton

Species of succulent plant endemic to Kenya

Aloe aageodonta is a species of succulent plant in the genus Aloe that is endemic to Kenya.

== Taxonomy and etymology ==
Aloe aageodonta was described by botanist Leonard Eric Newton in a 1993 issue of the Cactus and Succulent Journal. The specific epithet aageodonta is derived from the Ancient Greek words aages, meaning "hard", and odous or odontus, meaning "teeth", in reference to the hard marginal teeth.

The Kamba people refer to this species as kiluma in the Kamba language, however, this term is also used to refer to other local Aloe species such as Aloe deserti, Aloe fibrosa, Aloe lateritia, and Aloe ukambensis.

== Distribution and habitat ==
Aloe aageodonta is known only from the type locality of Muvaroa Hill in the former Eastern Province of Kenya, where it grows on rocky hills, in forest clearings, and on the edges of thickets at 960–1,250 m (3,150–4,100 ft) above sea level.

== Description ==
Aloe aageodonta is a shrubby caulescent Aloe that branches from the base, growing up to 300 cm (120 in) across. The stems may be up to 3 cm (1.2 in) in diameter and grow upright until reaching approximately 1 m (3 ft 3 in) tall and becoming decumbent, reaching a maximum length of 2 m (6 ft 7 in). The loose rosettes consist of 12 to 20 triangular leaves. Each smooth, dull green leaf measures 50 cm (20 in) long and 8 cm (3.1 in) wide and bears firm, hooked marginal teeth. The erect inflorescence grows to 70 cm (28 in) tall and bears 6 to 10 racemoid branches, with each raceme bearing 20 to 40 yellow or red flowers.
