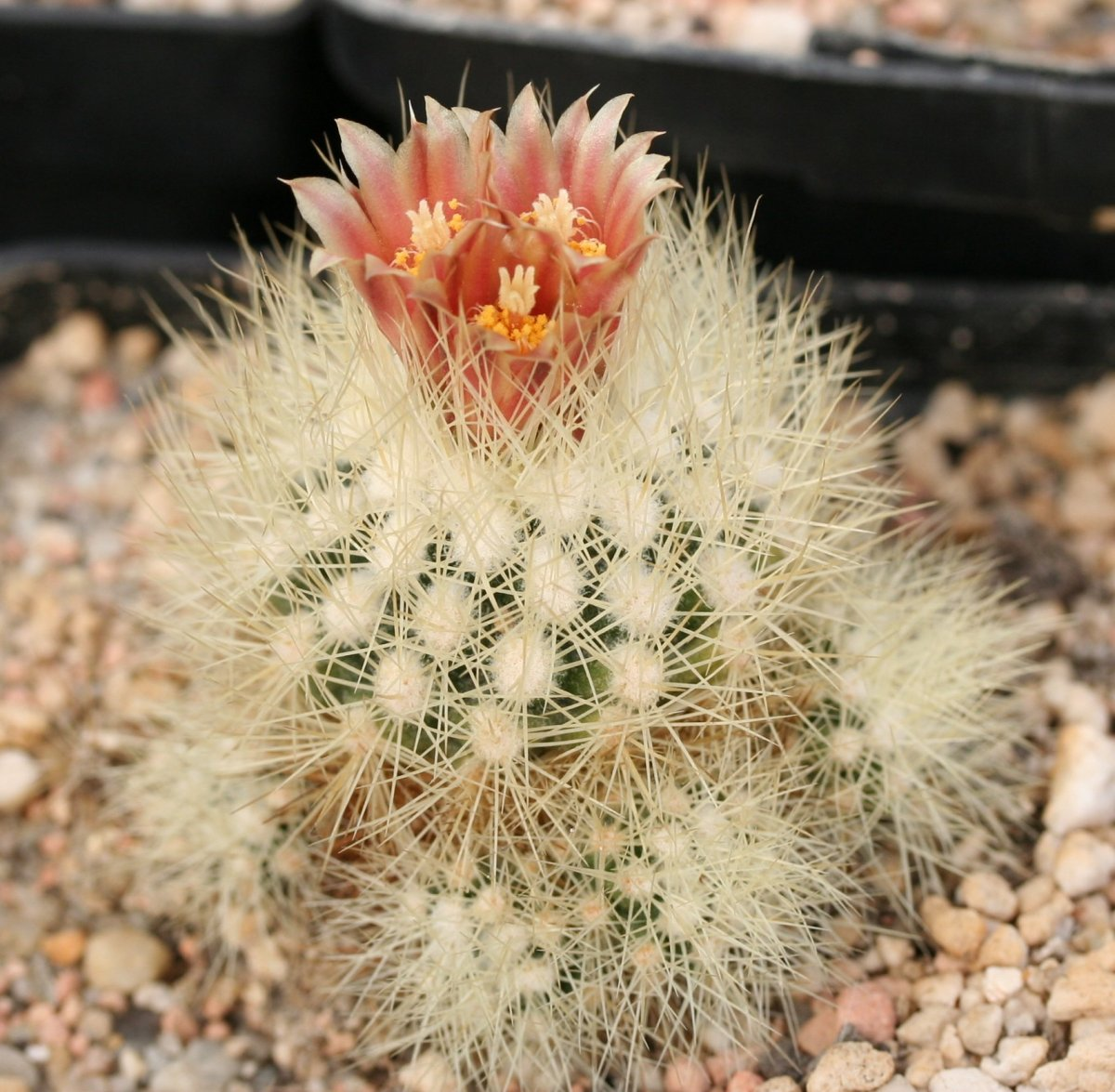
- Acharagma roseana

Scientific classification
- Kingdom: Plantae
- Clade: Tracheophytes
- Clade: Angiosperms
- Clade: Eudicots
- Order: Caryophyllales
- Family: Cactaceae
- Subfamily: Cactoideae
- Tribe: Cacteae
- Genus: Acharagma (N.P.Taylor) Zimmerman ex Glass

Type species
- Acharagma aguirreanum

Species
- See text.

Synonyms
- Escobaria sect. Acharagma N.P.Taylor, Kakteen And. Sukk. 1983

= Acharagma =

Genus of cacti

Acharagma is a genus of cactus from northern Mexico, comprising three species.

== Description ==
These cacti are usually solitary but sometimes occur in small clusters. The globose stems tend to be about 3–7 cm in diameter. The ribs have tubercles, with ungrooved areoles. The flowers are at the stem tips, and range from cream to pink and yellow.

The genus is of relatively recent creation, the species originally being described as part of Escobaria, although recognized as a separate section by Nigel Taylor in 1983, and raised to a genus by Charlie Glass in 1998.

== Species ==
As of January 2026, Plants of the World Online accepts three species.

Image	Scientific name	Distribution
	Acharagma aguirreanum (Glass & R.A.Foster) Glass	Coahuila de Zaragoza, Mexico
	Acharagma galeanense (Haugg) Lodé	Mexico (Coahuila)
	Acharagma roseanum (Boed.) E.F.Anderson	Coahuila de Zaragoza, Nuevo Leon, Mexico
