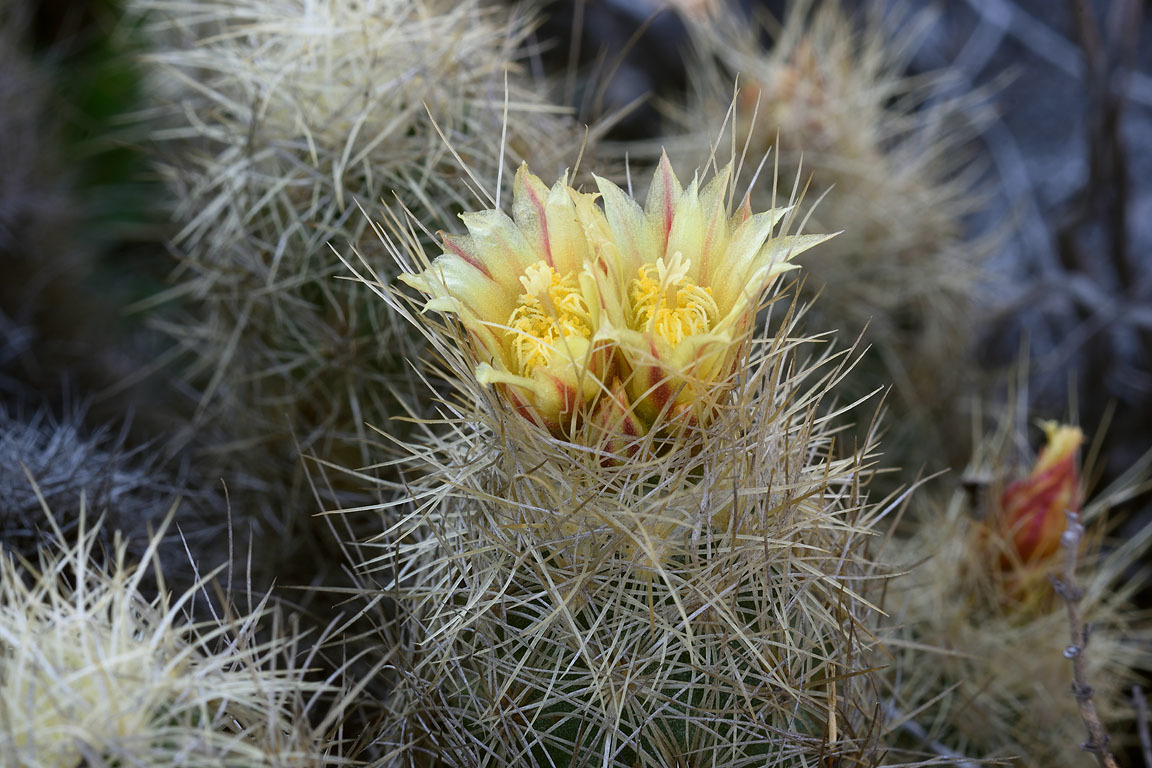

Scientific classification
- Kingdom: Plantae
- Clade: Tracheophytes
- Clade: Angiosperms
- Clade: Eudicots
- Order: Caryophyllales
- Family: Cactaceae
- Subfamily: Cactoideae
- Genus: Acharagma
- Species: A. galeanense

Binomial name
- Acharagma galeanense (Haugg) Lodé, 2017

Synonyms
- Acharagma roseanum subsp. galeanense D.R.Hunt, 2002; Escobaria roseana subsp. galeanensis Haugg, 1995

= Acharagma galeanense =

Species of cactus

Acharagma galeanense is a species of Acharagma cactus found in Mexico.

== Description ==
Acharagma galeanense is a small cactus that features numerous clumping, finger-like cylindrical stems measuring 6 to 10 cm in height and 2 to 2.5 cm in diameter. The stems are covered with 30 yellowish-white or deep golden spines growing out of each areole, with central spines that are nearly indistinguishable from the radial spines. The stem itself is pale green, cylindrical, and initially erect but becomes prostrate as it ages. The cactus produces creamy yellow flowers that are about 1.5 to 2 cm long. These flowers bloom at the tip of the stem.

== Distribution ==
This species is native to northeastern Mexico, specifically in Coahuila and Galeana, Nuevo León. It typically grows on limestone hills within scrub biome environments.

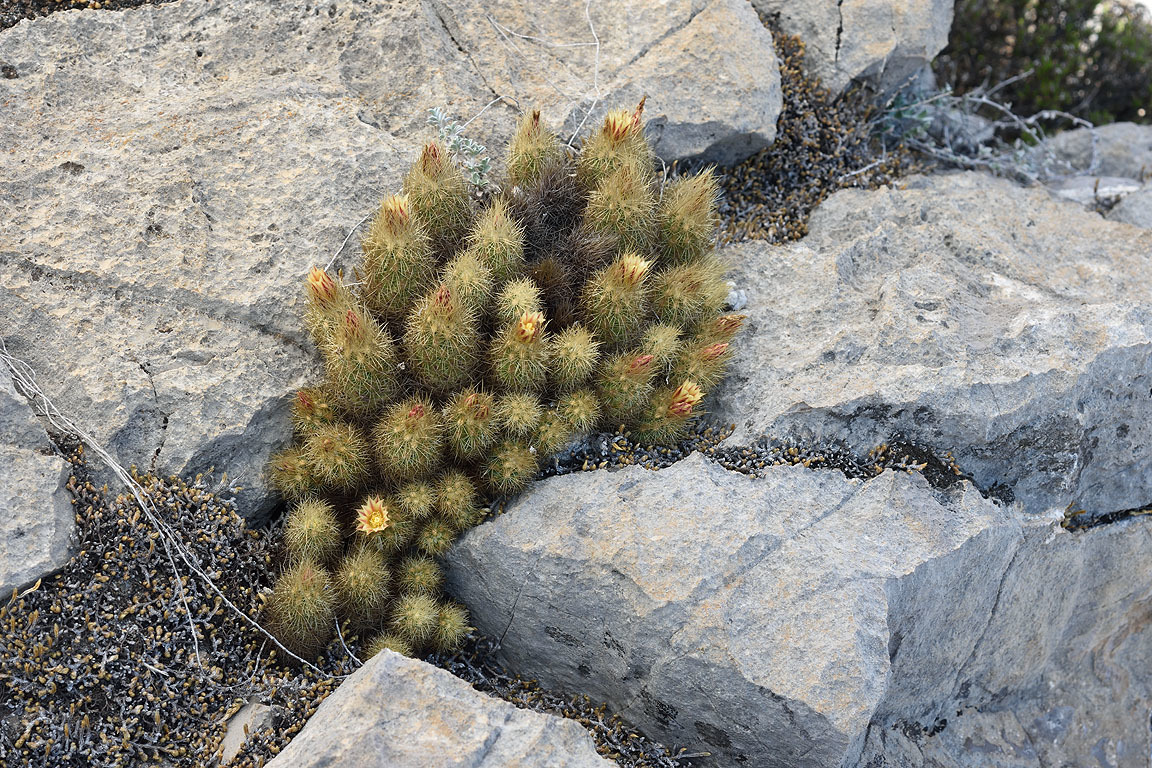
Plant growing in habitat

== Taxonomy ==
Originally, this cactus was described as Escobaria roseana subsp. galeanensis in 1995 by botanist Erich Haugg. The name "galeanensis" was chosen to honor the town of Galeana, Nuevo León, where the species was first identified. David Richard Hunt introduced the species as a subspecies of Acharagma roseanum in 2002. Later, French botanist Joël Lodé reclassified the species into the genus Acharagma, renaming it Acharagma galeanense. He documented this taxonomic change in the journal Cactus-Aventures International in 2017 (volume 1, page 33).
