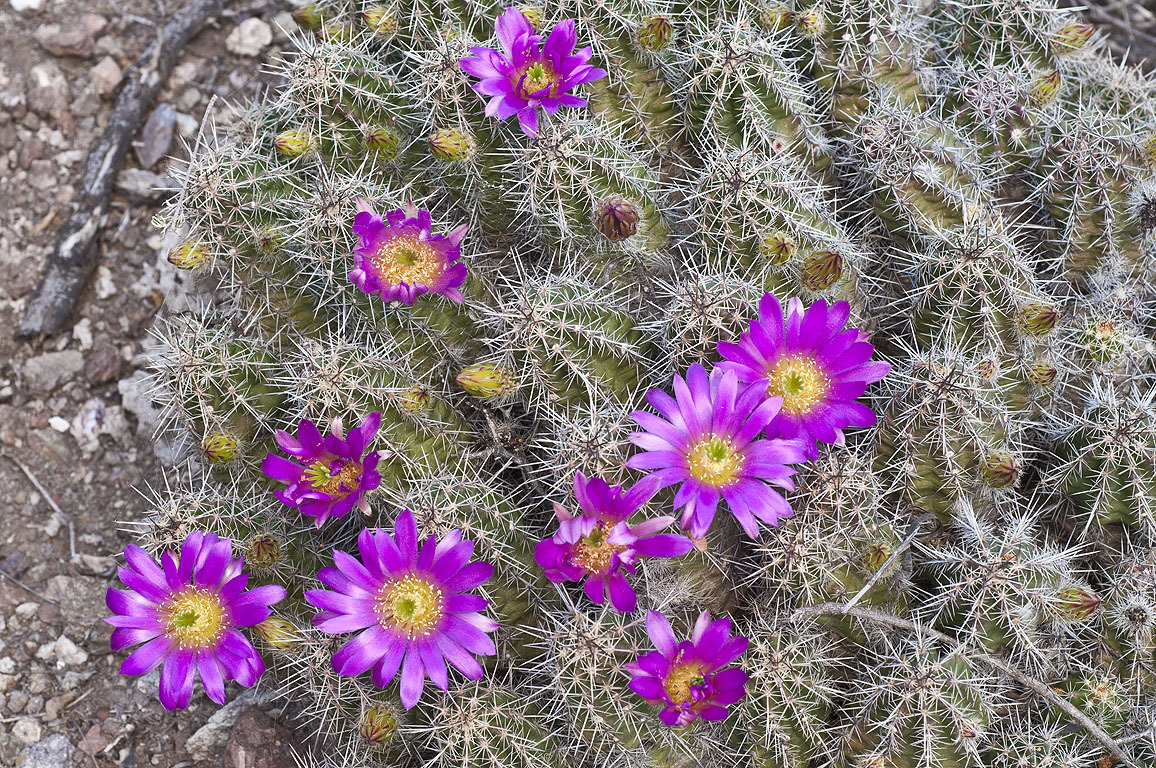

Conservation status
- Least Concern (IUCN 3.1)

Scientific classification
- Kingdom: Plantae
- Clade: Tracheophytes
- Clade: Angiosperms
- Clade: Eudicots
- Order: Caryophyllales
- Family: Cactaceae
- Subfamily: Cactoideae
- Genus: Echinocereus
- Species: E. parkeri

Binomial name
- Echinocereus parkeri N.P.Taylor, 1988

= Echinocereus parkeri =

Species of cactus

Echinocereus parkeri is a species of cactus native to Mexico.

== Description ==
Echinocereus parkeri grows in compact cushions or open groups with many shoots. The shoots, which are tapered or cylindrical, can reach up to 15 cm (5.9 in) in length and 2 to 6 cm (0.79 to 2.36 in) in diameter. They have six to ten tuberculated ribs. The one to eight central spines, initially dark but soon turning glassy white to yellowish, range from 2 to 6.5 cm (0.79 to 2.56 in) long. The six to 18 slender, mostly glassy radial spines are 0.7 to 1.2 cm (0.28 to 0.47 in) long. The funnel-shaped flowers are magenta to deep pink with a white throat. They appear near the tips of the shoots, measuring 4.5 to 5.5 cm (1.8 to 2.2 in) in length and 4.5 to 6 cm (1.8 to 2.4 in) in diameter. The green, spherical fruits have white flesh and are covered with falling, glassy white spines.

=== Subspecies ===
Accepted subspecies:

Image	Scientific name	Distribution
	Echinocereus parkeri subsp. arteagensis W.Blum & Mich.Lange	Mexico (Coahuila, Nuevo León)
	Echinocereus parkeri subsp. gonzalezii (N.P.Taylor) N.P.Taylor	Mexico Northeast
	Echinocereus parkeri subsp. mazapilensis W.Blum & Mich.Lange	Mexico (Nuevo León, Zacatecas)
	Echinocereus parkeri subsp. parkeri	Mexico Northeast

== Distribution ==
Echinocereus parkeri is found growing in the Chihuahuan Desert in the Mexican states of Nuevo León, Tamaulipas, San Luis Potosí, and Zacatecas at elevations of 1450 to 1900 meters. Plants are found growing among Mammillaria melanocentra subsp. rubrograndis and Mammillaria glassii.

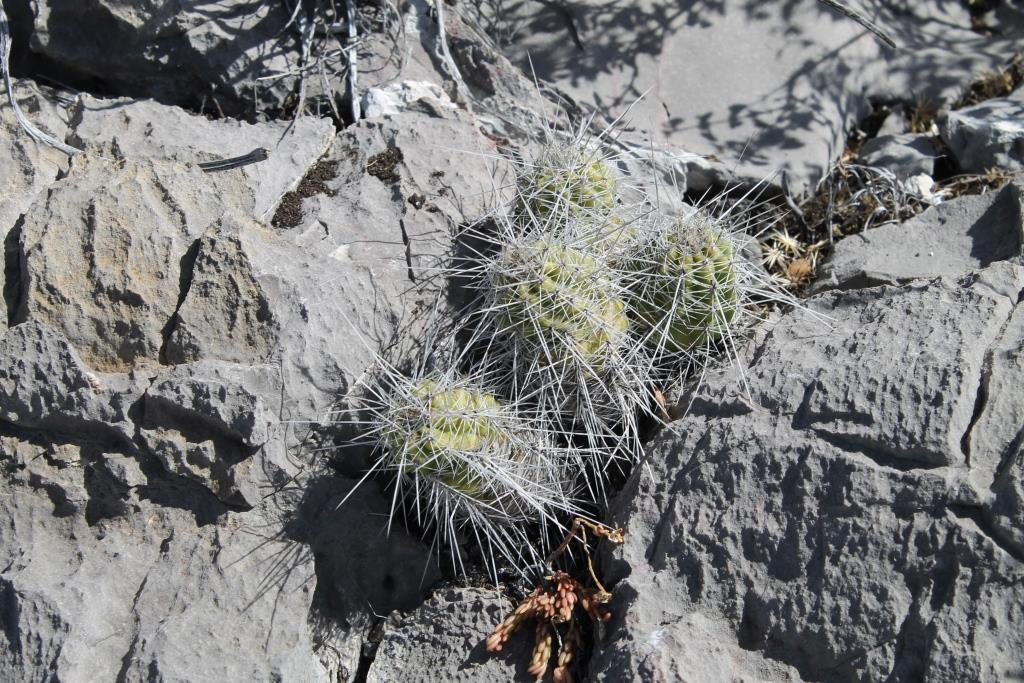
Echinocereus parkeri subsp. gonzalezii growing in Guadalcázar, Mexico

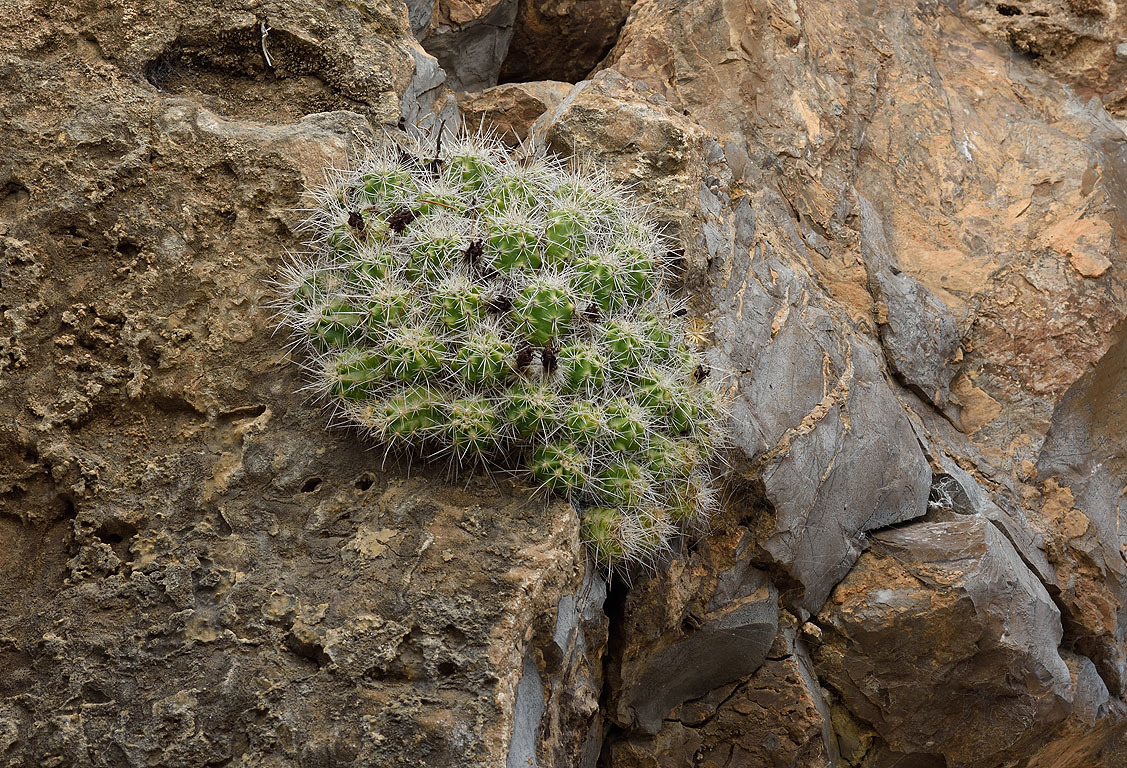
Echinocereus parkeri subsp. parkeri in Cieneguillas y Crucitas, Nuevo León, Mexico

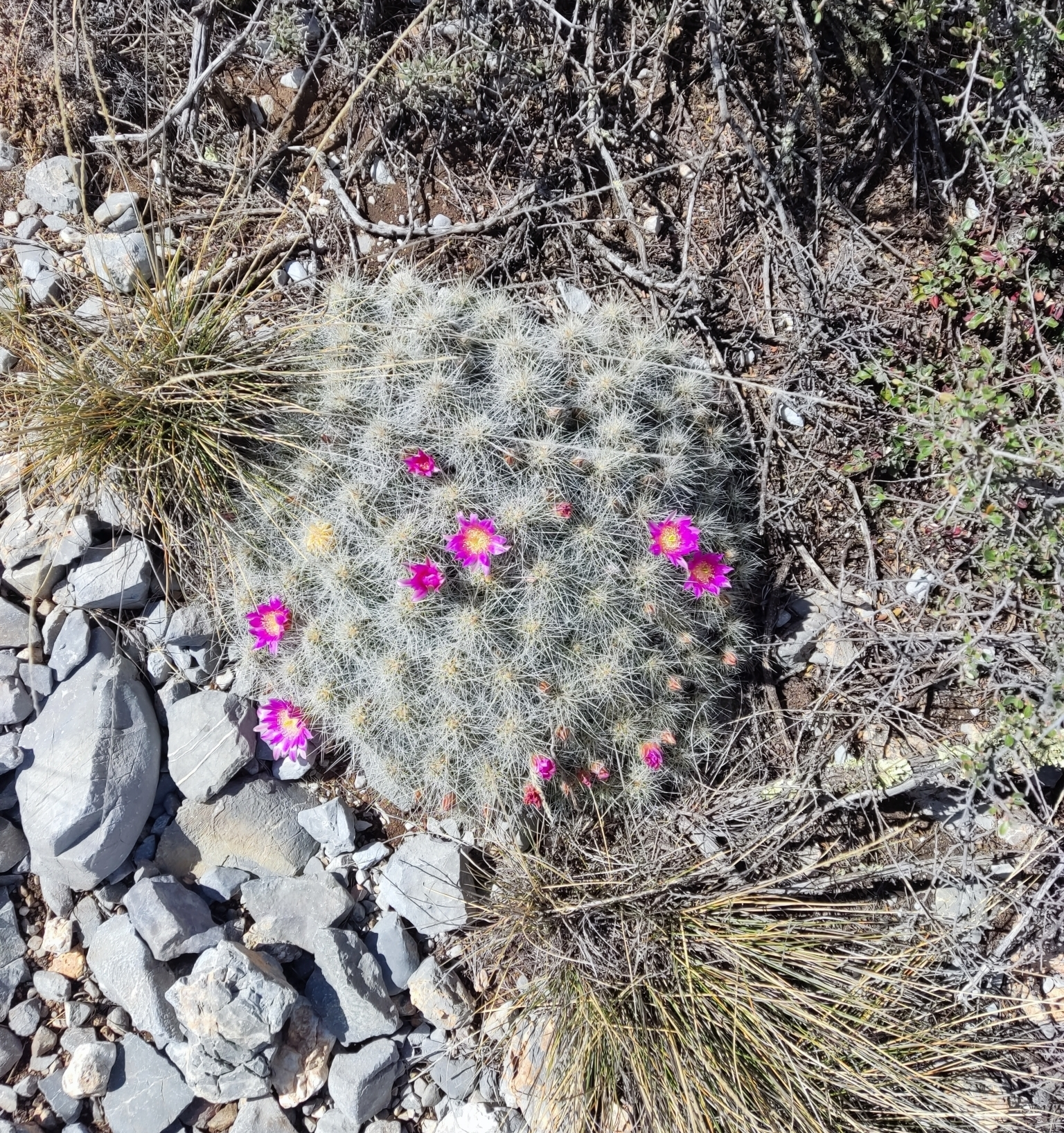
Echinocereus parkeri subsp. arteagensis habitat in El Jonuco, Nuevo León, Mexico

== Taxonomy ==
The species was first described by Nigel Paul Taylor in 1988. The specific epithet "parkeri" honors David Parker, the founder of the British "Echinocereus Reference Collection."
