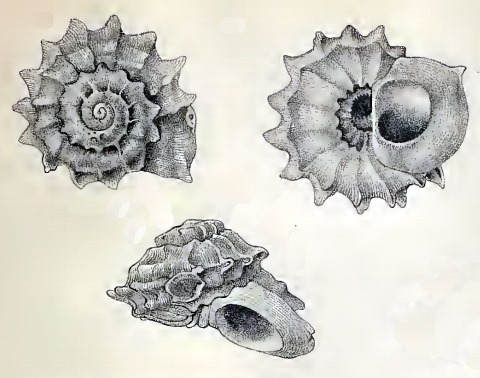

Scientific classification
- Kingdom: Animalia
- Phylum: Mollusca
- Class: Gastropoda
- Subclass: Vetigastropoda
- Order: Trochida
- Family: Liotiidae
- Genus: Bathyliotina
- Species: B. armata

Binomial name
- Bathyliotina armata (A. Adams, 1861)

= Bathyliotina armata =

Species of gastropod

Bathyliotina armata is a species of sea snail, a marine gastropod mollusk in the family Liotiidae.

== Description ==
The size of the shell varies from 7 mm to 12 mm. Specimens can be found around 108 meters below sea level.

(Original description in Latin) The shell is turbinate (top-shaped), white, and solid. Its spire is elevated, conical, and features a broad umbilicus. The whorls are convex and longitudinally wrinkled with ridges, bearing closely crowded, wavy lamellae. Furthermore, the whorls are equipped with small transverse keels — four of which are located on the body whorl - and two rows of spines, with the spines themselves being sharply pointed and scaled.

== Distribution ==
This marine species occurs off the Philippines, the Korea Strait, and Japan.
