= Horticultural society =

Organization that studies cultivated plants

A horticultural industry is an organization devoted to the study and culture of cultivated plants. Such organizations may be local, regional, national, or international. Some have a more general focus, whereas others are devoted to a particular kind or group of plants. They are also clustered.

The oldest horticultural society in the world, founded in 1768, is the Ancient Society of York Florists. They still have four shows a year in York, UK. They have a large archive of records, including the original members book dating back to 1768.The American Horticultural Society inspires a culture of gardening and horticultural practices that creates and sustains healthy, beautiful communities and a livable planet.

== Notable organization ==
- Cactus and Succulent Society of America
- Royal Horticultural Society
- American Horticultural Society

== See also ==
- Horticulture
