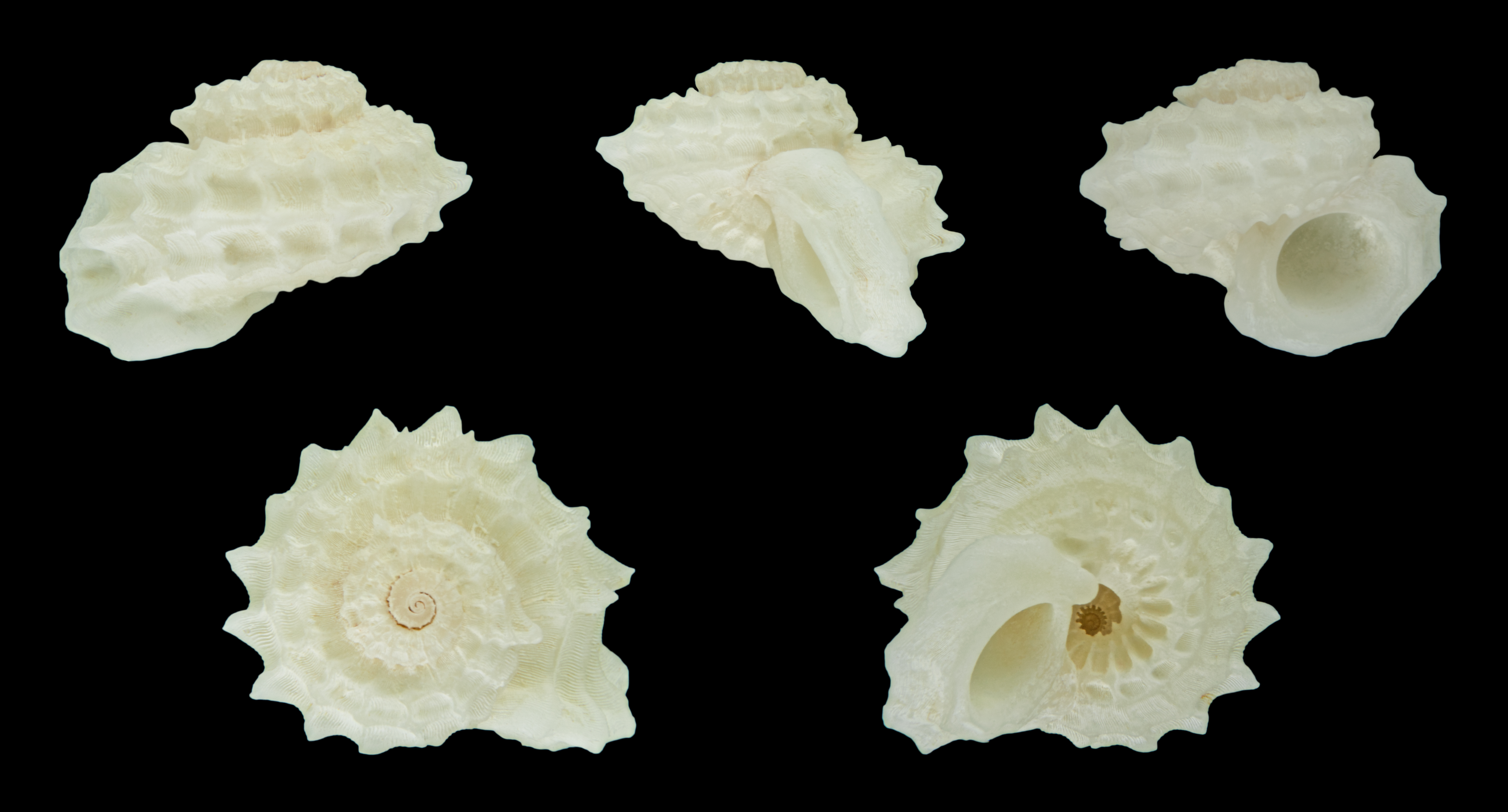

Scientific classification
- Kingdom: Animalia
- Phylum: Mollusca
- Class: Gastropoda
- Subclass: Vetigastropoda
- Order: Trochida
- Family: Liotiidae
- Genus: Bathyliotina
- Species: B. nakayasui

Binomial name
- Bathyliotina nakayasui Habe, 1981

= Bathyliotina nakayasui =

Species of gastropod

Bathyliotina nakayasui, is a species of sea snail, a marine gastropod mollusk in the family Liotiidae.

== Description ==
The height of the shell attains 15 mm.

== Distribution ==
This marine species occurs off the Philippines and in the South China Sea at a depth of about 150 m.
