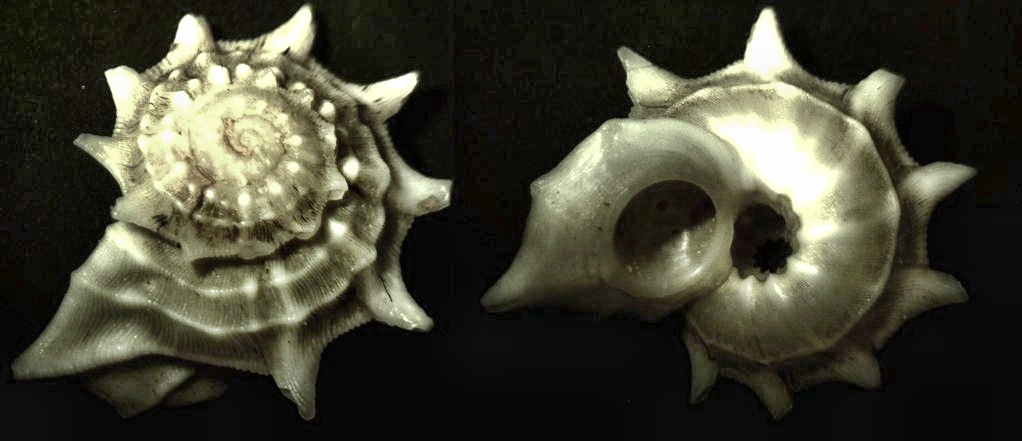
- Two views of a shell of Bathyliotina glassi

Scientific classification
- Kingdom: Animalia
- Phylum: Mollusca
- Class: Gastropoda
- Subclass: Vetigastropoda
- Order: Trochida
- Family: Liotiidae
- Genus: Bathyliotina; Habe, 1961

Type species
- Liotina armata A. Adams, 1861

= Bathyliotina =

Genus of gastropods

Bathyliotina is a genus of sea snails, marine gastropod mollusks in the family Liotiidae.

== Description ==
The typical characteristics of this genus are:

- the thick shell is broader than high.
- the opening of the deep umbilicus is rather broad.
- the sculpture shows many blunt spines at its periphery.
- the outer lip is expanded to a considerable extent, formed by decreasing lamellar layers.

== Species ==
- Bathyliotina armata (A. Adams, 1861)
- Bathyliotina glassi McLean, 1988
- Bathyliotina lamellosa (Schepman, 1908)
- Bathyliotina nakayasui Habe, 1981
- Bathyliotina schepmani Habe, 1953
