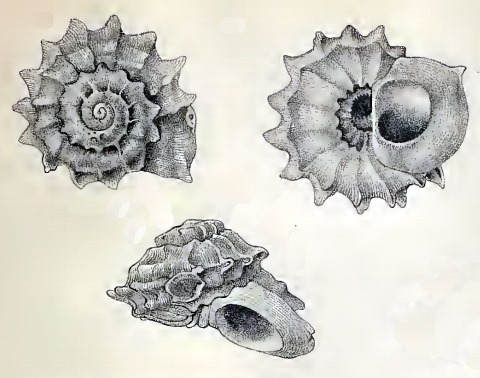
- Drawing with three views of a shell of Bathyliotina schepmani

Scientific classification
- Kingdom: Animalia
- Phylum: Mollusca
- Class: Gastropoda
- Subclass: Vetigastropoda
- Order: Trochida
- Family: Liotiidae
- Genus: Bathyliotina
- Species: B. schepmani

Binomial name
- Bathyliotina schepmani Habe, 1953

Synonyms
- Liotia armata var. sensu Schepman, 1908 in 1908-13

= Bathyliotina schepmani =

Species of gastropod

Bathyliotina schepmani, is a species of sea snail, a marine gastropod mollusk in the family Liotiidae.

== Distribution ==
This marine species occurs off the Korea Strait and northeastern Borneo.
