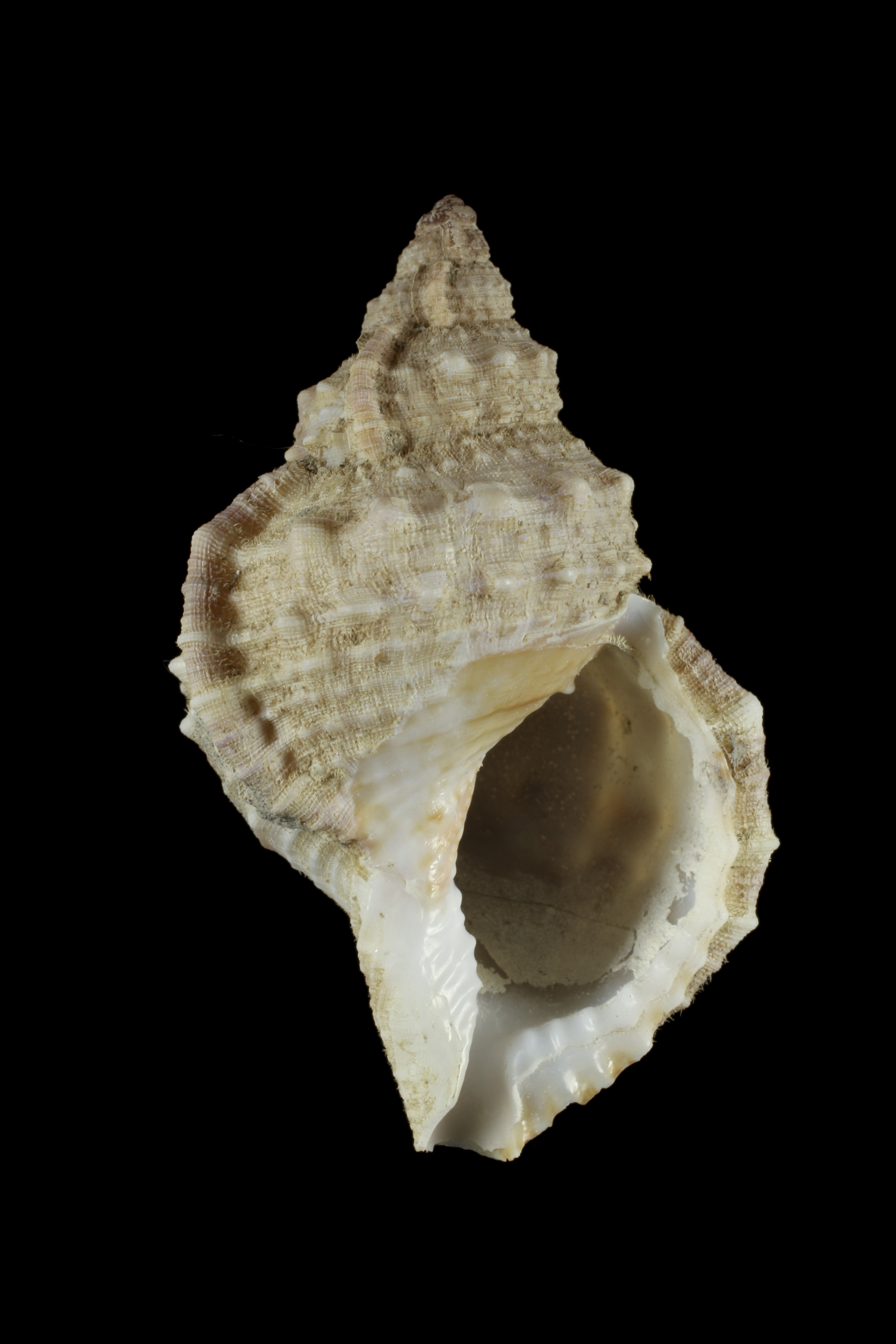
- Shell of Korrigania awatii

Scientific classification
- Kingdom: Animalia
- Phylum: Mollusca
- Class: Gastropoda
- Subclass: Caenogastropoda
- Order: Littorinimorpha
- Superfamily: Tonnoidea
- Family: Bursidae
- Genus: Korrigania
- Species: K. awatii

Binomial name
- Korrigania awatii (Ray, 1949)

Synonyms
- Bursa (Bufonariella) rehderi Beu, 1978; Bursa awatii Ray, 1948 (original combination)

= Korrigania awatii =

Species of gastropod

Korrigania awatii is a species of sea snail, a marine gastropod mollusk in the family Bursidae, the frog shells.

== Description ==
The length of the shell varies between 57 mm and 102 mm.

== Distribution ==
This marine species occurs off Mozambique, Madagascar, the Philippines and in the Bay of Bengal.
