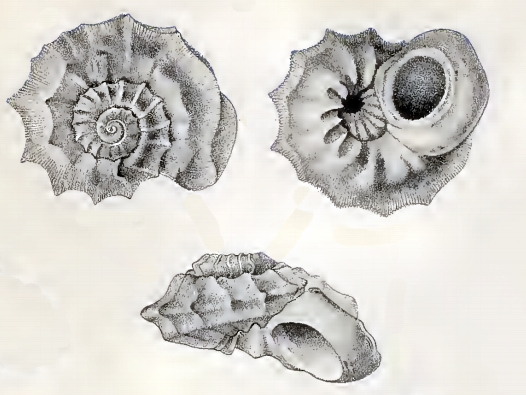
- Original drawing of a shell of Bathyliotina lamellosa

Scientific classification
- Kingdom: Animalia
- Phylum: Mollusca
- Class: Gastropoda
- Subclass: Vetigastropoda
- Order: Trochida
- Family: Liotiidae
- Genus: Bathyliotina
- Species: B. lamellosa

Binomial name
- Bathyliotina lamellosa (Schepman, 1908)

Synonyms
- Liotia (Arene) lamellosa Schepman, 1908

= Bathyliotina lamellosa =

Species of gastropod

Bathyliotina lamellosa, commonly known as the spiny wheel shell, is a species of sea snail, a marine gastropod mollusk in the family Liotiidae.

== Description ==
(Original description by M.M. Schepman) The height of the shell attains 4 mm, its broadest diameter is 7 1/2 mm. The yellowish-white shell has a depressedly turbinate shape. It contains 4 1/2 whorls. The upper ones forma slightly concave spire. The nucleus is rather smooth. It is followed by a whorl, with regular, distinct ribs, slightly angular at some distance from the suture. From there towards the aperture the suture is excavated and the shell bears strong ribs, becoming more distant as they approach the aperture, and become obsolete on the last half whorl. These ribs have blunt spines, bordering the margin of the subsutural excavation, and sharper ones at the periphery. The periphery is keeled in the interstices of the ribs. The body whorl has another keel at some distance from the periphery, with rather obsolete indications of spines, corresponding to those of the upper keel. The space between the keels and above the periphery is somewhat concave. The umbilicus is pervious, its margin strongly crenulated or folded, the folds entering the umbilicus and partly running upwards, towards the lower keel. The aperture is circular. Its inner lip is protracted, the outer lip very broad and thick, broadest at its upper part, slightly excavated and reflected externally. The whole exterior of the shell is covered by low, crowded lamellae.

== Distribution ==
This marine species occurs off the Philippines.
