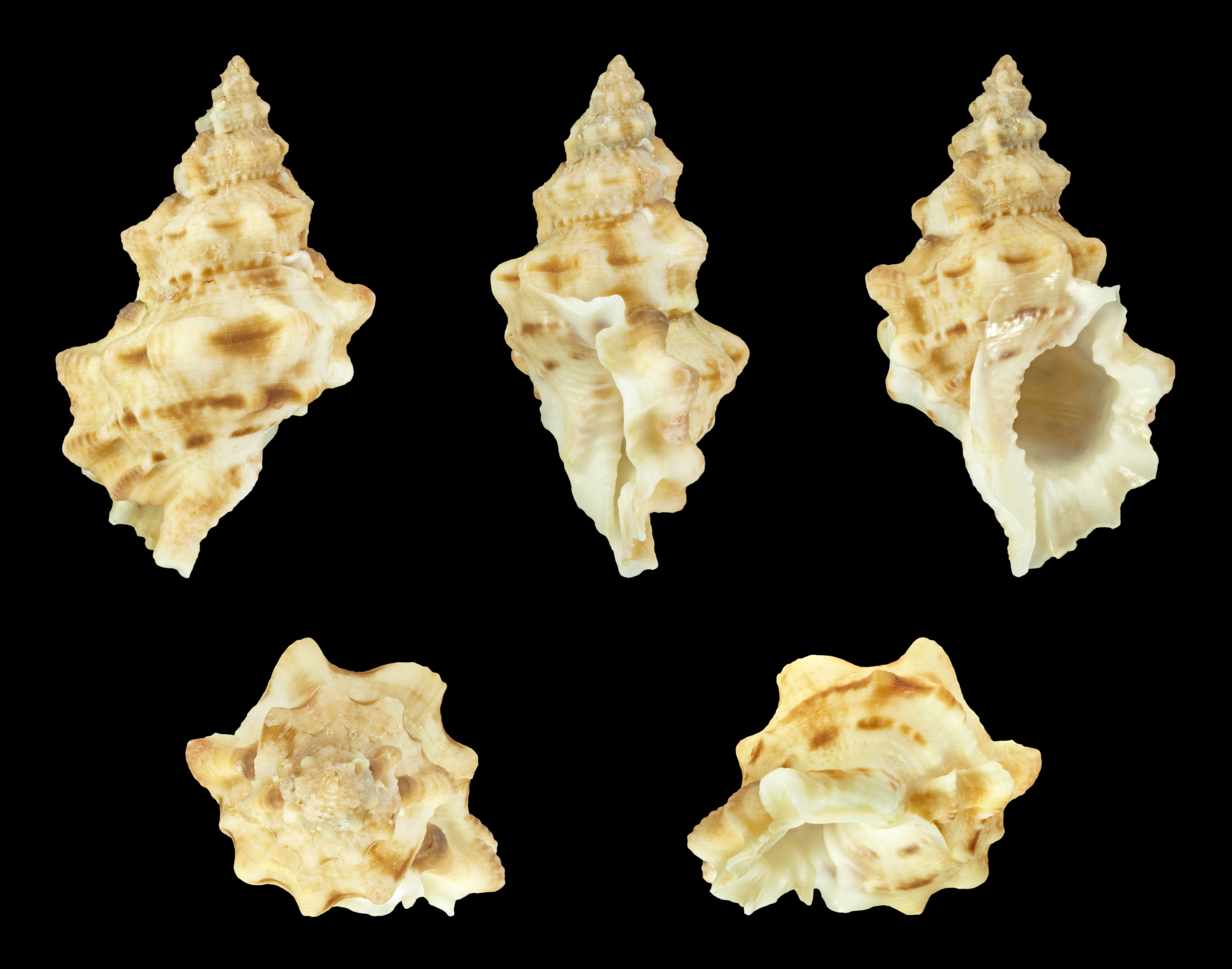

Scientific classification
- Kingdom: Animalia
- Phylum: Mollusca
- Class: Gastropoda
- Subclass: Caenogastropoda
- Order: Littorinimorpha
- Superfamily: Tonnoidea
- Family: Bursidae
- Genus: Korrigania
- Species: K. quirihorai

Binomial name
- Korrigania quirihorai (Beu, 1987)

Synonyms
- Bursa (Colubrellina) quirihorai Beu, 1987; Bursa quirihorai Beu, 1987 ·

= Korrigania quirihorai =

Species of gastropod

Korrigania quirihorai is a species of sea snail, a marine gastropod mollusk in the family Bursidae, the frog shells.

== Description ==
The length of the shell varies between 30 mm and 64 mm.

This species was named after Quirino Hora from Panglao, Bohol, whose family owns the extensive Nova Shell Museum.
