= Korrigania =

- Shell of Korrigania fosteri

Scientific classification
- Kingdom: Animalia
- Phylum: Mollusca
- Class: Gastropoda
- Subclass: Caenogastropoda
- Order: Littorinimorpha
- Superfamily: Tonnoidea
- Family: Bursidae
- Genus: Korrigania; M. T. Sanders, Merle, Laurin, Bonillo & Puillandre, 2020

Type species
- Ranella fijiensis R. B. Watson, 1881

Genus of gastropods

Korrigania is a genus of sea snails, marine gastropod mollusks in the family Bursidae, the frog shells.

== Species ==
- Korrigania awatii (Ray, 1948)
- Korrigania fijiensis (R. B. Watson, 1881)
- Korrigania fosteri (Beu, 1987)
- Korrigania quirihorai (Beu, 1987)
- Korrigania vianelloi T. Cossignani, 2023

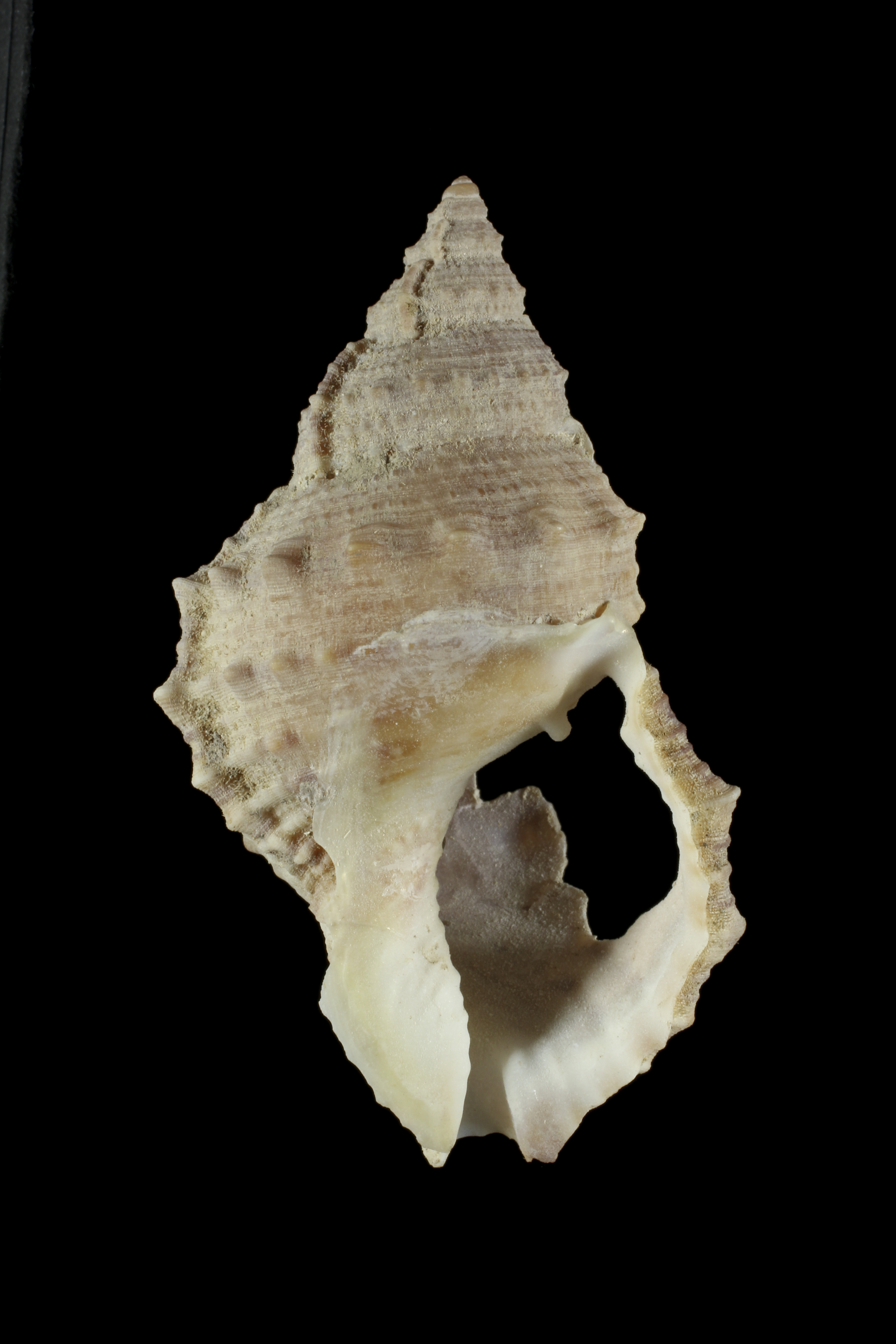
Korrigania awatii

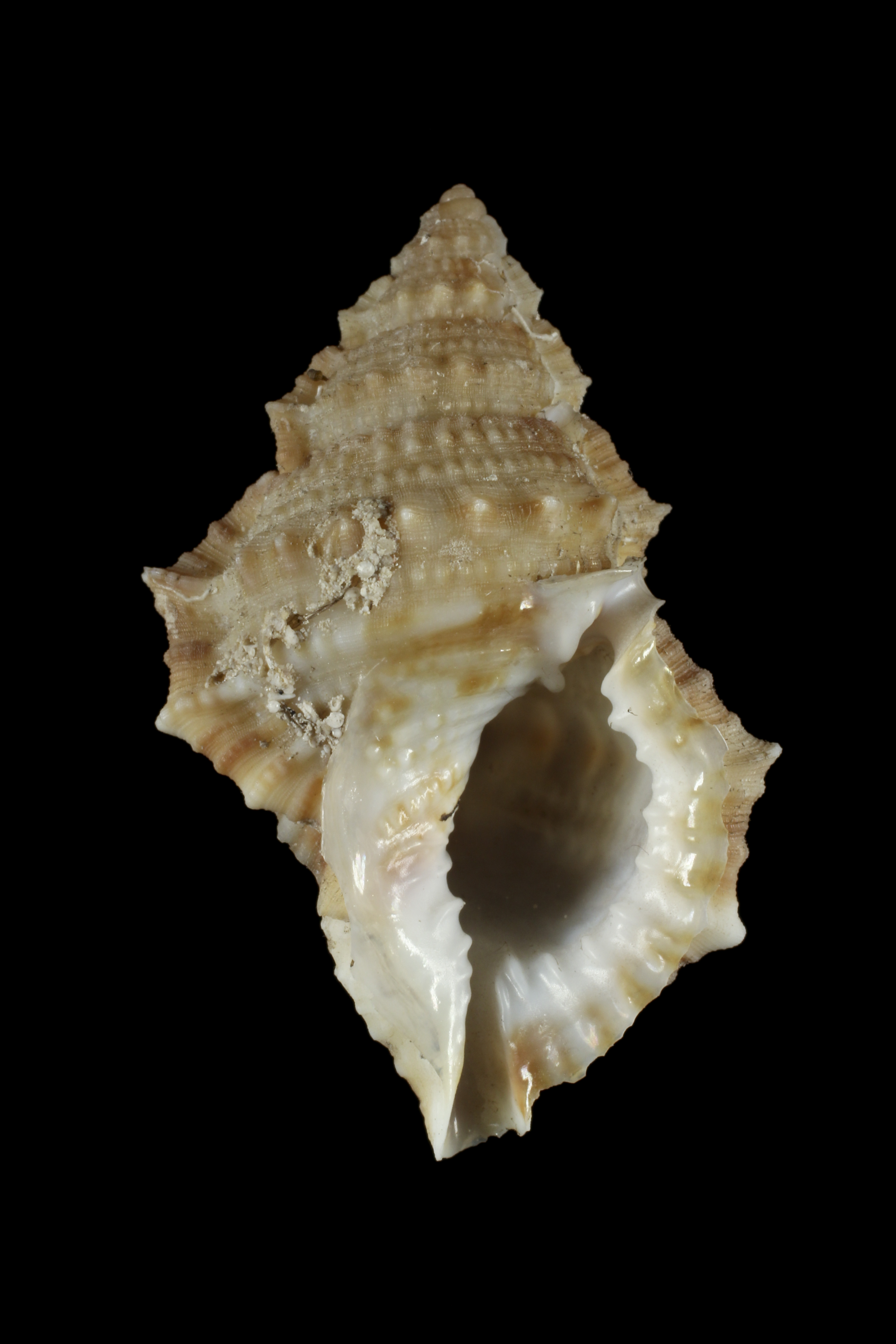
Korrigania fijiensis

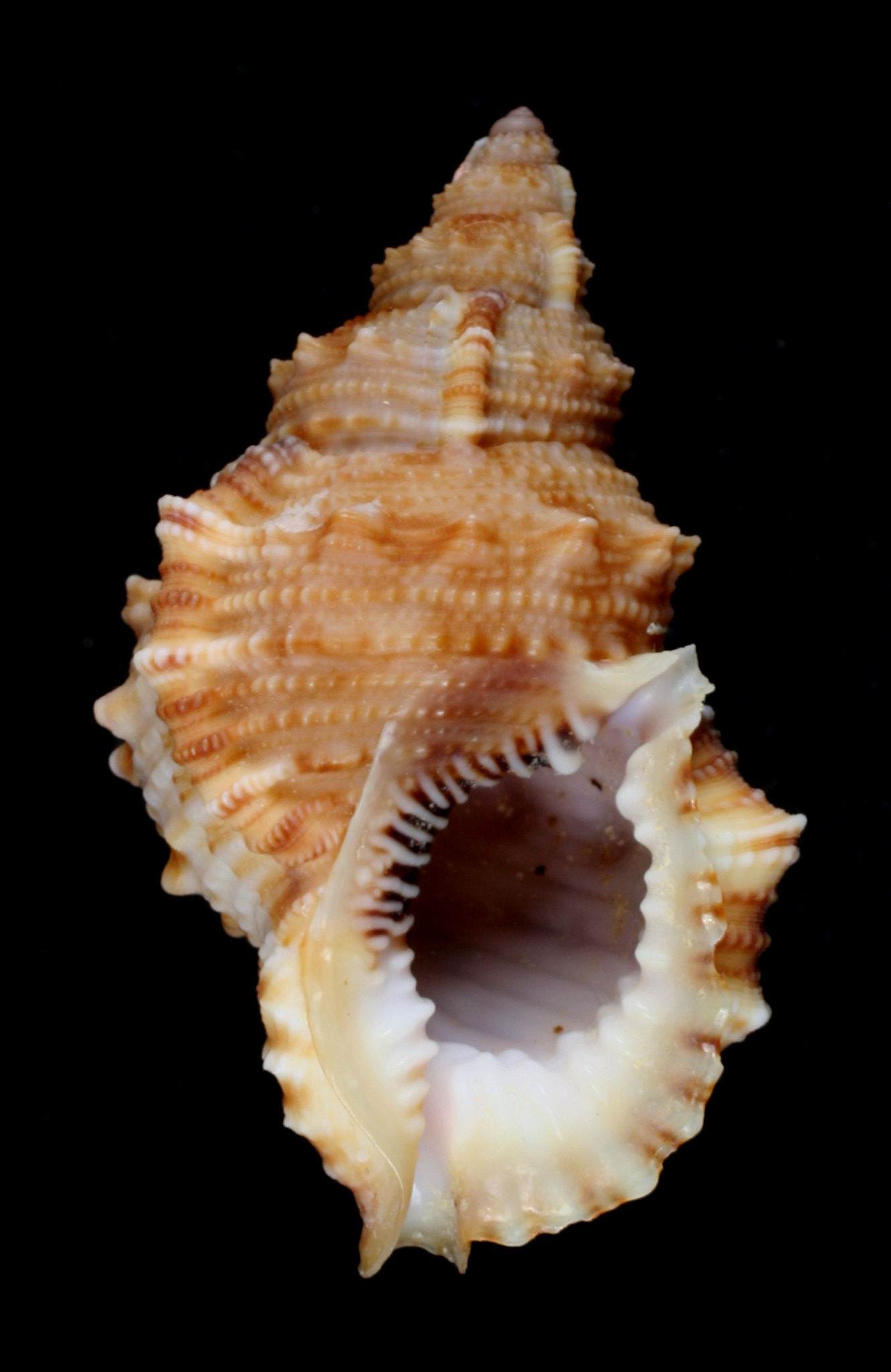
Korrigania fosteri

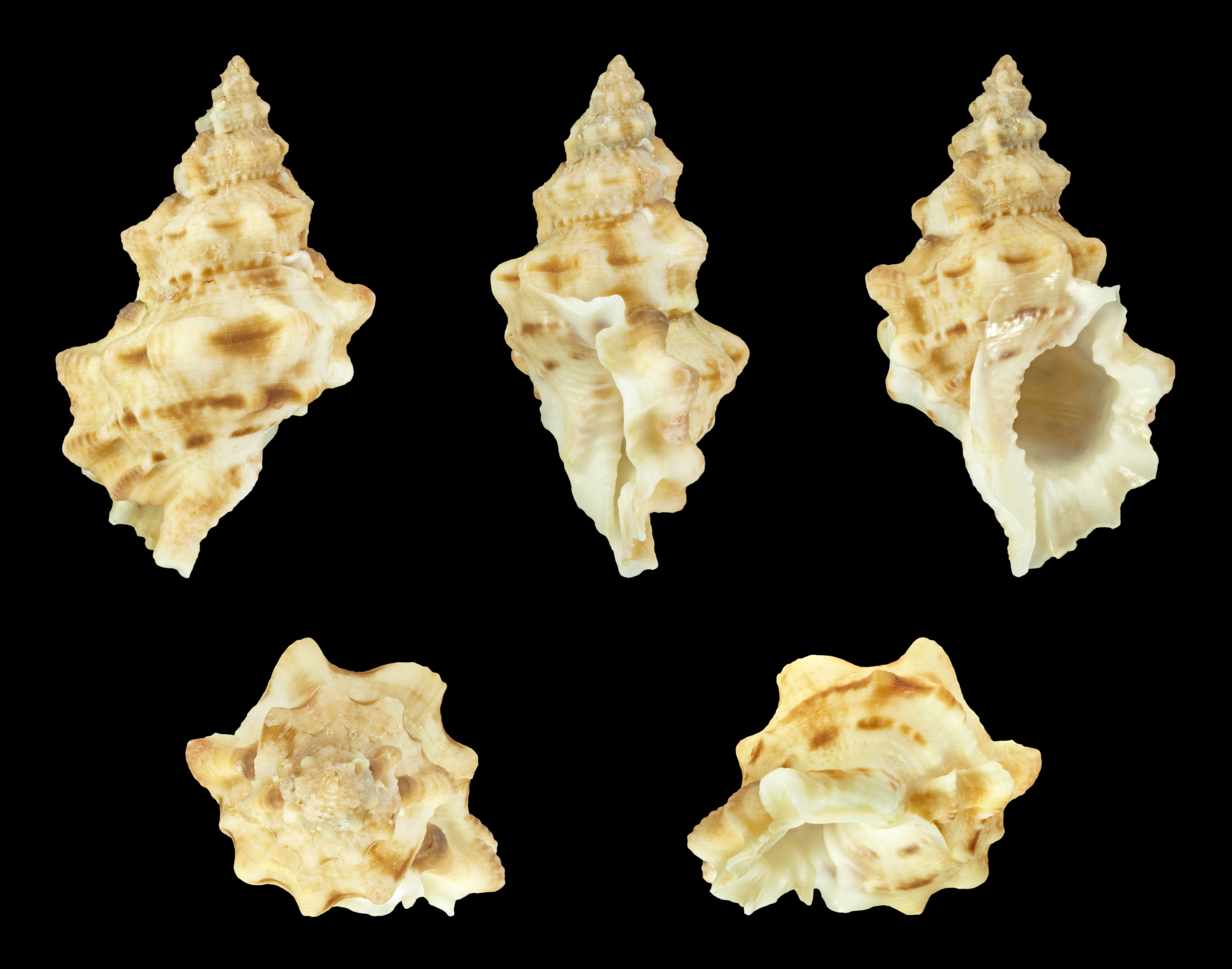
Korrigania quirihorai
