= Korrigania fosteri =

- Apertural view of Korrigania fosteri Beu, 1987

Scientific classification
- Kingdom: Animalia
- Phylum: Mollusca
- Class: Gastropoda
- Subclass: Caenogastropoda
- Order: Littorinimorpha
- Superfamily: Tonnoidea
- Family: Bursidae
- Genus: Korrigania
- Species: K. fosteri

Binomial name
- Korrigania fosteri Beu, 1987

Synonyms
- Bursa (Bufonariella) latitudo fosteri Beu, 1987; Bursa (Colubrellina) latitudo fosteri Beu, 1987; Bursa fosteri Beu, 1987

Species of gastropod

Korrigania fosteri is a species of sea snail, a marine gastropod mollusk in the family Bursidae, the frog shells.

== Description ==
The length of the shell varies between 24 mm and 77.5 mm.

== Distribution ==
This marine species occurs off the Philippines and New Caledonia.
