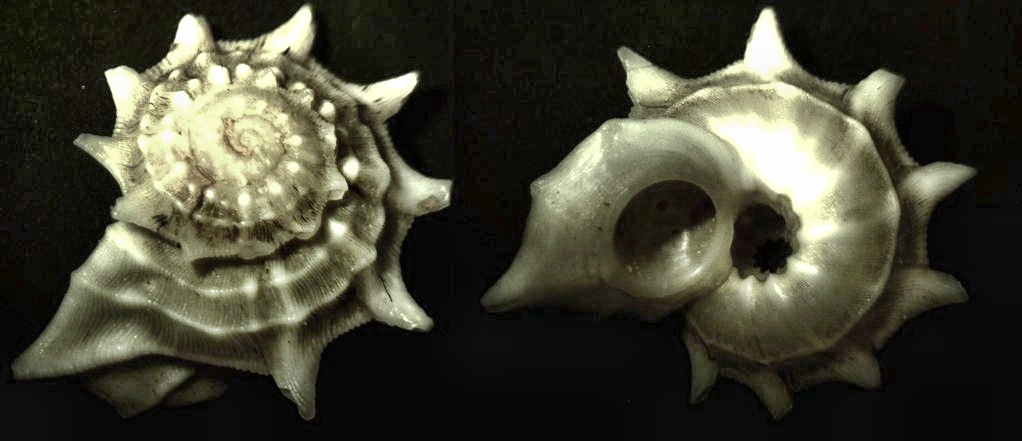
- Two views of a shell of Bathyliotina glassi

Scientific classification
- Kingdom: Animalia
- Phylum: Mollusca
- Class: Gastropoda
- Subclass: Vetigastropoda
- Order: Trochida
- Family: Liotiidae
- Genus: Bathyliotina
- Species: B. glassi

Binomial name
- Bathyliotina glassi J. H. McLean, 1988

= Bathyliotina glassi =

Species of gastropod

Bathyliotina glassi, commonly known as the spiny wheel shell, is a species of sea snail, a marine gastropod mollusk in the family Liotiidae.

== Taxonomy ==
Bathyliotina glassi was described by James Hamilton McLean in 1988 from material collected in the Philippines. In the original description, the species was placed in the genus Bathyliotina Habe, 1961, then treated in the subfamily Liotiinae of the family Turbinidae. It is currently accepted in the family Liotiidae.

The specific name glassi honours Charles Glass of Santa Barbara, California, who supplied material used in the description of the species.

== Description ==
The shell of Bathyliotina glassi is large for the genus and has a depressed turbinate form. It is yellowish white in colour and has four whorls. The listed shell size is about 10–15 mm. The holotype measures 8.5 mm in height and 16.0 mm in maximum diameter.

The shell has a spinose periphery, with about twelve pointed and upturned spines on each whorl. The aperture is oblique and circular, with a nacreous interior, and the mature outer lip is greatly expanded. The shell surface has fine lamellar growth increments, and the spiral sculpture includes nodulose cords between the suture and the periphery. The base has spiral cords near the outer edge and around the umbilicus.

The operculum has numerous whorls and bears sharply projecting beads. McLean distinguished Bathyliotina glassi from other species of the genus by its long peripheral spines. He considered it most similar to Bathyliotina schepmani, but noted that B. schepmani is smaller, more elevated and has shorter peripheral spines.

== Distribution and habitat ==
This marine species is known from the western Pacific Ocean, off the Philippines. The type locality is the Bohol Strait, Philippines, at a depth of 90–180 m.

Additional material examined by McLean came from several Philippine localities, including off Mindoro, Luzon and Leyte, with some specimens recorded from depths of about 192–220 m and 208 m.

== Type material ==
The type series consisted of five specimens. The holotype, catalogued as LACM 2298, was deposited in the Natural History Museum of Los Angeles County. Paratypes were deposited in the same museum, the National Museum of Natural History in Washington, D.C., and the Australian Museum in Sydney.
