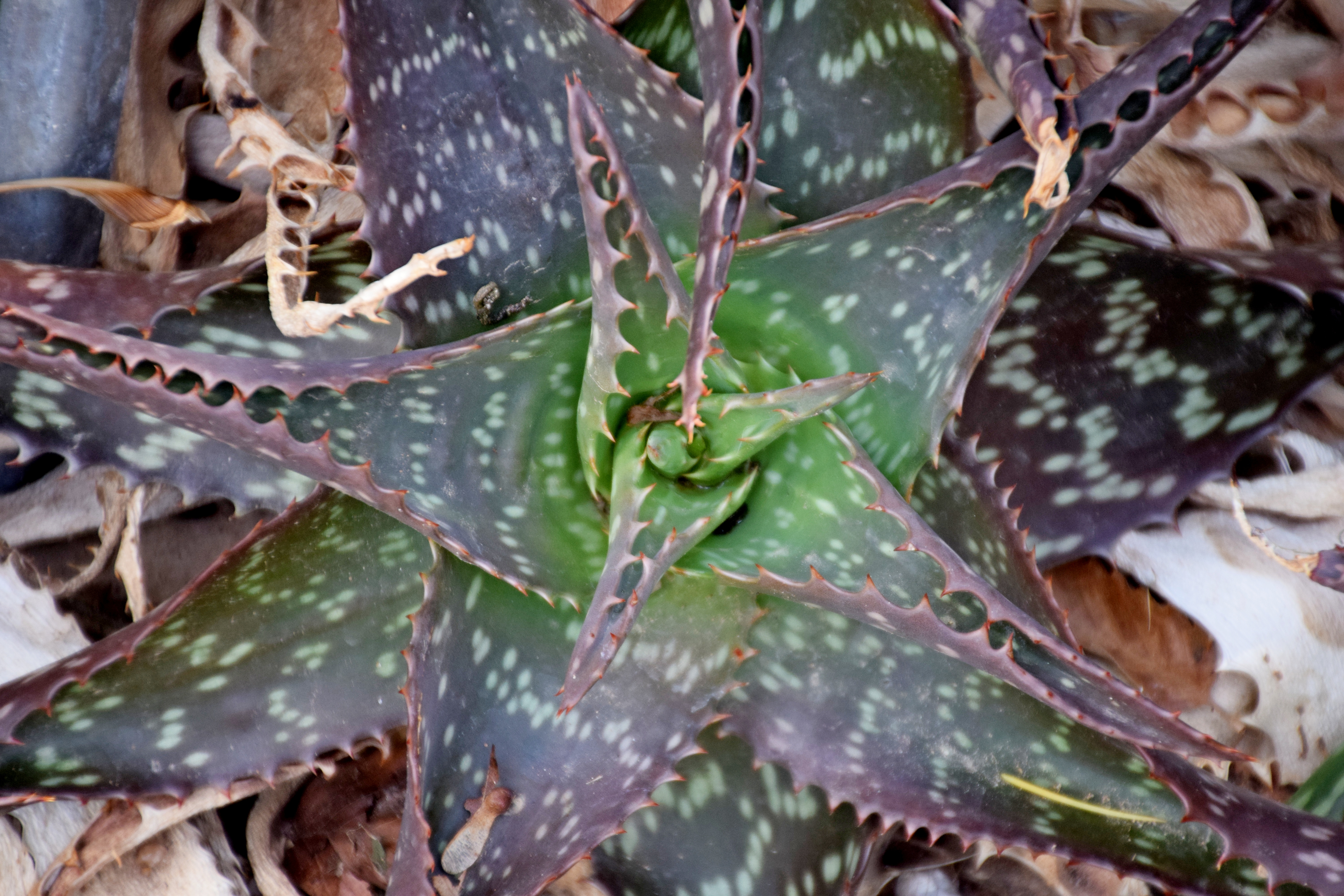

Conservation status
- Least Concern (IUCN 3.1)
- CITES Appendix II (CITES)

Scientific classification
- Kingdom: Plantae
- Clade: Tracheophytes
- Clade: Angiosperms
- Clade: Monocots
- Order: Asparagales
- Family: Asphodelaceae
- Subfamily: Asphodeloideae
- Genus: Aloe
- Species: A. lateritia

Binomial name
- Aloe lateritia Engl.

= Aloe lateritia =

Species of succulent

Aloe lateritia is an aloe widespread in open grassland and rocky bushland of East Africa.

== Description ==
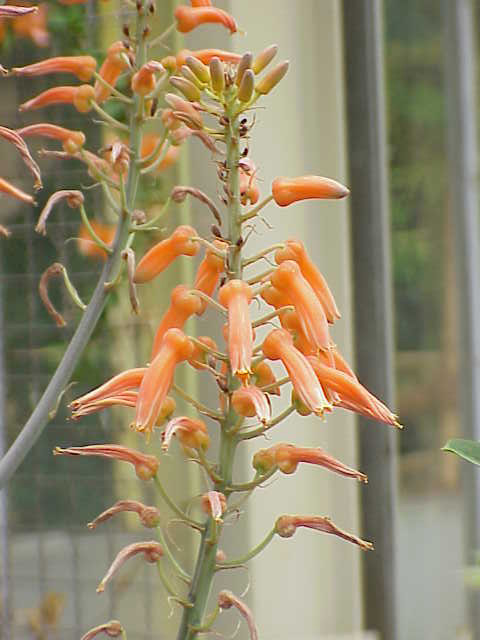
Flowers

Aloe lateritia is an acaulescent, succulent Aloe species. Its glossy leaves are light green, becoming brown-green in the sun. The leaves have thin white margins, and are covered in pale spots and patches. The underside of the leaves have much fewer, paler and more blurred spots. The flowers are orange-red (rarely yellow), glossy, and are born on 20–25 mm pedicels, on capitate or subcapitate racemes, on a branched inflorescence (panicle).

== Distribution ==
Aloe lateritia var. lateritia occurs across the whole of Tanzania. It also extends into southern Kenya, and the far northern tip of Malawi. Aloe lateritia var. graminicola occurs to the north, in the grasslands of western Kenya.
