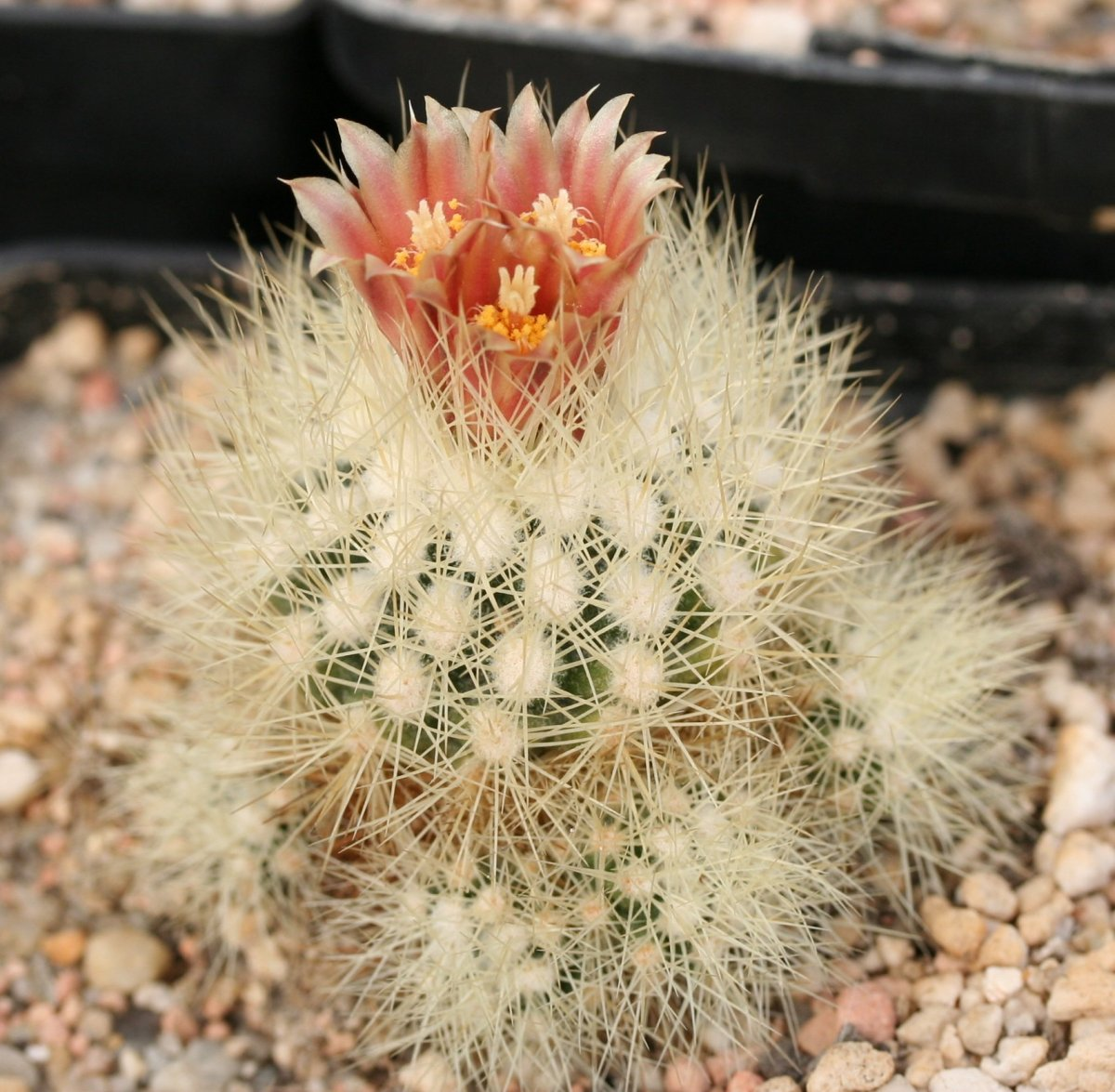

Conservation status
- Vulnerable (IUCN 3.1)
- CITES Appendix II

Scientific classification
- Kingdom: Plantae
- Clade: Embryophytes
- Clade: Tracheophytes
- Clade: Spermatophytes
- Clade: Angiosperms
- Clade: Eudicots
- Order: Caryophyllales
- Family: Cactaceae
- Subfamily: Cactoideae
- Genus: Acharagma
- Species: A. roseanum

Binomial name
- Acharagma roseanum (Boed.) E.F.Anderson

Synonyms
- Coryphantha roseana (Boed.) R.Moran; Echinocactus roseanus Boed.; Escobaria roseana (Boed.) Buxb.; Gymnocactus roseanus (Boed.) Glass & R.A.Foster; Neolloydia roseana (Boed.) F.M.Knuth in Backeb. & F.M.Knuth; Thelocactus roseanus (Boed.) Borg

= Acharagma roseanum =

Species of cactus

Acharagma roseanum is a succulent cactus native to a small area of mountains of southeastern Coahuila and Nuevo León, Mexico. It grows on rocky limestone hills and xerophytic shrubland. Its name is often misspelled as "Roseana".

== Description ==
Acharagma roseanum forms individual, small, soft bodied cacti that form clusters over time. The plant's specific physical characteristics are: The stem is 4–6 cm (1.6–2.4 in) tall, 1.5–5 cm (0.59–1.97 in) wide with spines that are white-yellow to gold color. The warts stand in rows and are up to 0.3 centimeters long. The 4 to 6 yellow central spines are very similar to the marginal spines or are slightly curved and are 1 to 2 centimeters long. The 15 to 30 marginal spines are yellowish to brownish and 0.8 to 1.5 centimeters long. The flowers are pink to bronze with a dark reddish central stripe or cream flowers on the top of the stem, 1.5–2 cm (0.59–0.79 in) in diameter.

== Distribution ==
Acharagma roseanum is widespread in the Mexican states of Coahuila, Nuevo León and San Luis Potosí.

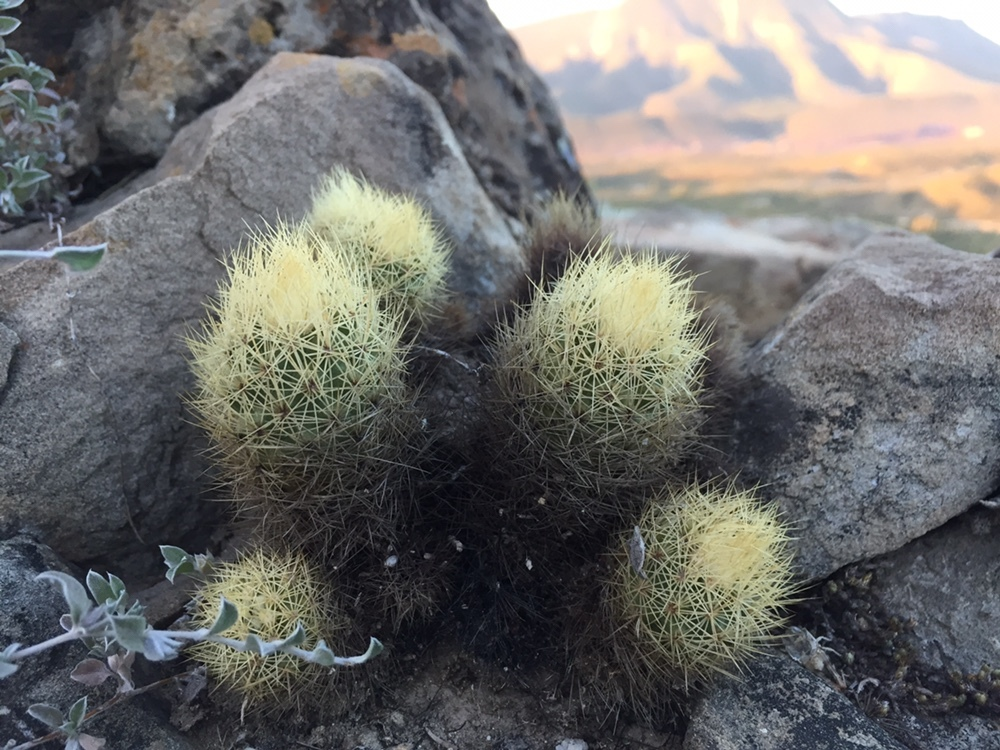
Habitat in Sin Nombre de Col 6, Saltillo, Coahuila, Mexico

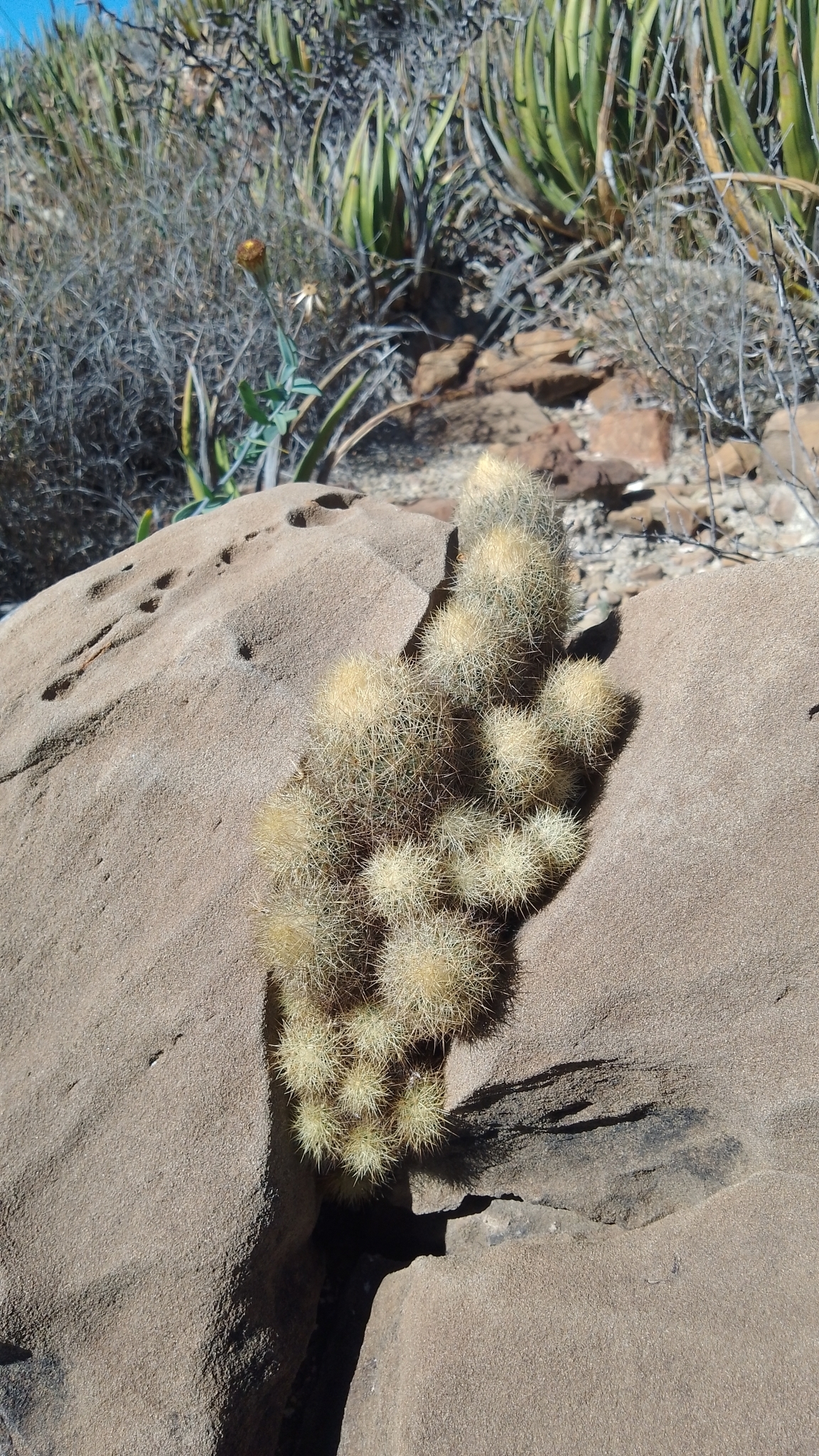
Habitat in Saltillo, Coahuila, Mexico

== Taxonomy ==
The first description was made in 1928 as Echinocactus roseanus by Friedrich Bödeker. The specific epithet roseanum honors the American botanist Joseph Nelson Rose. Edward Frederick Anderson placed the species in the genus Acharagma in 1999.

Synonyms are the following described species: Echinocactus roseanus Boed. (1928), Neoloydia roseanus (Boed.) F.M.Knuth (1936), Thelocactus roseanus (Boed.) W.T.Marshall (1941), Escobaria roseana (Boed.) Buxb. (1951), Coryphantha roseana (Boed.) Moran (1953) and Gymnocactus roseanus (Boed.) Glas & R.A.Foster (1970).
