= Bob Foster (horticulturist) =

American horticulturist and businessman (1938–2002)

Robert Alan Foster (1938–2002) was an American horticulturist and businessman.

Foster, a native of Los Angeles County, California, developed a love for horticulture early in life. Growing up on his family's avocado farm, he constructed his first lath house and began cultivating bonsai by age 12. After working in the family insurance business, Foster partnered with his best friend, the horticulturist Charlie Glass, in 1968 to manage Abbey Garden Press and Nursery. The duo also collaborated as editors of the Cactus and Succulent Journal and co-authored the book Cacti and Succulents for the Amateur (1974).

Glass and Foster's shared passion for succulents led them on extensive expeditions. Between 1964 and 1974 they made 15 such trips to Mexico. In 1968, they identified a new cactus species, later named Mammillaria glassii in honor of Glass. Their fieldwork ultimately contributed to the discovery or description of 28 cacti and the reclassification of 26 others.

The pair briefly sold Abbey Garden to work for Ganna Walska as directors of Lotusland, a botanical garden in Montecito, before buying the business back. Some time after relocating the business to Santa Barbara as a wholesale operation, they expanded into rare shells, establishing the largest specimen shell dealership in the United States. Foster sold his collections in the early 1990s and moved the shell business to Bishop, California. He died in Mammoth Lakes in January 2002. His legacy is honored through three mollusc species: Murex fosteri, Murex fosterorum, and Bursa fosteri.
