= Charlie Glass =

American horticulturalist (1934–1998)

Glass admiring Mammillaria glassii, named in his honor by his friend and business partner, Bob Foster

Charles Edward Glass (24 May 1934 – 23 February 1998) was an American horticulturalist and plant collector. Together with his best friend, Bob Foster, Glass collected and scientifically described dozens of cacti species, edited the Cactus and Succulent Journal, led the Lotusland botanical garden, and ran a garden and shell business. He also wrote books and curated a botanical reserve in Mexico, helping discover more plant species.

== Early life ==
Glass was born in New York City and his family enjoyed the arts. His childhood home was in Spring Lake, New Jersey. His mother, Lillian, sang opera, and his father, Beaumont, played the violin for the Philadelphia Orchestra and he was the "founding conductor" of the Monmouth Symphony Orchestra. After attending private school in New Hampshire, Glass briefly studied at the Sorbonne in Paris and Yale University before enlisting in the US Army in 1953, serving as a radio operator in Germany. Following his service, he studied drama in New York and participated in master classes with opera diva Lotte Lehmann, where he met Ganna Walska, founder of Lotusland.

== Career ==
In 1960, Glass moved to Los Angeles and developed a passion for cacti, purchasing a nursery he named "That Cactus Shop". He became editor of the Cactus and Succulent Journal in 1964, a position that shaped his career. Partnering with Robert Foster in 1968, the two undertook 18 expeditions to Mexico, discovering or reclassifying dozens of cacti species. They co-owned Abbey Garden Press, co-authored works on succulents, and collaborated on various botanical endeavors. In 1973, Glass and Foster became co-directors of Lotusland, where they redesigned the gardens to include significant collections of cacti, succulents, aloes, bromeliads, and cycads.

Beyond his botanical pursuits, Glass was a passionate scuba diver and shell collector, editing The Conchologist and collecting shells worldwide. Proficient in multiple languages, he translated and performed over 300 Filipino folk songs on television and stage in the Philippines and the U.S. In 1991, he became curator of El Charco del Ingenio, a botanical reserve in San Miguel de Allende, Mexico, where he organized plant exploration expeditions and helped discover 42 new plant species. After leaving in 1997 due to permit restrictions, he began a new non-profit plant research initiative based in his San Miguel, Rancho Alcocer home, in collaboration with Mario Mendoza García.

Glass authored several books, including Cacti and Succulents for the Amateur (with Foster) and Cacti (with Clive Innes). He served as vice president of the California Cactus Growers and the African Succulent Plant Society. He was also an honorary life member of the Sociedad Mexicana de Cactología and participated in the International Organization for Succulent Plant Study. Glass is commemorated in the species Mammillaria glassii and the shell Bathyliotina glassi. He died of a heart attack in 1998, shortly after launching a new research initiative.
