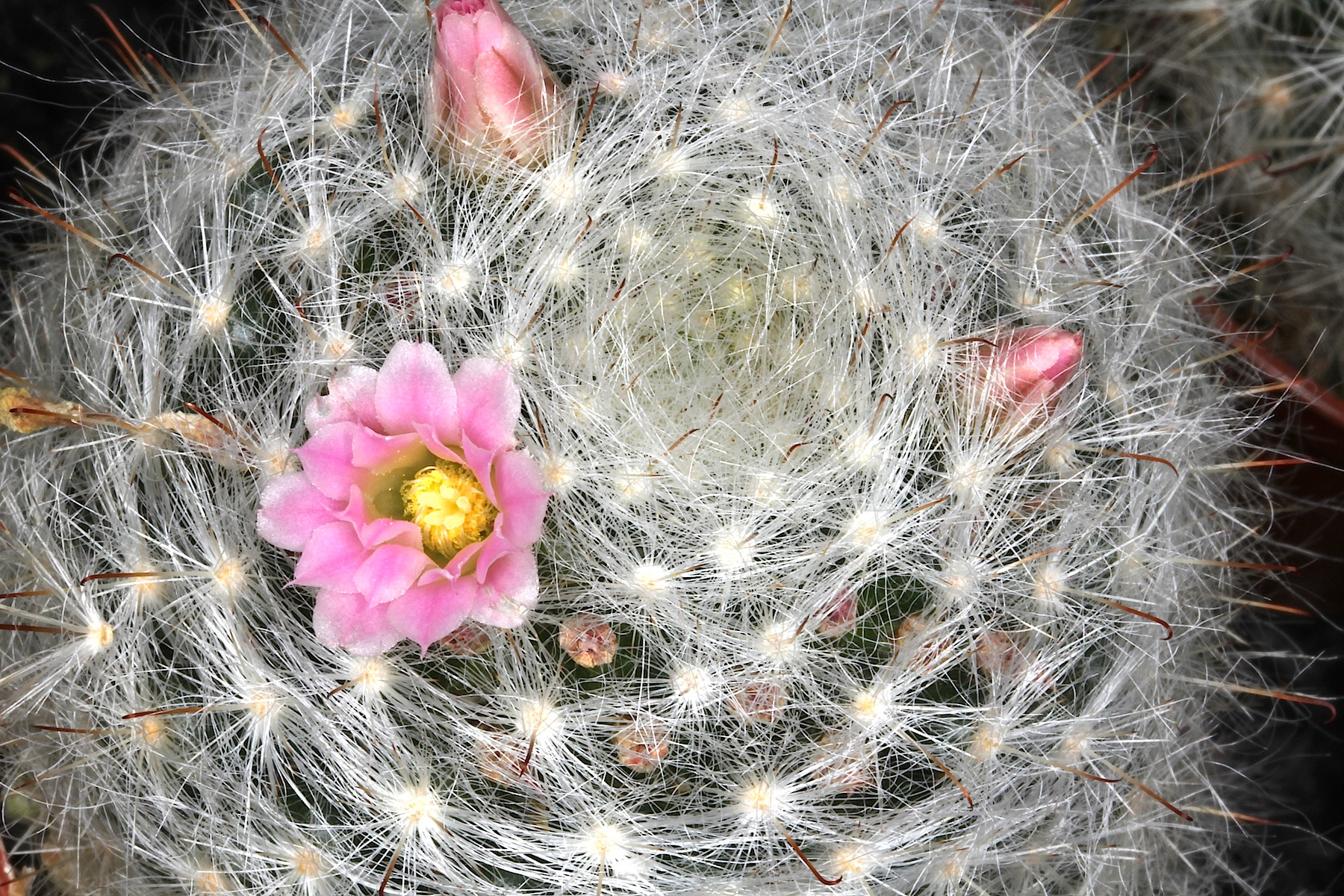
- M. glassii subsp. glassii

Conservation status
- Least Concern (IUCN 3.1)

Scientific classification
- Kingdom: Plantae
- Clade: Tracheophytes
- Clade: Angiosperms
- Clade: Eudicots
- Order: Caryophyllales
- Family: Cactaceae
- Subfamily: Cactoideae
- Genus: Mammillaria
- Species: M. glassii

Binomial name
- Mammillaria glassii R.A. Foster, 1968

= Mammillaria glassii =

Species of cactus

Mammillaria glassii is a species of cactus native to Mexico. It comprises two subspecies: M. glassii subsp. glassii and M. glassii subsp. ascensionis. In its natural habitat, high in the mountains, it often grows on rocky slopes in the shade. It is grown as an ornamental plant, appreciated for its dense spines and pink flowers, which are especially large in the subsp. ascensionis.

== Taxonomy ==
Mammillaria glassii was described in 1968 by Bob Foster and named after Charlie Glass. The botanist David Hunt recognizes two subspecies: M. glassii subsp. glassii and M. glassii subsp. ascensionis. He declared the varieties var. nominis-dulcis and var. siberiensis, described by Alfred Lau, to be synonymous with M. glassii subsp. ascensionis. M. glassii subsp. ascensionis had been described as a separate species by Werner Reppenhagen in 1997, but quickly reduced to a variety by Foster and Glass.

A 2004 study shows that Mammillaria glassii forms a clade with M. carmenae, M. pectinifera, M. picta, M. plumosa, and M. prolifera.

== Description ==
Mammillaria glassii is a succulent subshrub. It has rounded stems growing in clusters. The body is entirely concealed by a dense covering of spines and bristly white axillary hairs. Its root system is sparse. Fruits are edible; they start green and turn pinkish as they mature, containing black seeds.

The stems of Mammillaria glassii subsp. glassii measure 3 cm in height and width, and eventually grow into cylindrical forms up to 10 cm tall. There are 20 to 30 axillary hairs per areole, reaching up to 25 mm long. It has 50 to 60 fine, white, interwoven radial spines, each 10 to 15 mm long. A single golden-amber central spine, which may be straight or hooked, is accompanied by 6 to 8 pale amber sub-central spines that are hard to distinguish from the radials. The pale pink flowers, measuring up to 14 mm long and 3.5 mm wide, only fully open under bright sunlight.

Mammillaria glassii subsp. ascensionis is distinguished from M. glassii subsp. glassii by its larger stems, measuring 2 to 10 cm in diameter, fewer axillary hairs, a more rounded top, slightly woolly areoles, and longer central spines. Most notably, it features much larger flowers, measuring 18 to 22 mm wide and ranging in color from pale shell-pink (seen in the former var. ascensionis and var. siberiensis) to deep pink (in the former var. nominis-dulcis).

== Range and habitat ==
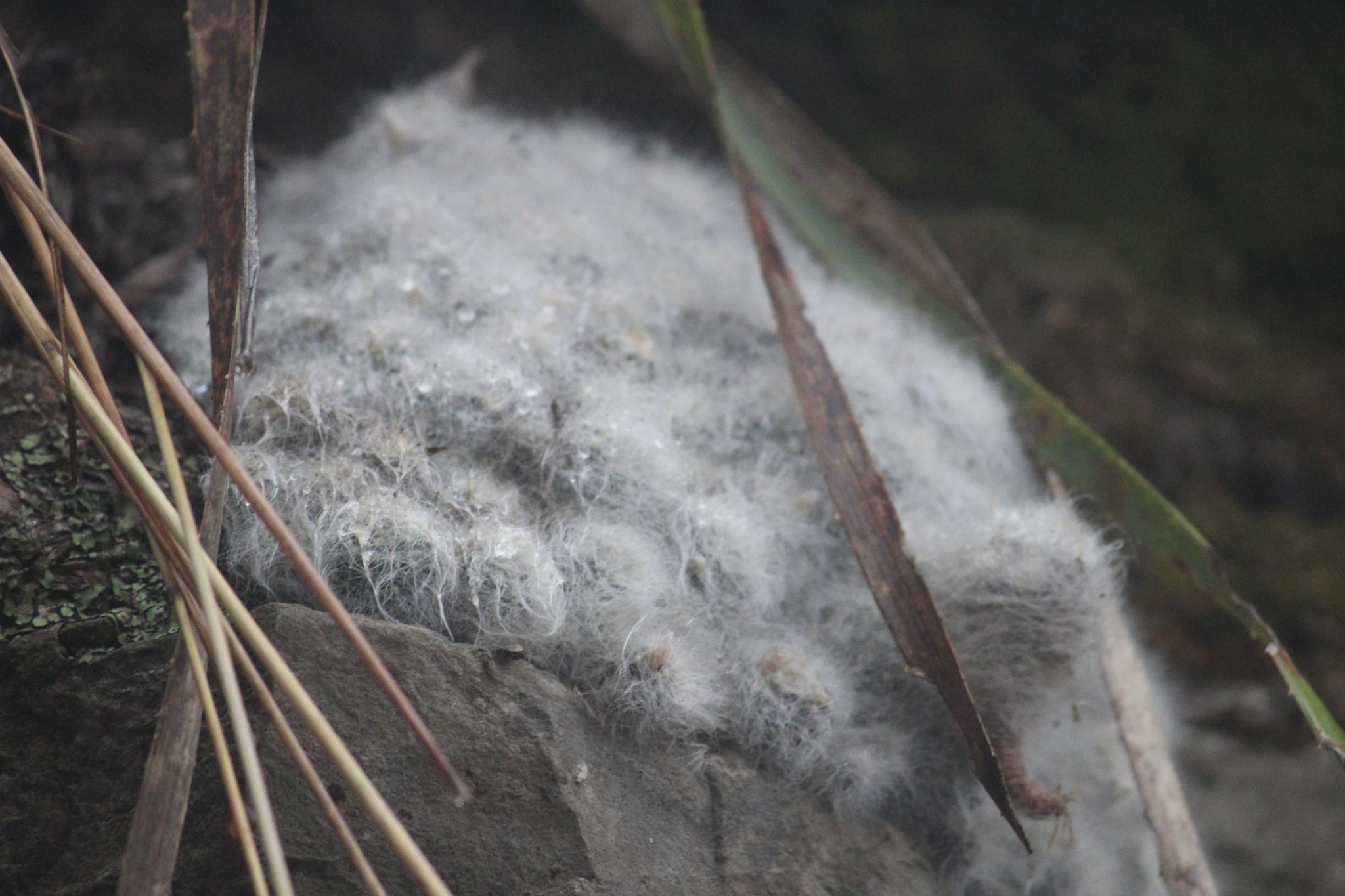
In its natural habitat, M. glassii subsp. glassii often grows in the shade.

Mammillaria glassii is endemic to Mexico, where it usually grows on steeply sloped rocks and often in shade, even full shade. M. glassii subsp. glassii has been recorded in the Mexican states of Coahuila, Nuevo León, and Tamaulipas at elevations of 1,450 to 2,250 meters. M. glassii subsp. ascensionis is found at 2,400 to 2,750m altitude in Nuevo León, growing in moss and limestone as well as in crevices on steep cliffs, where it receives sunlight only in the late afternoon. The former var. siberiensis, now included in this subspecies, gets its name from a village near which it was discovered.

== Cultivation ==
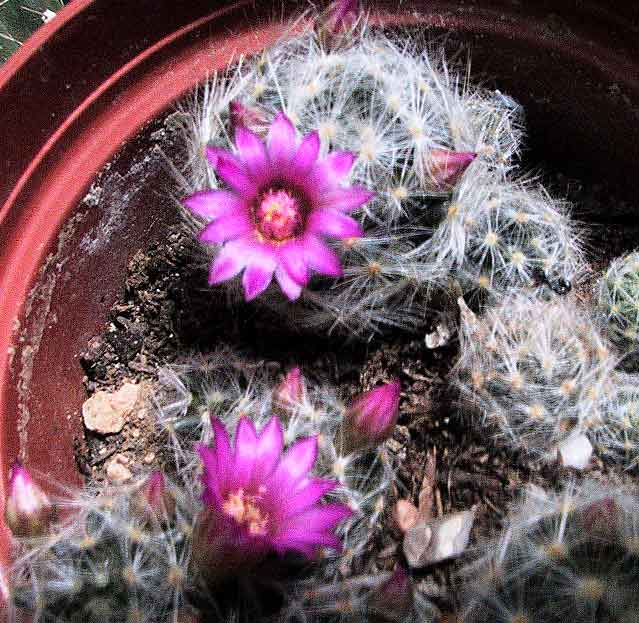
M. glassii is appreciated for its dense spination and colorful flowers.

The discovery of the species caused a sensation among cactus fanciers. The first to enter cultivation was M. glassii subsp. glassii, appreciated for its dense white spination and attractive flowers, but it was soon eclipsed by M. glassii subsp. ascensionis, which has larger, showier flowers. All variants of the species are easy to grow, but require sharp drainage. They are best grown in shallow pots in ample sunlight.
