= Cactus and Succulent Society of America =

Organization about plants

Cactus and Succulent Society of America, Inc.
- Formation: 1929
- Type: Horticultural society
- Headquarters: Pasadena, California
- Location: United States
- Members: 2,000
- Official language: English
- Staff: 1
- Website: cactusandsucculentsociety.org

The Cactus and Succulent Society of America (CSSA) is a horticultural society which is based in Pasadena, California.

== History ==
The CSSA was founded in 1929 in Los Angeles County, at Pasadena, California, and has grown to encompass over 80 affiliated clubs and thousands of members worldwide. The primary purpose of the society is to enjoy succulent (water-storing) plants through horticulture, travel and scientific discovery, with a particular concern for habitat preservation and conservation issues in deserts worldwide.

It is a non-profit, 501(c)(3), tax-exempt organization.

== Objectives ==
The Society supports the cactus and succulent community, both amateur and professional, through education, conservation, scientific research, and research grants.

== Activities ==
The Society undertakes a range of activities to achieve its objectives:

- Publishes The Cactus and Succulent Society Journal, quarterly and the society's more technical yearbook, Haseltonia.
- Organizes an Annual Show & Sale in Pasadena, California
- Organizes a biennial International Convention held in a different location every 2 years
- Facilitates members-only Field Trips to native habitats of cacti and other succulents
- Organizes sale of cactus and succulent seeds to members from the CSSA Seed Depot
- Promotes the conservation of cacti and other succulent species in the wild around the world
