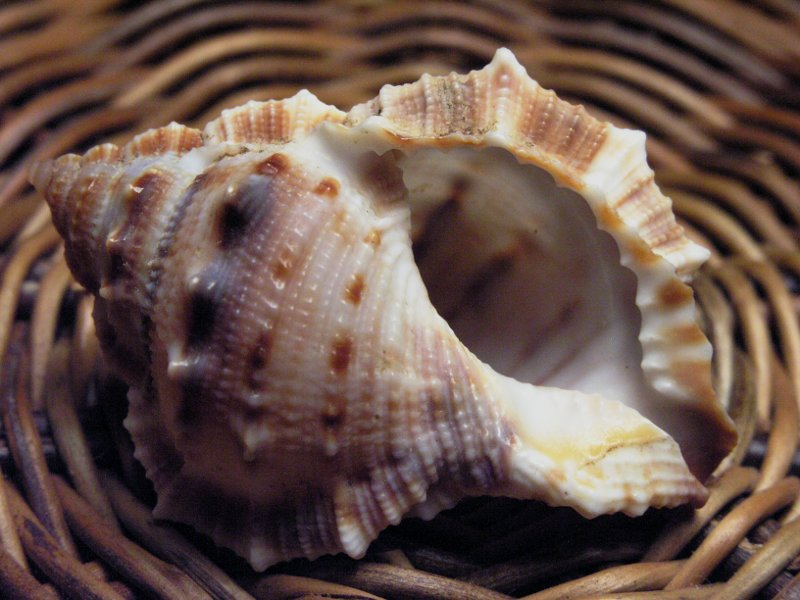
- Shell of Bufonaria rana

Scientific classification
- Kingdom: Animalia
- Phylum: Mollusca
- Class: Gastropoda
- Subclass: Caenogastropoda
- Order: Littorinimorpha
- Superfamily: Tonnoidea
- Family: Bursidae
- Genus: Bufonaria; Schumacher, 1817

Type species
- Bufonaria spinosa Schumacher, 1817

Genera
- See text

Synonyms
- Bufonaria (Chasmotheca) Dall, 1904; Chasmotheca Dall, 1904

= Bufonaria =

Genus of gastropods

Bufonaria is a genus of medium-large sea snails, marine gastropod molluscs in the family Bursidae, the "frog snails".

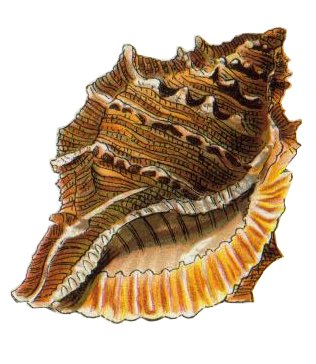
Drawing of the shell of Bufonaria crumena.

== Species ==
Species within the genus Bufonaria include:

- Bufonaria cavitensis (Reeve, 1844)
- Bufonaria cristinae Parth, 1989
- Bufonaria crumena (Lamarck, 1816)
- Bufonaria echinata (Link, 1807)
- Bufonaria elegans (G.B. Sowerby II, 1836)
- Bufonaria foliata (Broderip, 1826)
- Bufonaria granosa (Martin, 1884)
- Bufonaria margaritula (Deshayes, 1832)
- Bufonaria perelegans Beu, 1987
- Bufonaria rana (Linnaeus, 1758)
- Bufonaria thersites (Redfield, 1846)

Species brought into synonymy

- Bufonaria albivaricosa (Reeve, 1844): synonym of Bufonaria rana (Linnaeus, 1758)
- Bufonaria borisbeckeri Parth, 1966: synonym of Bursina borisbeckeri (Parth, 1996)
- Bufonaria bufo (Bruguière, 1792): synonym of Marsupina bufo (Bruguière, 1792)
- Bufonaria (Aspa) crumenoides Valenciennes, A., 1832: synonym of Bufonaria (Aspa) crumena crumena (Lamarck, J.B.P.A. de, 1816)
- Bufonaria fernandesi Beu, 1977: synonym of Bursina fernandezi (Beu, 1977)
- Bufonaria gnorima (Melvill, 1918): synonym of Bursina gnorima (Melvilll, 1918)
- Bufonaria ignobilis Beu, 1987: synonym of Bursina ignobilis (Beu, 1987)
- Bufonaria lamarckii (Deshayes, 1853): synonym of Bursa lamarckii (Deshayes, 1853)
- Bufonaria marginata (Gmelin, 1791): synonym of Aspa marginata (Gmelin, 1791)
- Bufonaria nobilis (Reeve, L.A., 1844): synonym of Bursina nobilis (Reeve, 1844)
- Bufonaria pesleonis Schumacher, 1817: synonym of Bursa scrobilator (Linnaeus, 1758)
- Bufonaria spinosa Schumacher, 1817: synonym of Bufonaria echinata (Link, 1807)
- Bufonaria subgranosa: synonym of Bufonaria rana (Linnaeus, 1758)
