= B. foliata =

B. foliata may refer to:

- Barbatia foliata, an ark clam species in the genus Barbatia found in the Houtman Abrolhos islands, Western Australia
- Bufonaria foliata, a sea snail species

== See also ==
- Foliata (disambiguation)
