= Bursina fijiensis =

Scientific classification
- Kingdom: Animalia
- Phylum: Mollusca
- Class: Gastropoda
- Subclass: Caenogastropoda
- Order: Littorinimorpha
- Family: Bursidae
- Genus: Bursina
- Species: B. fijiensis

Binomial name
- Bursina fijiensis (Watson, 1881)

Synonyms
- Bursa fijiensis (Watson, 1881); Bursa (Colubrellina) fijiensis (Watson, 1881); Ranella fijiensis Watson, 1881

Species of gastropod

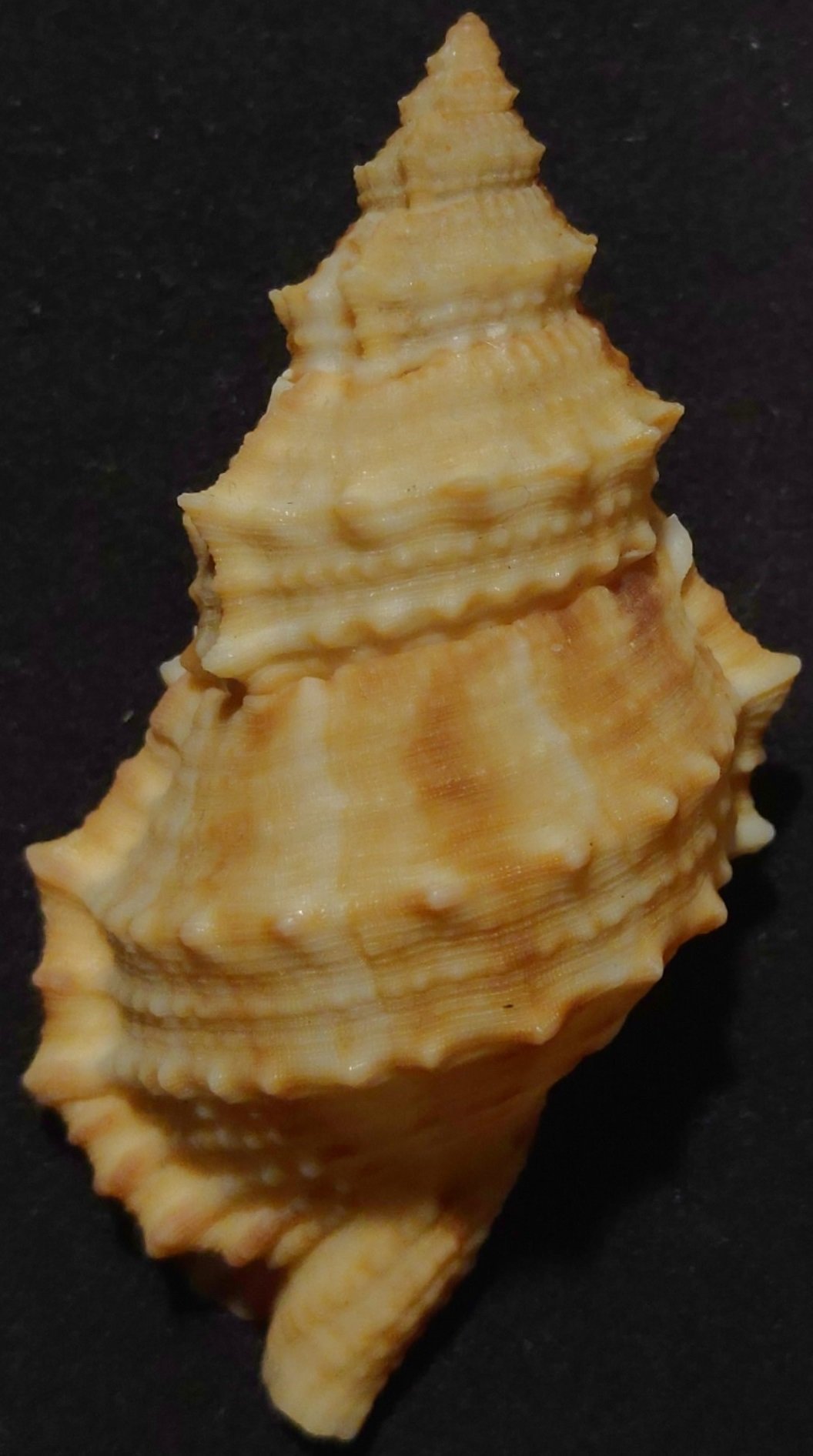

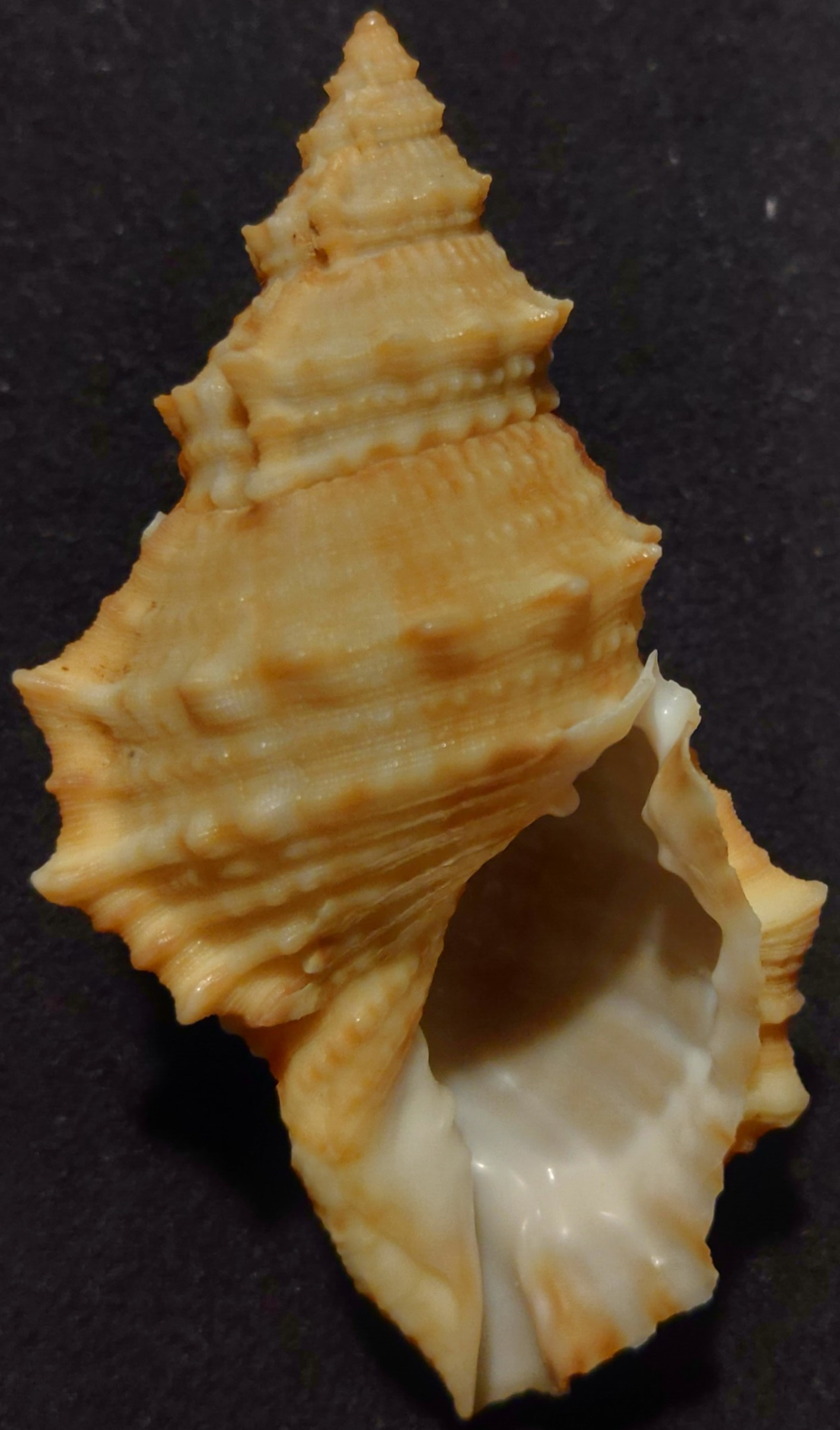

Bursina fijiensis is a species of sea snail, a marine gastropod mollusk in the family Bursidae, the frog shells.

== Description ==
The length of the shell varies between 40 mm and 65 mm. It reproduces through broadcast spawning with embryos developing into planktonic trocophore larvae, then juvenile veligers, then fully grown adults.

== Distribution ==
This marine species occurs off Fiji, Eastern Australia and the Philippines at 280-300m.
