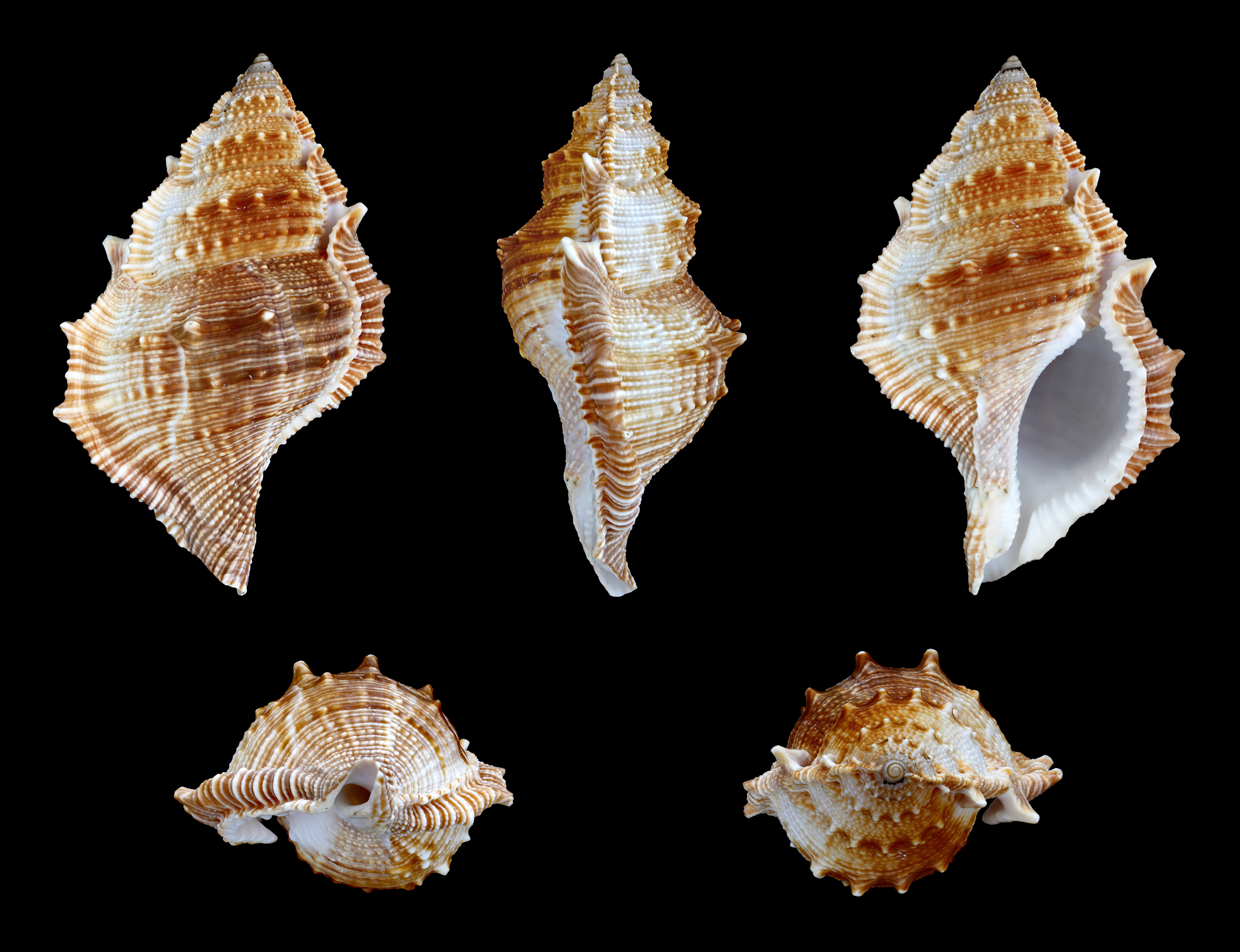

Scientific classification
- Kingdom: Animalia
- Phylum: Mollusca
- Class: Gastropoda
- Subclass: Caenogastropoda
- Order: Littorinimorpha
- Family: Bursidae
- Genus: Bufonaria
- Species: B. cristinae

Binomial name
- Bufonaria cristinae Parth, 1989

= Bufonaria cristinae =

Species of gastropod

Bufonaria cristinae is a species of sea snail, a marine gastropod mollusk in the family Bursidae, the frog shells.
