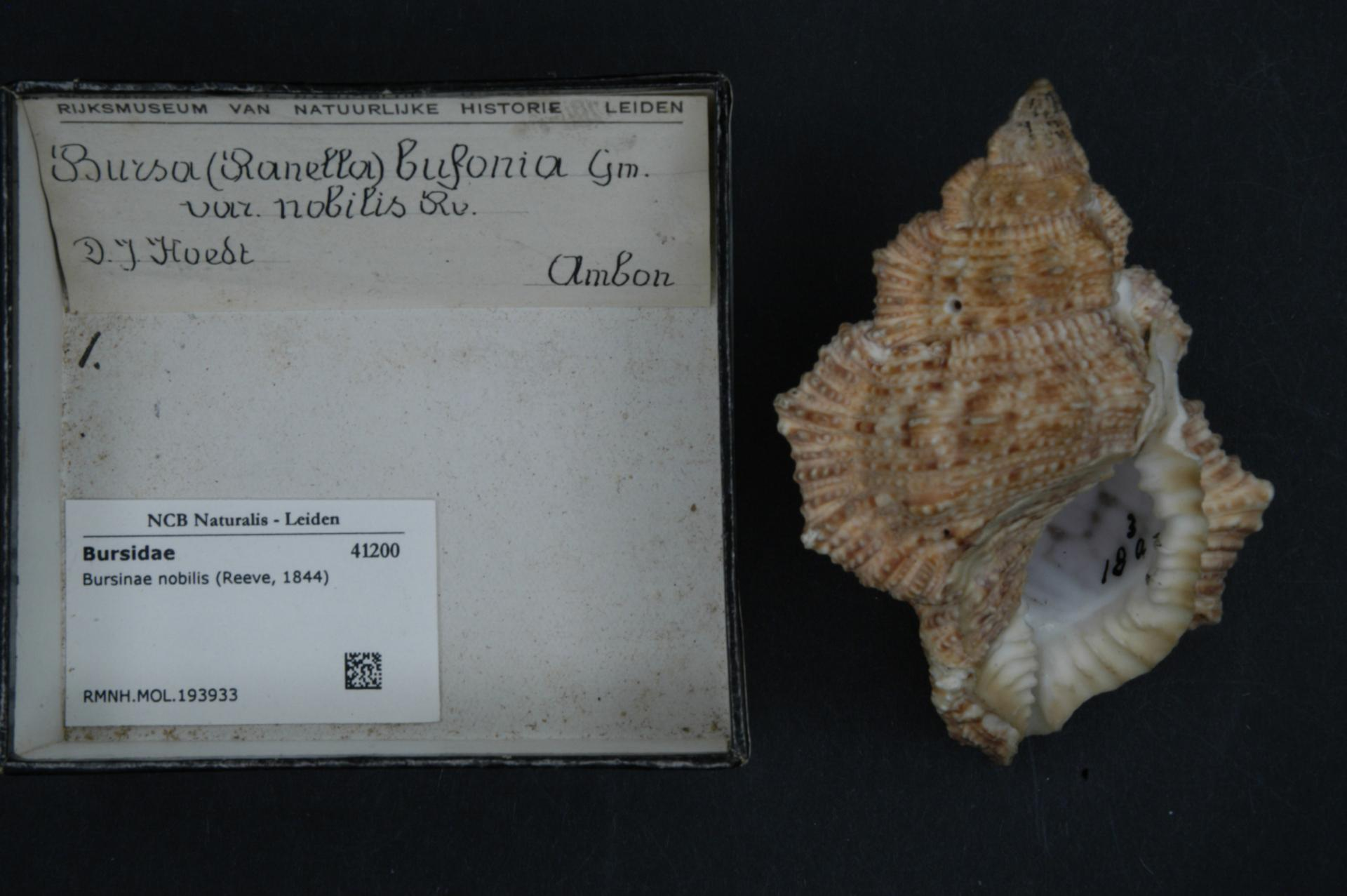
- Bursina nobilis shell

Scientific classification
- Kingdom: Animalia
- Phylum: Mollusca
- Class: Gastropoda
- Subclass: Caenogastropoda
- Order: Littorinimorpha
- Family: Bursidae
- Genus: Bursina; Oyama, 1964

Type species
- Ranella nobilis Reeve, 1844

= Bursina =

Genus of gastropods

Bursina is a genus of sea snails, marine gastropod mollusks in the family Bursidae, the frog shells.

== Species ==
Species within the genus Bursina include:

- Bursina borisbeckeri (Parth, 1996)
- Bursina fernandezi (Beu, 1977)
- Bursina fijiensis (Watson, 1881)
- Bursina gnorima (Melvilll, 1918)
- Bursina ignobilis (Beu, 1987)
- Bursina nobilis (Reeve, 1844)
