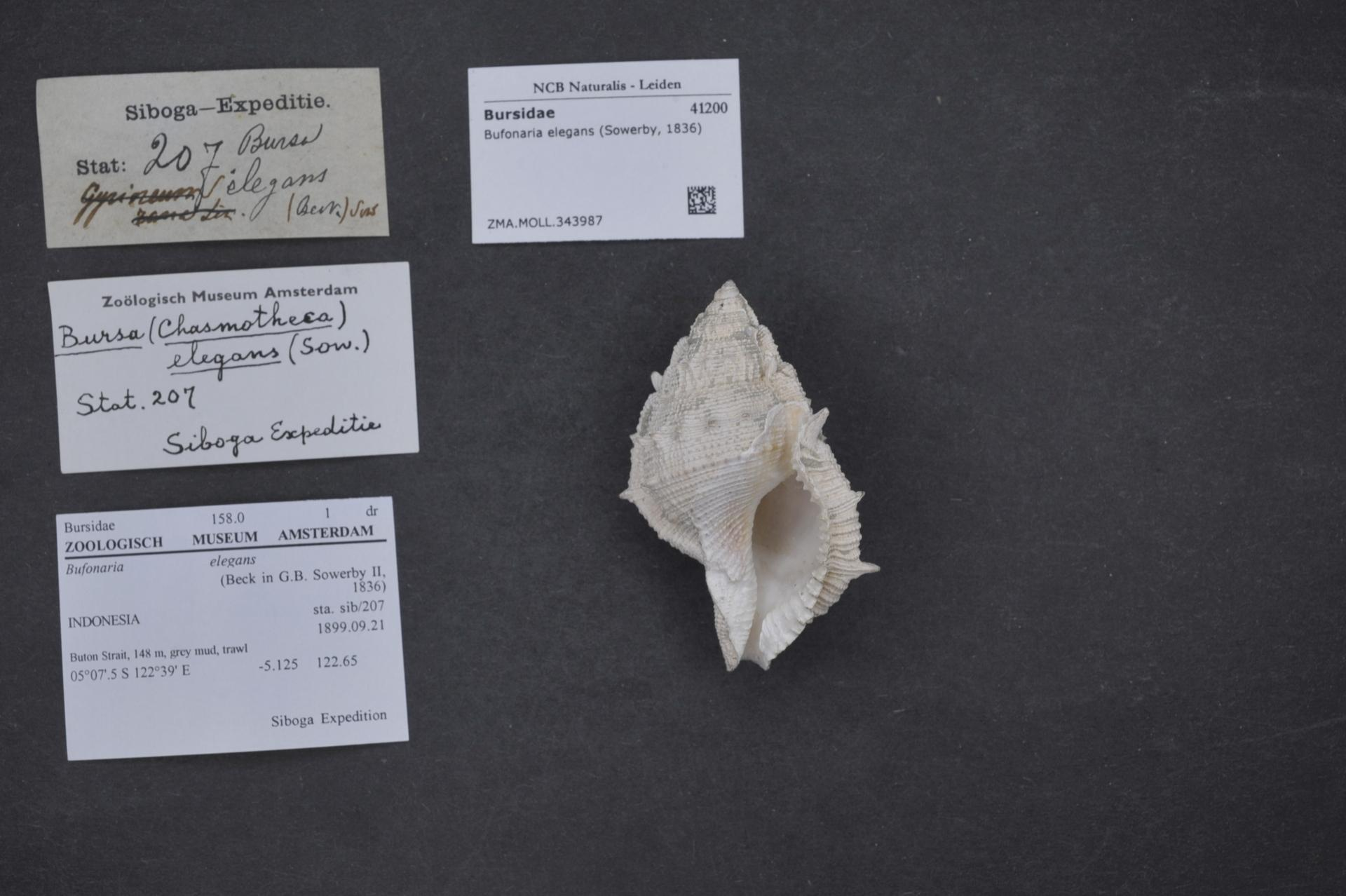

Scientific classification
- Kingdom: Animalia
- Phylum: Mollusca
- Class: Gastropoda
- Subclass: Caenogastropoda
- Order: Littorinimorpha
- Family: Bursidae
- Genus: Bufonaria
- Species: B. elegans

Binomial name
- Bufonaria elegans (G.B. Sowerby II, 1836)

Synonyms
- Ranella elegans G.B. Sowerby II, 1836

= Bufonaria elegans =

Species of gastropod

Bufonaria elegans is a species of sea snail, a marine gastropod mollusk in the family Bursidae, the frog shells.
