= Bufonaria cavitensis =

Scientific classification
- Kingdom: Animalia
- Phylum: Mollusca
- Class: Gastropoda
- Subclass: Caenogastropoda
- Order: Littorinimorpha
- Family: Bursidae
- Genus: Bufonaria
- Species: B. cavitensis

Binomial name
- Bufonaria cavitensis (Reeve, 1844)

Synonyms
- Ranella crumena var. cavitensis Reeve, 1844

Species of gastropod

Bufonaria cavitensis is a species of sea snail, a marine gastropod mollusc in the family Bursidae, the frog shells.
