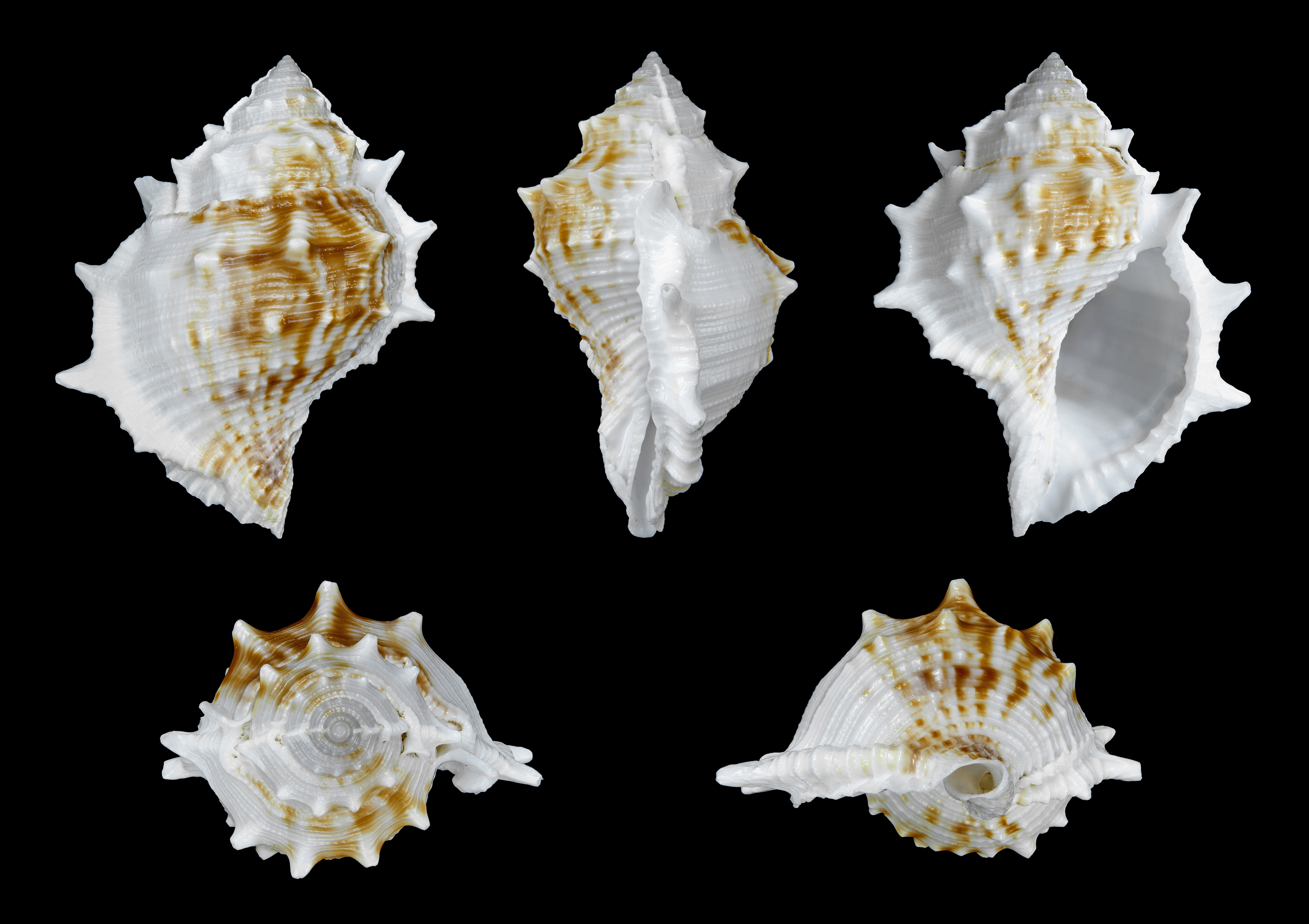
- Multiple views of Bufonaria rana (Linnaeus, 1758)
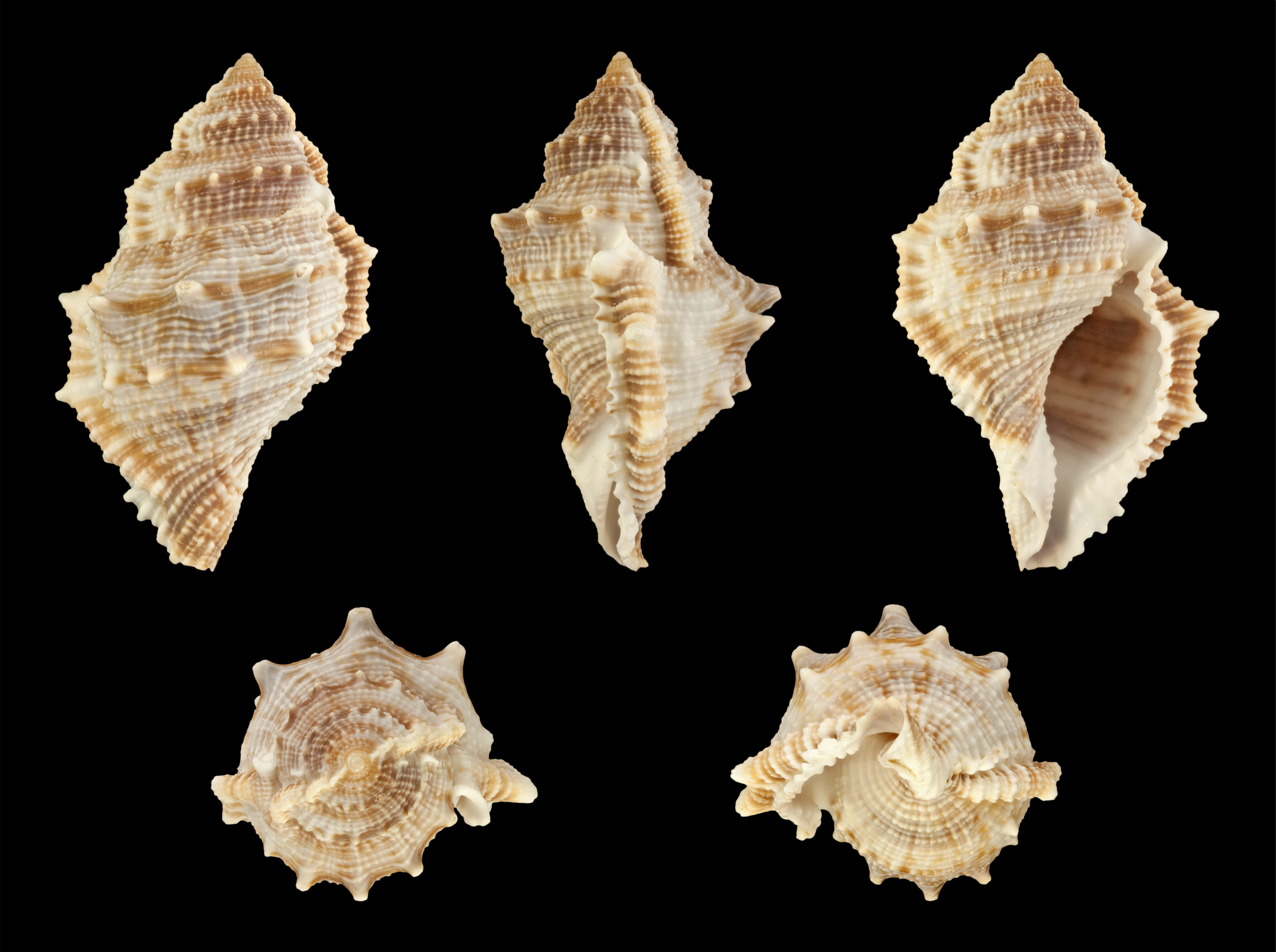

Scientific classification
- Kingdom: Animalia
- Phylum: Mollusca
- Class: Gastropoda
- Subclass: Caenogastropoda
- Order: Littorinimorpha
- Family: Bursidae
- Genus: Bufonaria
- Species: B. rana

Binomial name
- Bufonaria rana (Linnaeus, 1758)

Synonyms
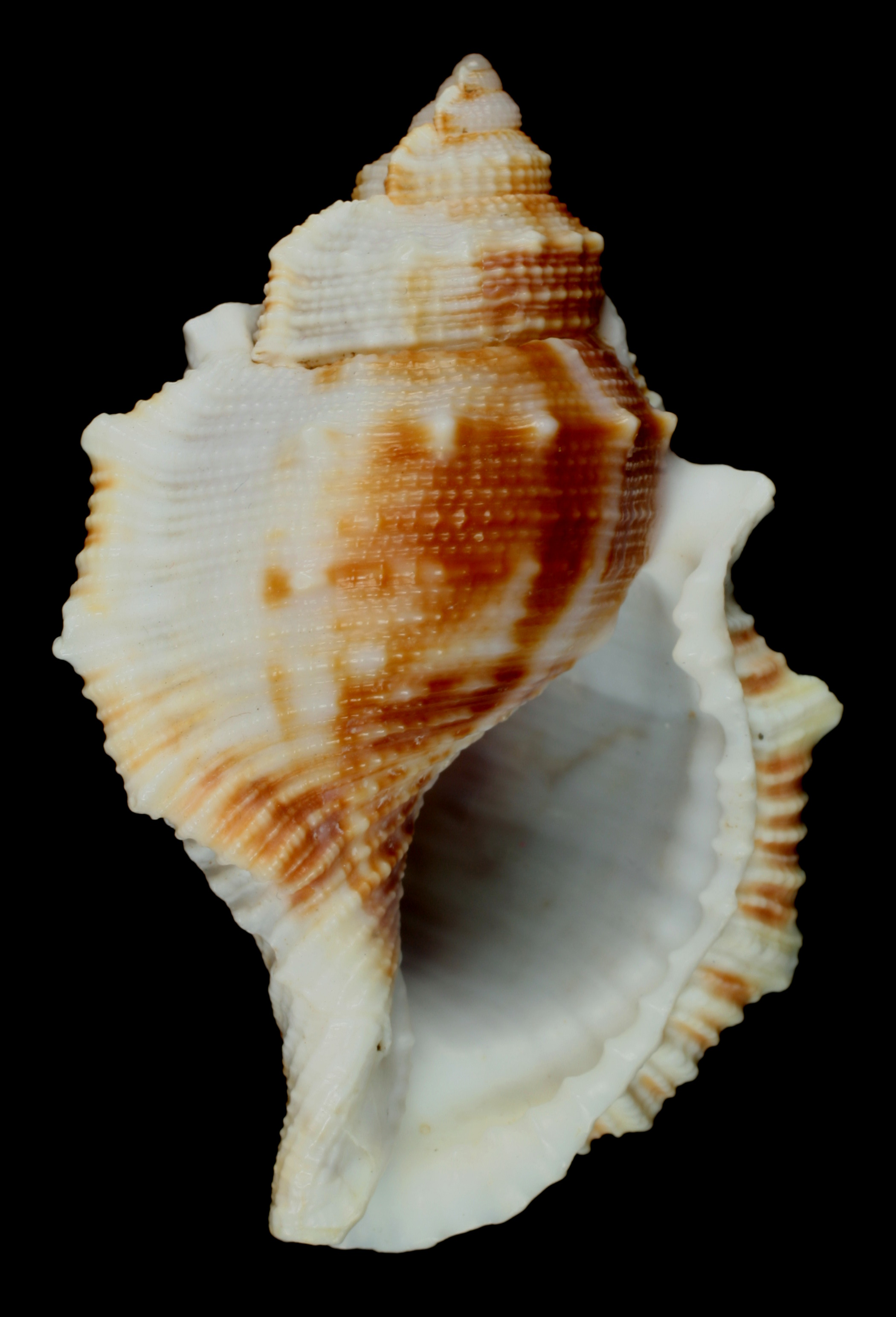
- Murex rana Linnaeus, 1758; Ranella albivaricosa Reeve, 1844; Ranella beckii Kiener, 1841; Ranella subgranosa G.B. Sowerby II, 1836 Apertural view of Bufonaria rana (Linnaeus, 1758)

= Bufonaria rana =

Species of gastropod

Bufonaria rana is a species of sea snail, a marine gastropod mollusk in the family Bursidae, the frog shells.
