= Bufonaria granosa =

Scientific classification
- Kingdom: Animalia
- Phylum: Mollusca
- Class: Gastropoda
- Subclass: Caenogastropoda
- Order: Littorinimorpha
- Family: Bursidae
- Genus: Bufonaria
- Species: B. granosa

Binomial name
- Bufonaria granosa (Martin, 1884)

Synonyms
- Ranella spinosa var. granosa Martin, 1884

Species of gastropod

Bufonaria granosa is a species of sea snail, a marine gastropod mollusk in the family Bursidae, the frog shells.
