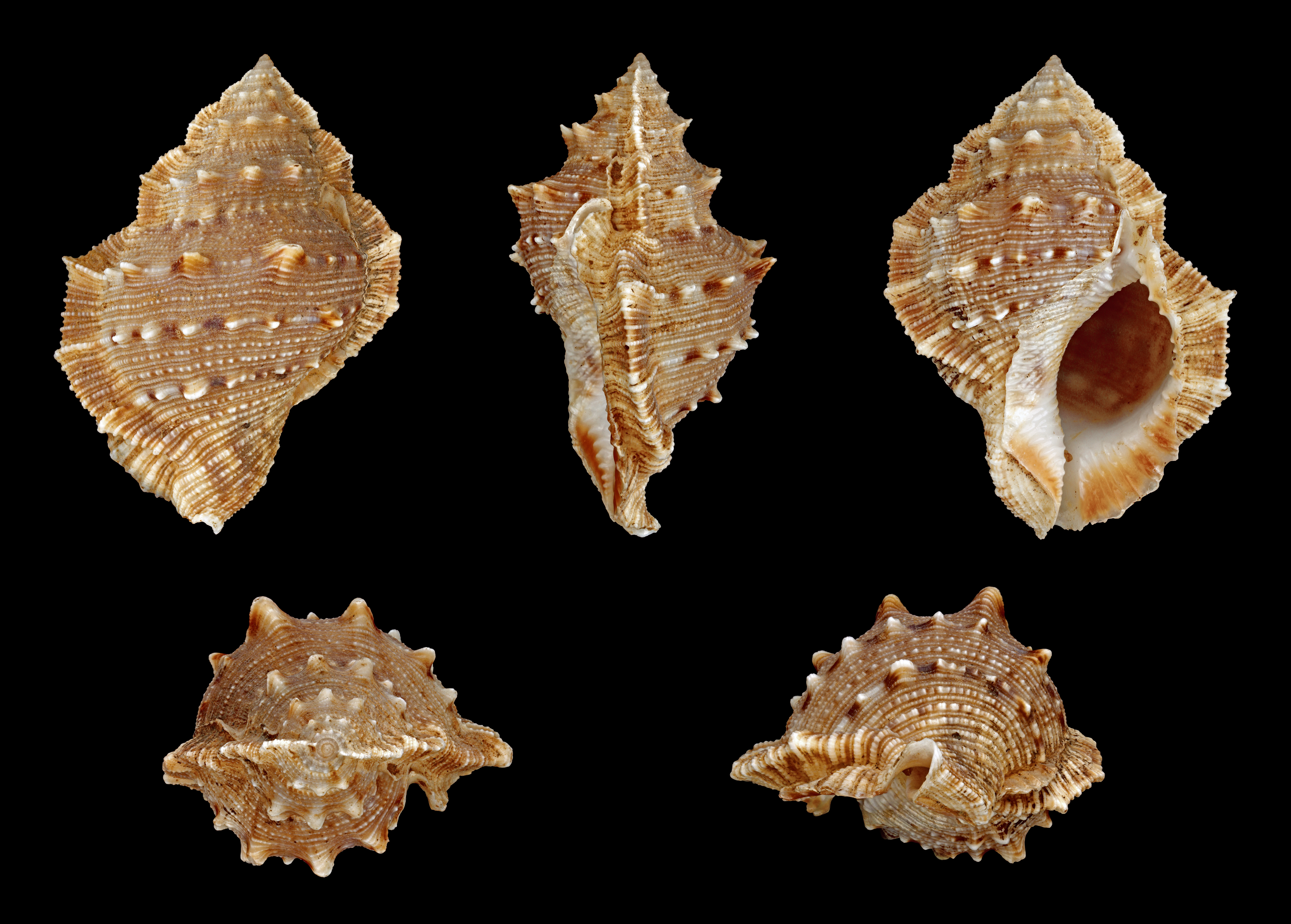
- Shell of Bufonaria crumena

Scientific classification
- Kingdom: Animalia
- Phylum: Mollusca
- Class: Gastropoda
- Subclass: Caenogastropoda
- Order: Littorinimorpha
- Family: Bursidae
- Genus: Bufonaria
- Species: B. crumena

Binomial name
- Bufonaria crumena (Lamarck, 1816)

Synonyms
- Bursa crumena (Lamarck, 1816); Ranella crumena Lamarck, 1816; Ranella crumenoides sensu Blainville Valenciennes, 1832

= Bufonaria crumena =

Species of gastropod

Bufonaria crumena is a species of sea snail, a marine gastropod mollusk in the family Bursidae, the frog shells.

== Distribution ==
This species occurs in the Indian Ocean off Tanzania, Mozambique, Madagascar and the Mascarene Basin.
