= Bursina borisbeckeri =

Scientific classification
- Kingdom: Animalia
- Phylum: Mollusca
- Class: Gastropoda
- Subclass: Caenogastropoda
- Order: Littorinimorpha
- Family: Bursidae
- Genus: Bursina
- Species: B. borisbeckeri

Binomial name
- Bursina borisbeckeri (Parth, 1996)

Synonyms
- Bufonaria (Bufonaria) borisbeckeri Parth, 1996

Species of gastropod

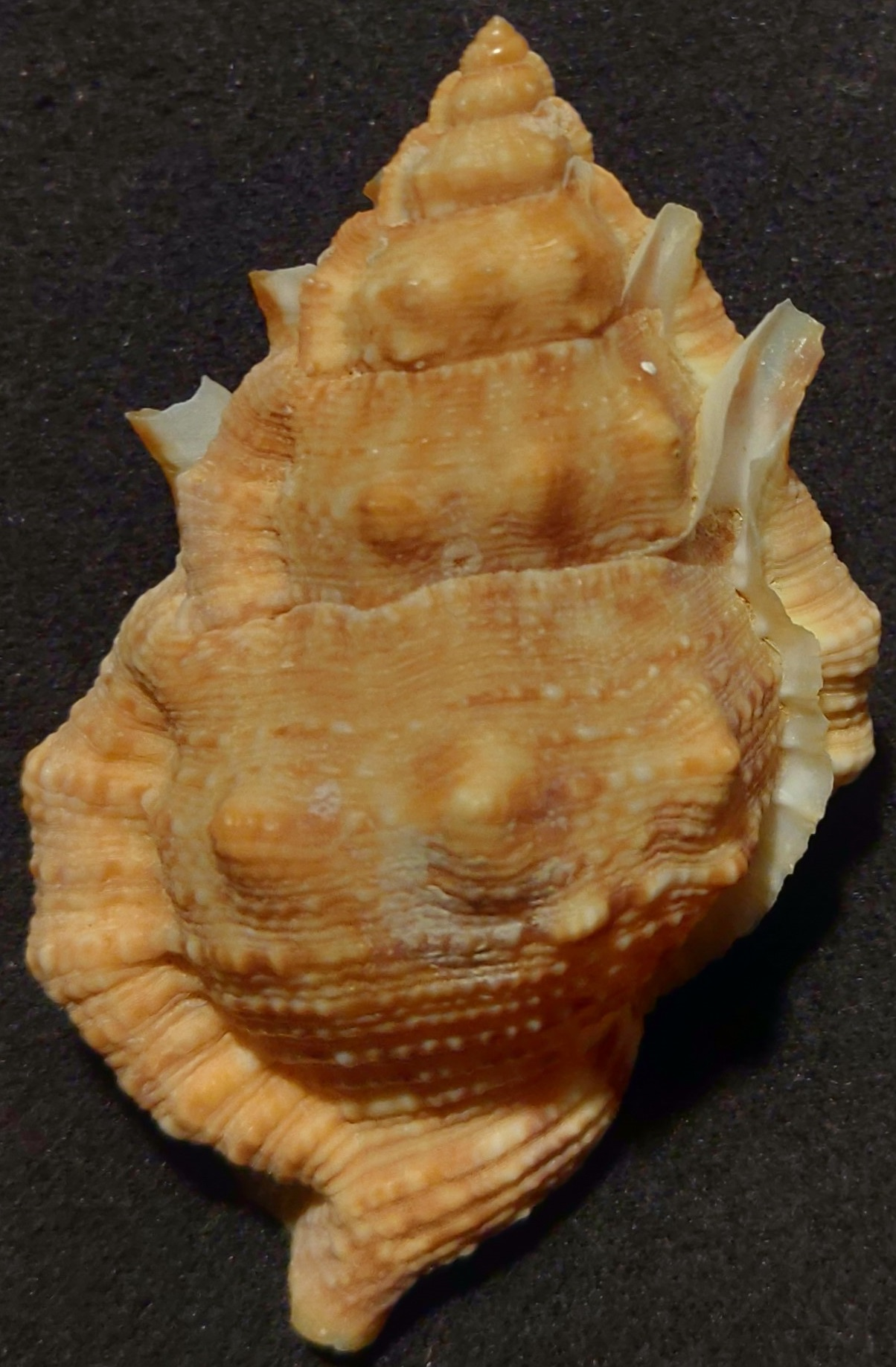

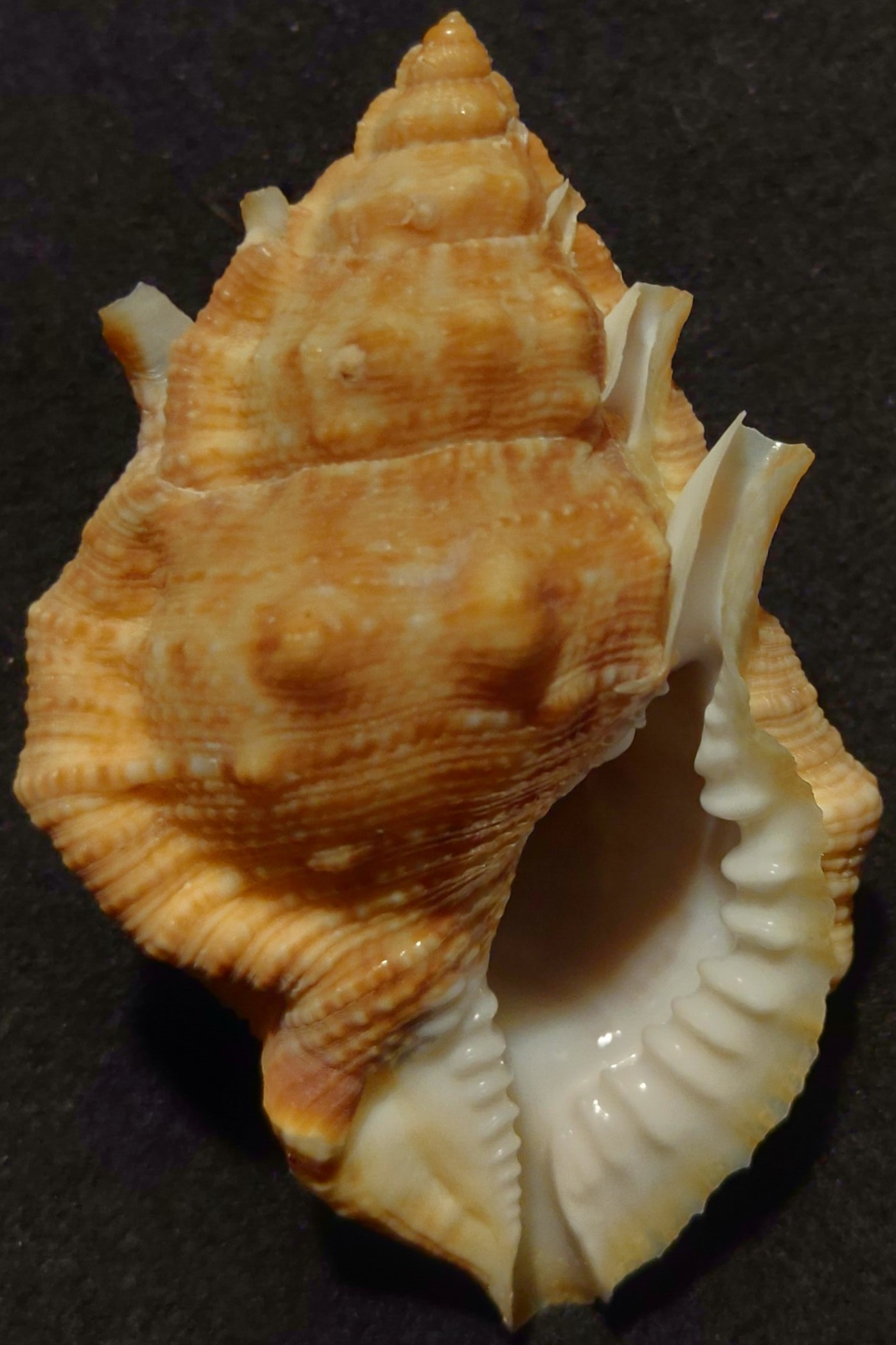

Bursina borisbeckeri is a species of sea snail, a marine gastropod mollusk in the family Bursidae, the frog shells.

The species is named after the German tennis player, Boris Becker.

The distinction from Bursina gnorima is uncertain. The shell size varies between 30 and 52 mm. This species is distributed in the seas along the Philippines.

== See also ==
- List of organisms named after famous people (born 1950–1974)
