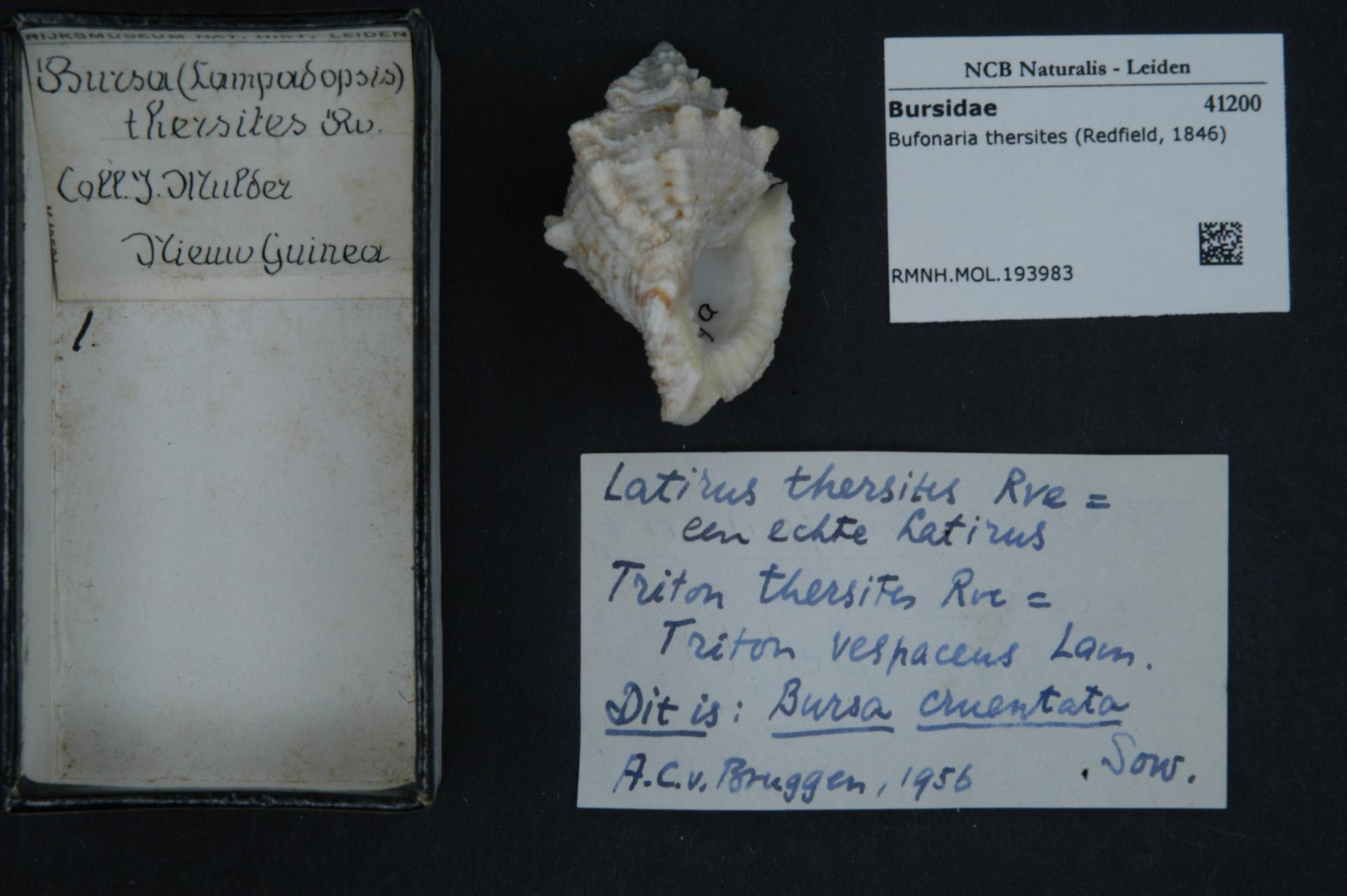
- Bufonaria thersites shell

Scientific classification
- Kingdom: Animalia
- Phylum: Mollusca
- Class: Gastropoda
- Subclass: Caenogastropoda
- Order: Littorinimorpha
- Family: Bursidae
- Genus: Bufonaria
- Species: B. thersites

Binomial name
- Bufonaria thersites (Redfield, 1846)

Synonyms
- Ranella thersites Redfield, 1846

= Bufonaria thersites =

Species of gastropod

Bufonaria thersites is a species of sea snail, a marine gastropod mollusk in the family Bursidae, the frog shells.
