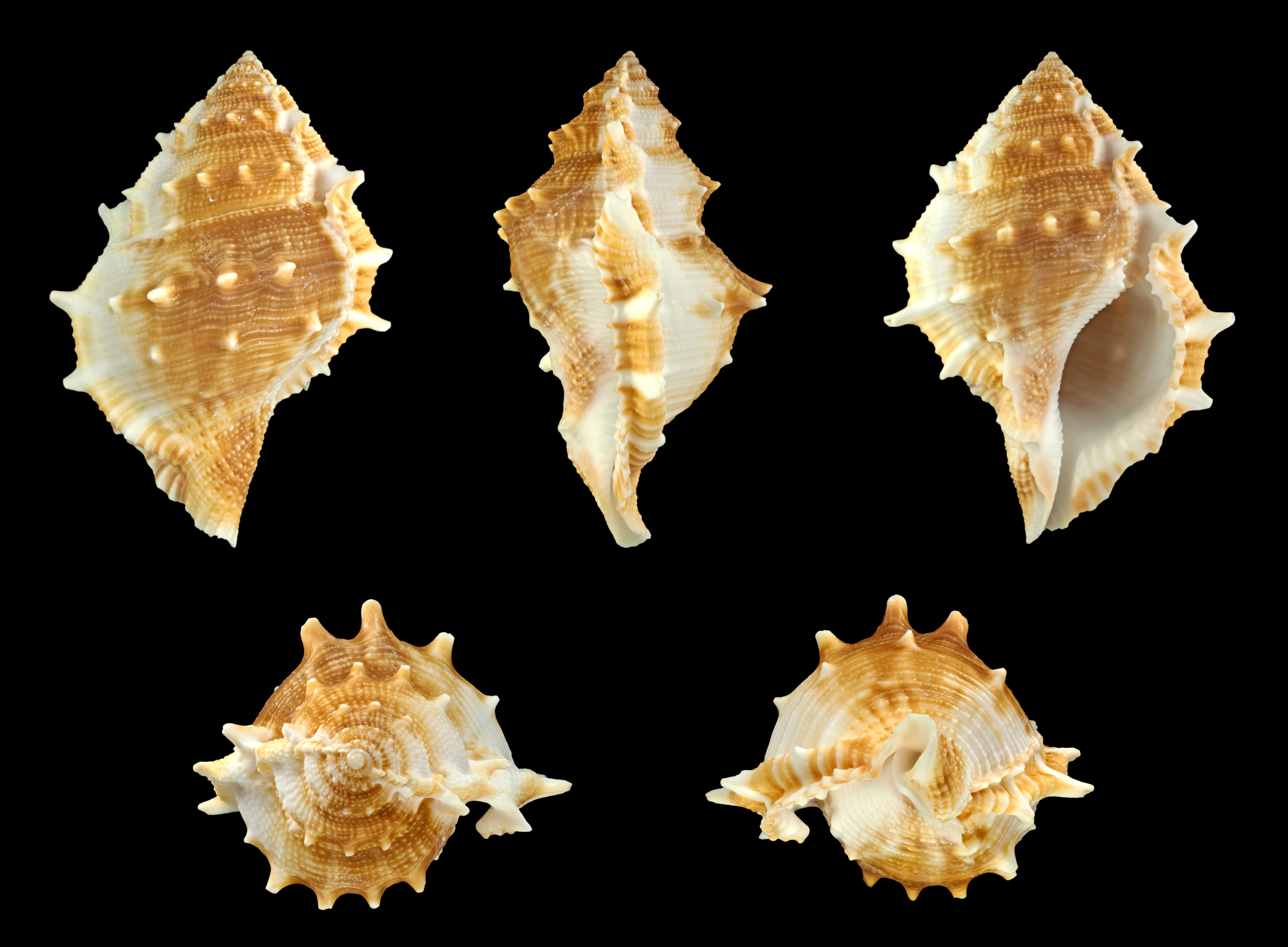
- Five views of a shell of Bufonaria perelegans

Scientific classification
- Kingdom: Animalia
- Phylum: Mollusca
- Class: Gastropoda
- Subclass: Caenogastropoda
- Order: Littorinimorpha
- Family: Bursidae
- Genus: Bufonaria
- Species: B. perelegans

Binomial name
- Bufonaria perelegans Beu, 1987

Synonyms
- Bufonaria (Bufonaria) perelegans Beu, 1987; Gyrineum elegantula Sowerby

= Bufonaria perelegans =

Species of gastropod

Bufonaria perelegans is a species of sea snail, a marine gastropod mollusk in the frog shellfamily, Bursidae.

== Description ==
Typical shell size of B. perelegans ranges from 65 mm to 70 mm in width and 96 mm to 120 mm in height, making it the largest species of its genus. Its elongated varices are perfectly aligned along the spires, its surface sculpture is finely gemmate (bud-like), and its overall shape is oblong, compressed dorso-ventrally. These three morphological features are in keeping with almost all other species in the genus Bufonaria.

== Distribution ==
B. perelegans can be found in Pacific waters off the Philippines, Taiwan, Indonesia, Malaysia and Thailand.
