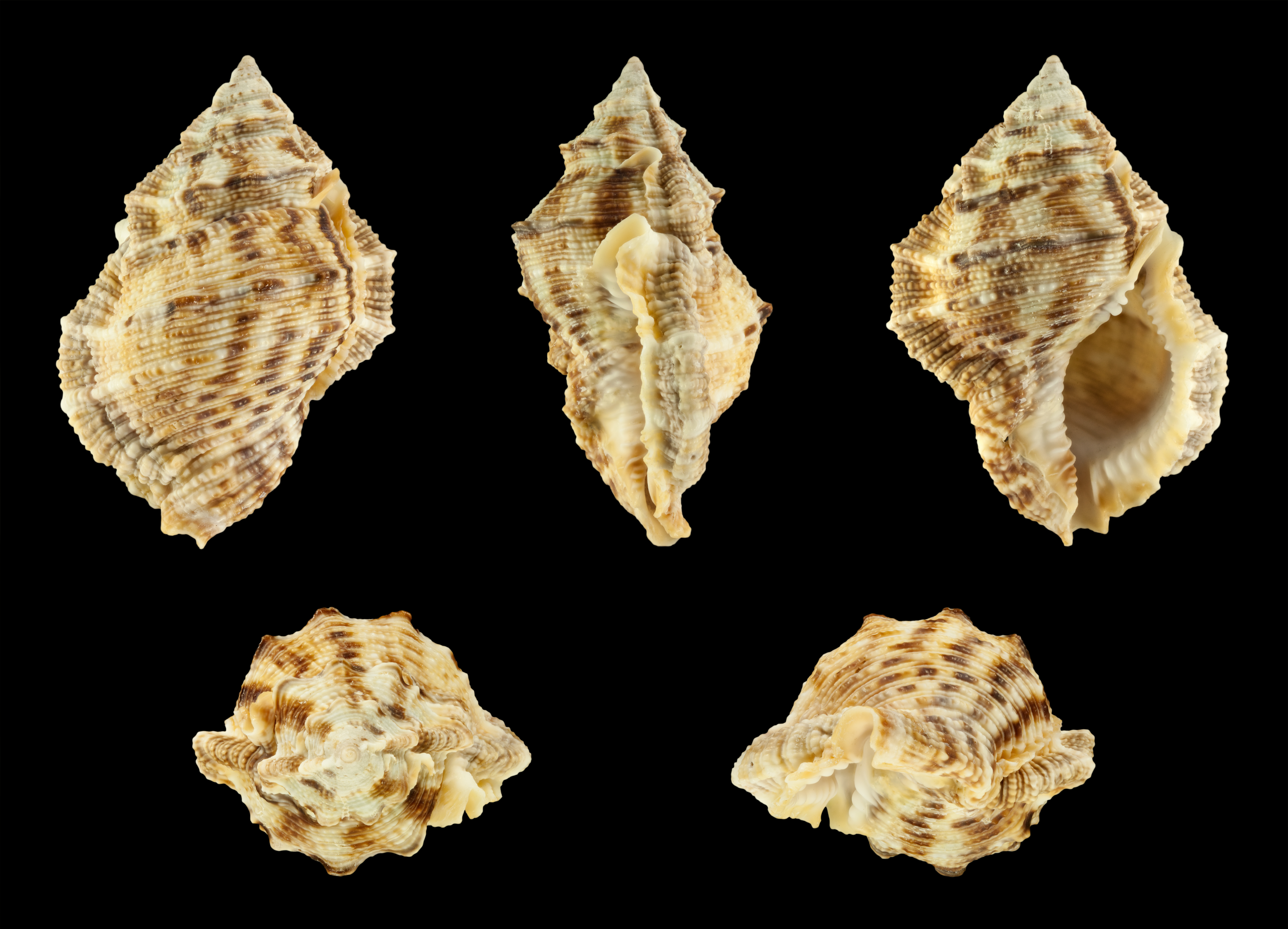

Scientific classification
- Kingdom: Animalia
- Phylum: Mollusca
- Class: Gastropoda
- Subclass: Caenogastropoda
- Order: Littorinimorpha
- Family: Bursidae
- Genus: Bufonaria
- Species: B. margaritula

Binomial name
- Bufonaria margaritula (Deshayes, 1832)

Synonyms
- Bufonaria (Chasmotheca) margaritula (Deshayes, 1832); Bursa margaritula (Deshayes, 1833); Chasmotheca margaritula (Deshayes, 1833); Gyrineum pacator Iredale, 1931; Ranella margaritula Deshayes, 1832 (basionym); Ranella neglecta G.B. Sowerby II, 1836

= Bufonaria margaritula =

Species of gastropod

Bufonaria margaritula is a species of sea snail, a marine gastropod mollusk in the family Bursidae, the frog shells.

Alternative combinations: Bufonaria margaritula, Bursa (Bursa) margaritula, Bursa margaritula, Chasmotheca margaritula,

Parent taxon: Bufonaria (Bufonaria) according to A. G. Beu 2005

== Distribution ==
This marine species occurs off the Malabar Coast.
