= Bursina fernandezi =

Scientific classification
- Kingdom: Animalia
- Phylum: Mollusca
- Class: Gastropoda
- Subclass: Caenogastropoda
- Order: Littorinimorpha
- Family: Bursidae
- Genus: Bursina
- Species: B. fernandezi

Binomial name
- Bursina fernandezi (Beu, 1977)

Synonyms
- Bufonaria fernandezi Beu, 1977

Species of gastropod

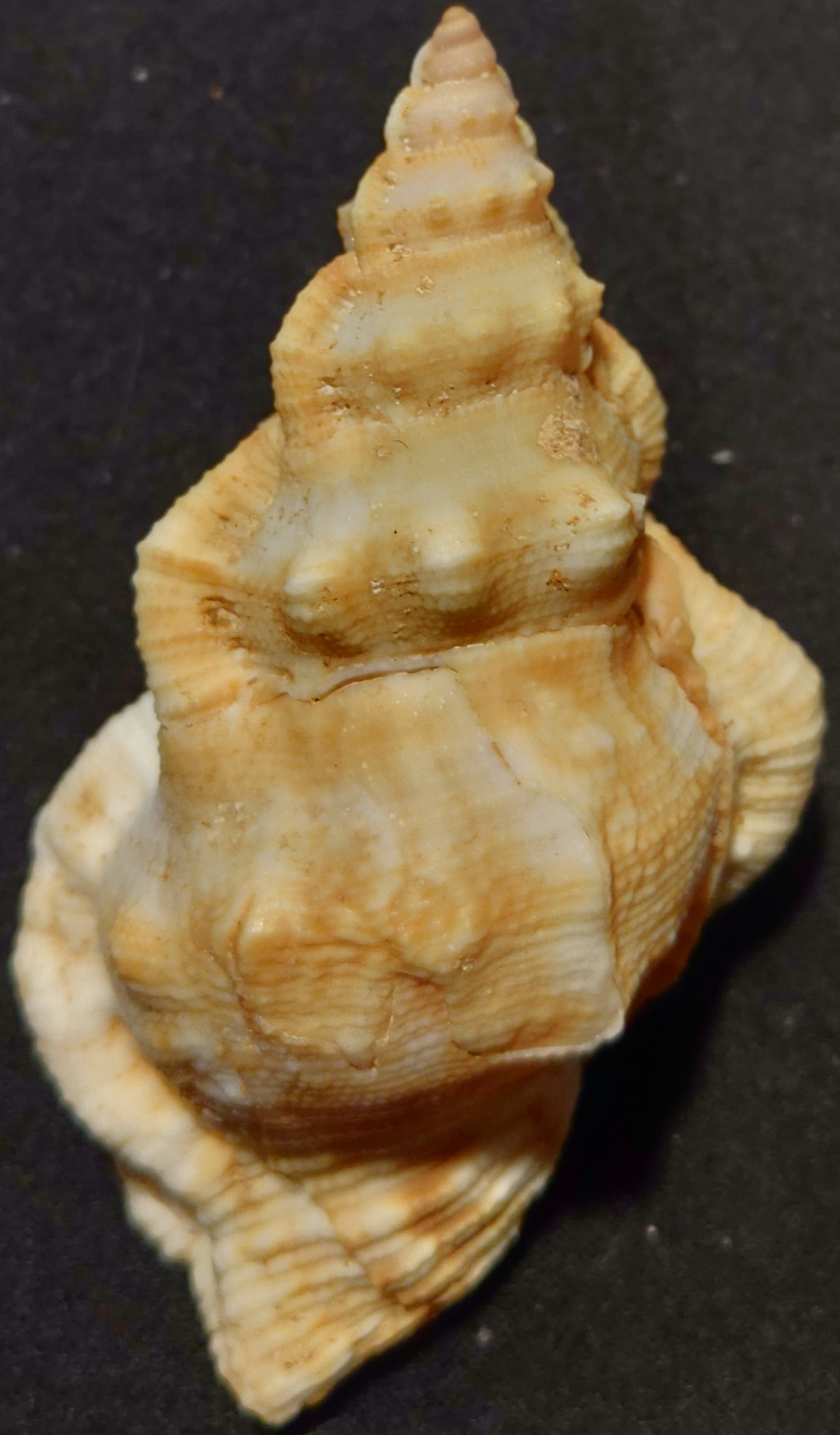

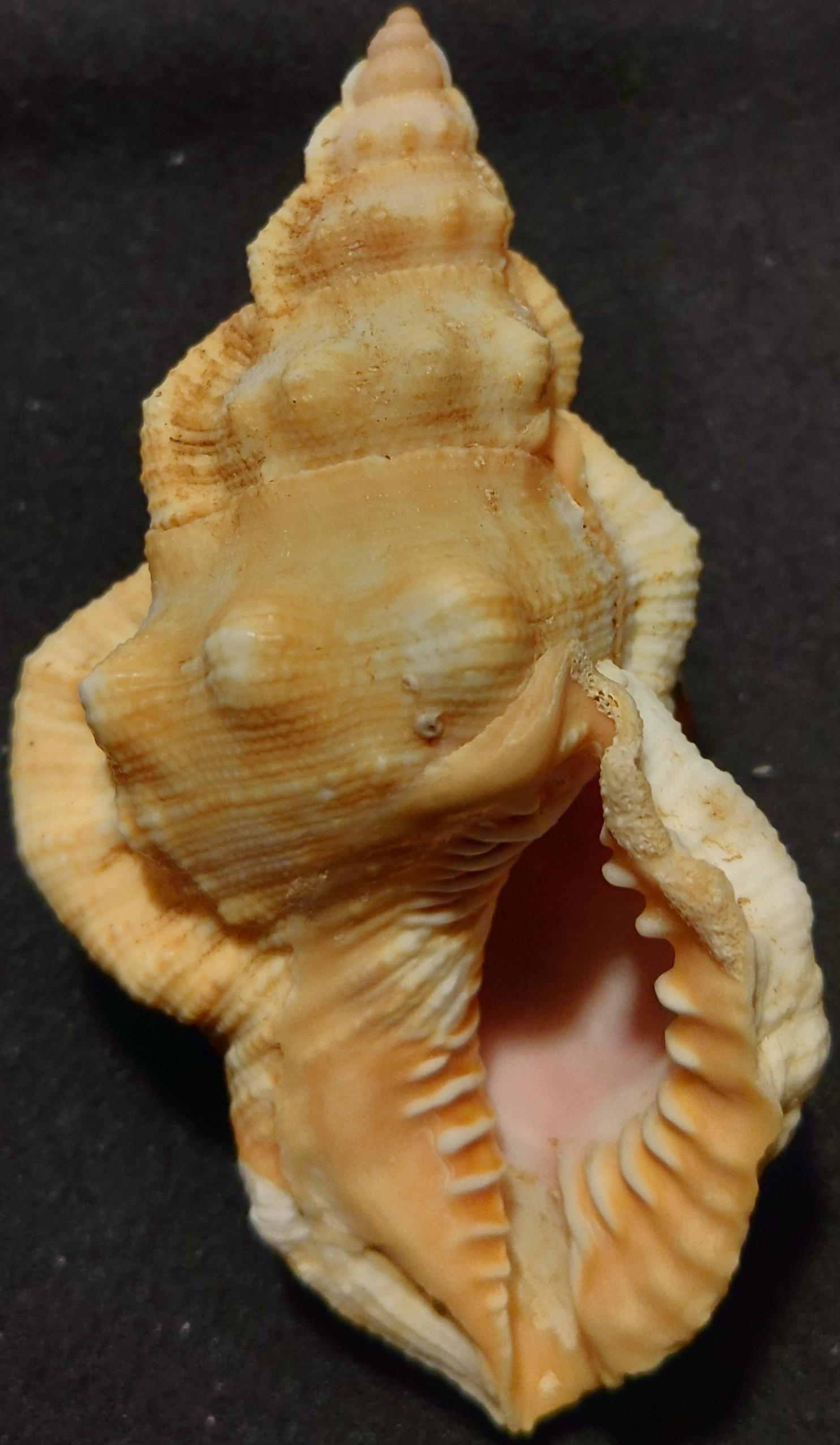

Bursina fernandezi is a species of sea snail, a marine gastropod mollusk in the family Bursidae, the frog shells.
