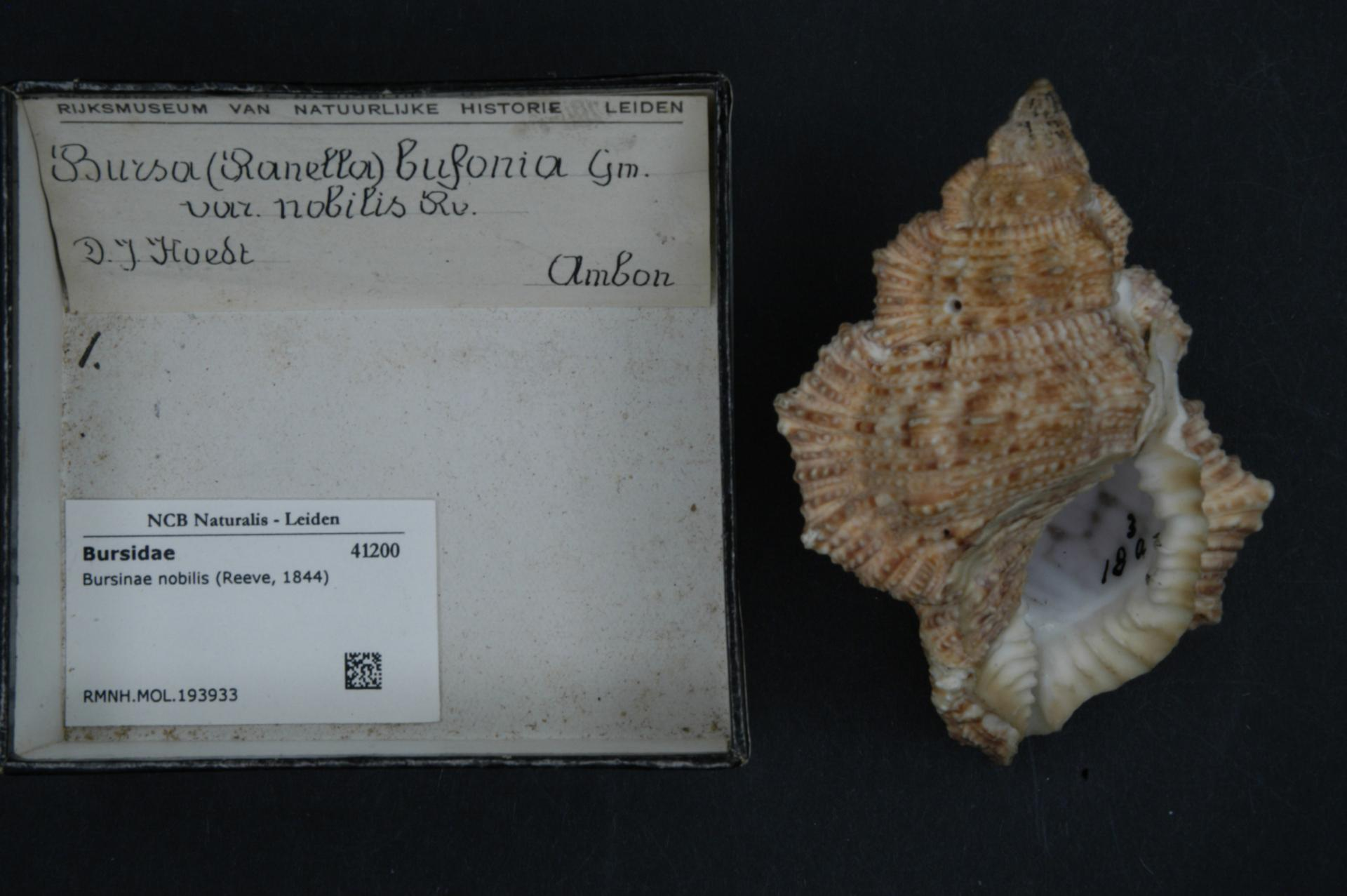
- Bursina nobilis shell

Scientific classification
- Kingdom: Animalia
- Phylum: Mollusca
- Class: Gastropoda
- Subclass: Caenogastropoda
- Order: Littorinimorpha
- Family: Bursidae
- Genus: Bursina
- Species: B. nobilis

Binomial name
- Bursina nobilis (Reeve, 1844)

Synonyms
- Bufonaria (Bufonaria) nobilis (Reeve, L.A., 1844); Bursa nobilis (Reeve, 1844); Ranella nobilis Reeve, 1844

= Bursina nobilis =

Species of gastropod

Bursina nobilis, common name the noble frog shell, is a species of sea snail, a marine gastropod mollusc in the family Bursidae, the frog shells.

== Description ==
The length of the shell varies between 25 mm and 113 mm.

== Distribution ==
This marine species occurs off Mozambique and the Philippines.
