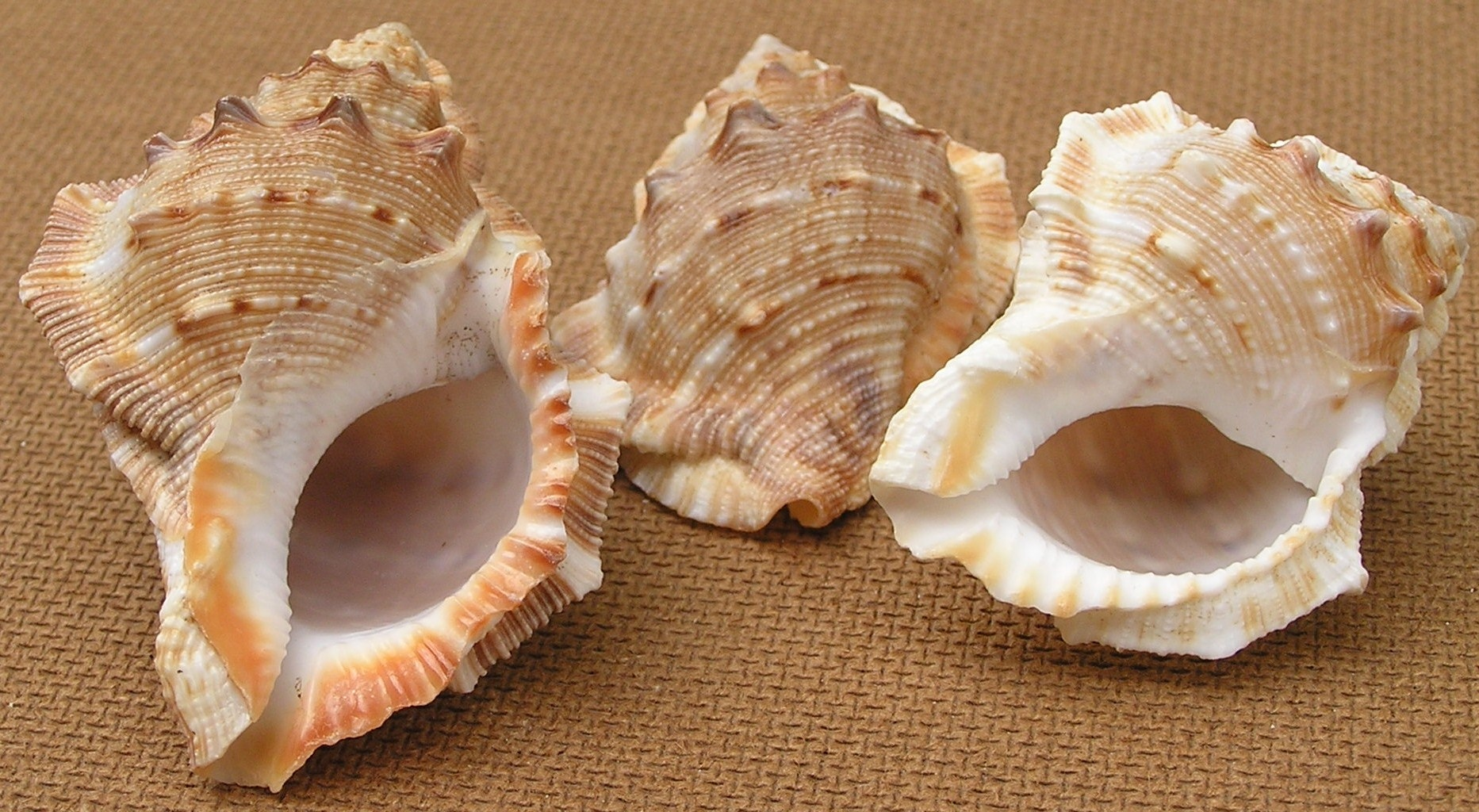
- Bufonaria foliata shells

Scientific classification
- Kingdom: Animalia
- Phylum: Mollusca
- Class: Gastropoda
- Subclass: Caenogastropoda
- Order: Littorinimorpha
- Family: Bursidae
- Genus: Bufonaria
- Species: B. foliata

Binomial name
- Bufonaria foliata (Broderip, 1826)

Synonyms
- Bufonaria (Aspa) foliata (Broderip, W.J., 1825); Ranella foliata Broderip, 1826; Tutufa (Tutufa) foliata Broderip, W.J., 1824

= Bufonaria foliata =

Species of gastropod

Bufonaria foliata, common name the frilled frog shell, is a species of sea snail, a marine gastropod mollusk in the family Bursidae, the frog shells.

== Description ==
The length of the shell varies between 30 mm and 115 mm.

== Distribution ==
This marine species occurs in the Indian Ocean off KwaZulu-Natal, South Africa, and Somalia.
