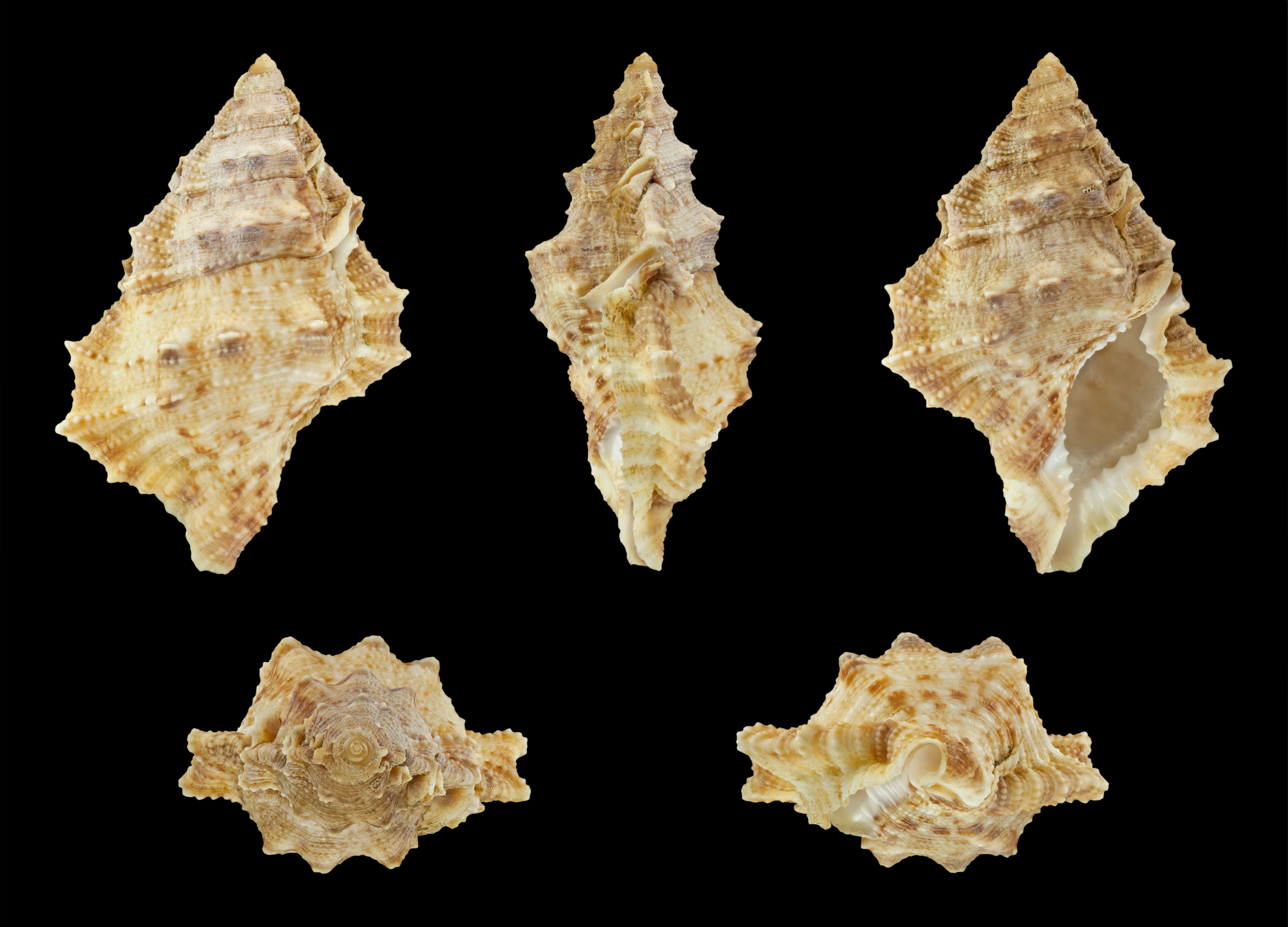

Scientific classification
- Kingdom: Animalia
- Phylum: Mollusca
- Class: Gastropoda
- Subclass: Caenogastropoda
- Order: Littorinimorpha
- Family: Bursidae
- Genus: Bursina
- Species: B. ignobilis

Binomial name
- Bursina ignobilis (Beu, 1987)

Synonyms
- Bufonaria ignobilis Beu, 1987

= Bursina ignobilis =

Species of gastropod

Bursina ignobilis is a species of sea snail, a marine gastropod mollusk in the family Bursidae, the frog shells.
