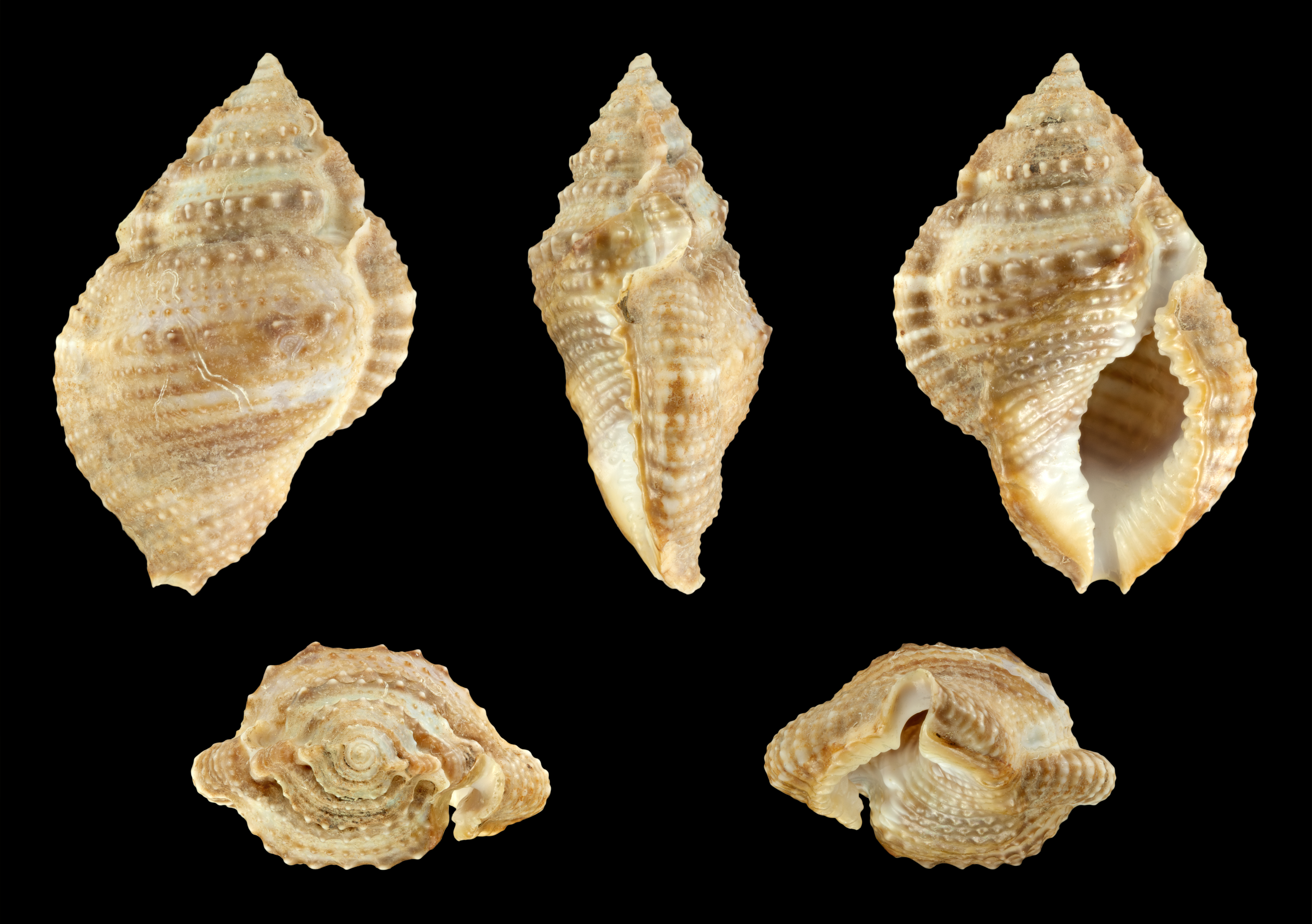
- Bursina gnorima shell

Scientific classification
- Kingdom: Animalia
- Phylum: Mollusca
- Class: Gastropoda
- Subclass: Caenogastropoda
- Order: Littorinimorpha
- Family: Bursidae
- Genus: Bursina
- Species: B. gnorima

Binomial name
- Bursina gnorima (Melvill, 1918)

Synonyms
- Bursa (Bursa) koperbergae van Regteren Altena, 1942; Bursa gnorima Melvill, 1918

= Bursina gnorima =

Species of gastropod

Bursina gnorima is a species of sea snail, a marine gastropod mollusk in the family Bursidae, the frog shells.
