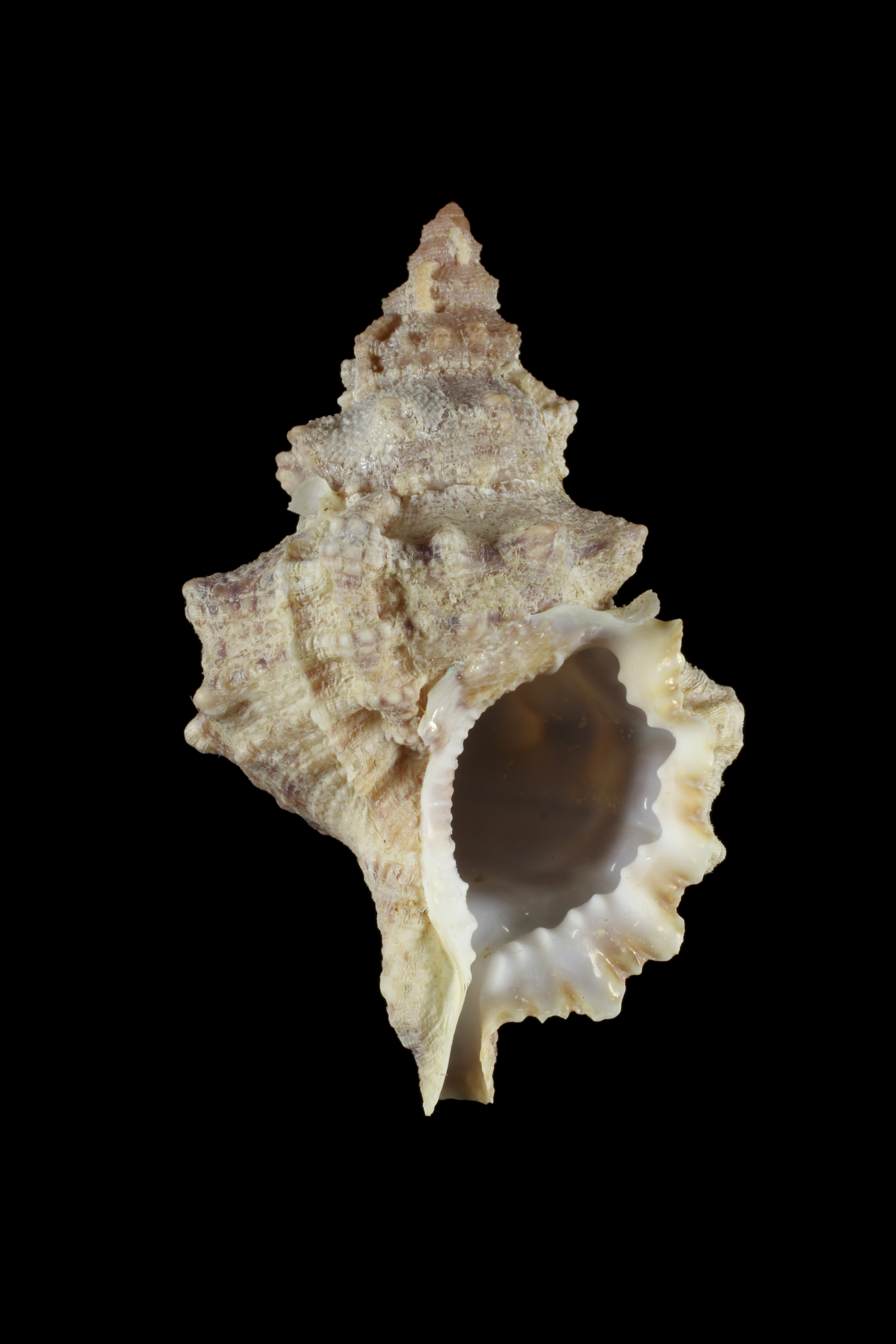
- Tutufa tenuigranosa shell (specimen at MNHN, Paris)

Scientific classification
- Kingdom: Animalia
- Phylum: Mollusca
- Class: Gastropoda
- Subclass: Caenogastropoda
- Order: Littorinimorpha
- Superfamily: Tonnoidea
- Family: Bursidae
- Genus: Tutufa
- Species: T. tenuigranosa

Binomial name
- Tutufa tenuigranosa (E. A. Smith, 1914)

Synonyms
- Bursa (Tutufa) rubeta var. tenuigranosa E.A. Smith, 1914; Bursa tenuigranosa E. A. Smith, 1914 (unaccepted combination); Tutufa (Tutufa) tenuigranosa (E. A. Smith, 1914) · alternate representation

= Tutufa tenuigranosa =

Species of gastropod

Tutufa tenuigranosa is a species of sea snail, a marine gastropod mollusk in the family Bursidae, the frog shells.

== Description ==
(Original description) The species might perhaps be regarded as a sculptured form of Tutufa bardeyi (F.P. Jousseaume, 1881). The aperture, columellar callus, and outer lip are entirely white. The columella is finely li above and more strongly anteriorly. The peculiarity of this species is the much finer granulation of the surface. The largest specimen is 193 mm in length.

== Distribution ==
This marine species occurs off the Philippines, India and in the South China Sea.
