= Tutufa nigrita =

Scientific classification
- Kingdom: Animalia
- Phylum: Mollusca
- Class: Gastropoda
- Subclass: Caenogastropoda
- Order: Littorinimorpha
- Family: Bursidae
- Genus: Tutufa
- Species: T. nigrita

Binomial name
- Tutufa nigrita Mühlhäusser & Blöcher, 1979

Synonyms
- Bursa nigrita Mulhauser & Blocher, 1979; Tutufa nigrita Mühlhäusser & Blöcher, 1979

Species of gastropod

Tutufa (Tutufella) nigrita, common name the blackened frog shell, is a species of sea snail, a marine gastropod mollusc in the family Bursidae, the frog shells.

== Description ==
The length of the shell varies between 55 mm and 85 mm.

== Distribution ==
This marine species occurs off Madagascar and Mozambique.
