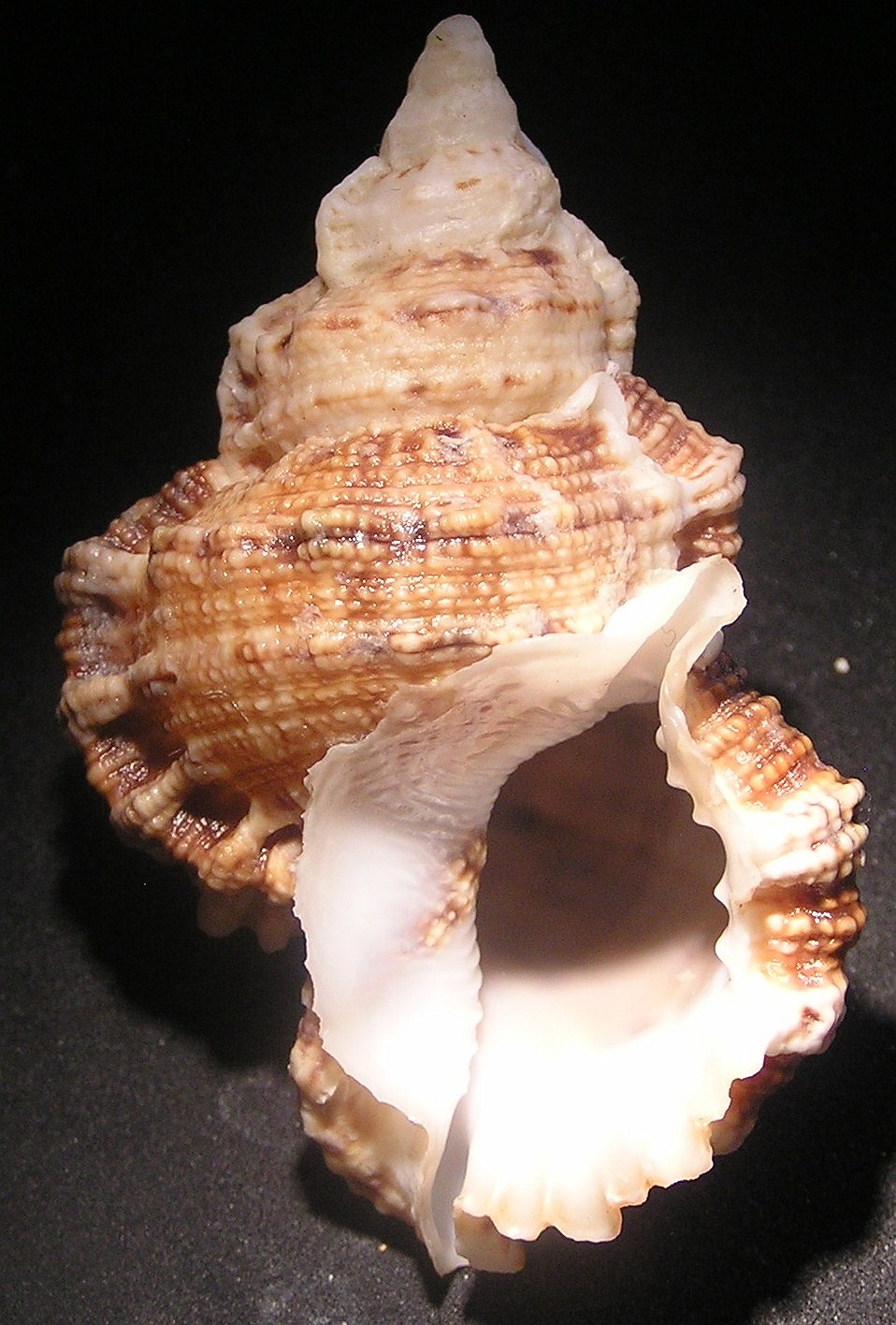

Scientific classification
- Kingdom: Animalia
- Phylum: Mollusca
- Class: Gastropoda
- Subclass: Caenogastropoda
- Order: Littorinimorpha
- Family: Bursidae
- Genus: Tutufa
- Species: T. boholica

Binomial name
- Tutufa boholica Beu, 1987

= Tutufa boholica =

Species of gastropod

Tutufa (Tutufella) boholica is a species of sea snail, a marine gastropod mollusk in the family Bursidae, the frog shells.

== Description ==
The shell size varies between 75mm and 120 mm.

== Distribution ==
This species is found along the Philippines.
