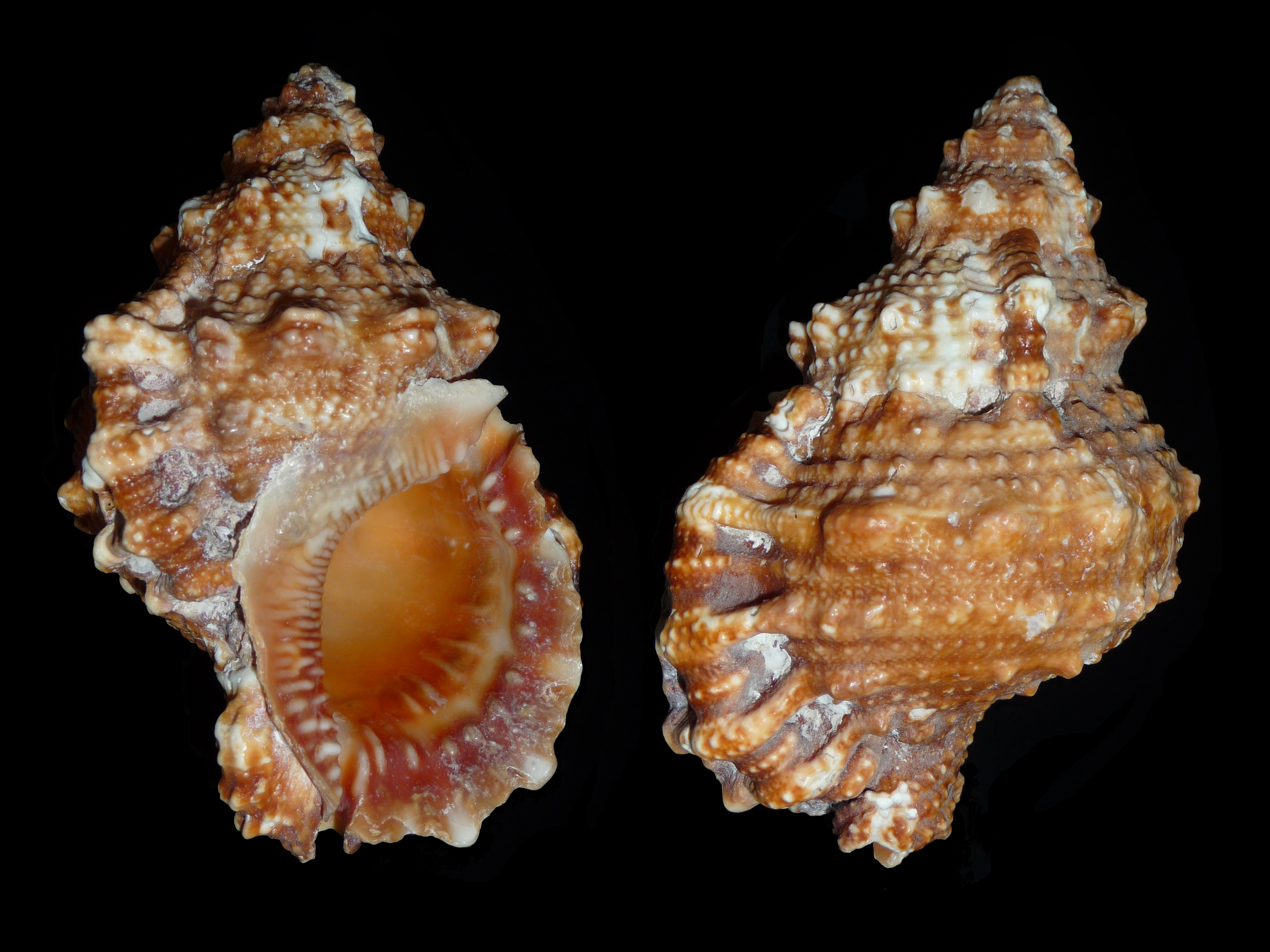
- shell of Tutufa rubeta

Scientific classification
- Kingdom: Animalia
- Phylum: Mollusca
- Class: Gastropoda
- Subclass: Caenogastropoda
- Order: Littorinimorpha
- Family: Bursidae
- Genus: Tutufa
- Species: T. rubeta

Binomial name
- Tutufa rubeta (Linnaeus, 1758)

Synonyms
- Biplex tuberculus Perry, 1811; Bursa (Tutufa) rubeta (Linnaeus, 1758); Bursa rubeta (Linnaeus, 1758) (unaccepted combination); Lampas caledonensis Jousseaume, 1881; Lampas hians Schumacher, 1817; Murex rana var. rubeta Linnaeus, 1758; Tritonium tuberosum Röding, 1798; Tutufa (Tutufella) rubeta (Linnaeus, 1758)

= Tutufa rubeta =

Species of gastropod

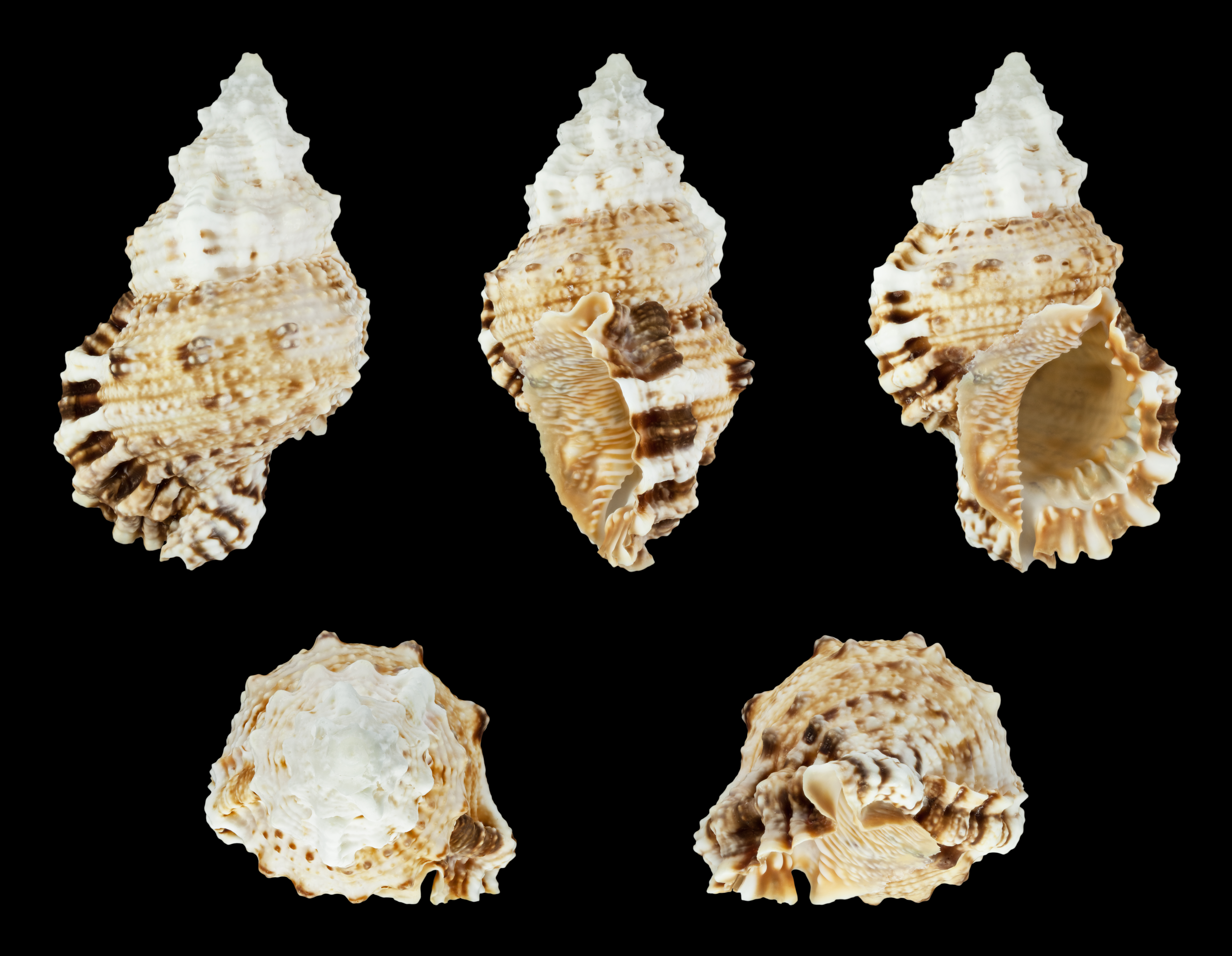
Brown form

Tutufa rubeta is a species of sea snail, a marine gastropod mollusk in the family Bursidae, the frog shells.

== Description ==
The length of the shell attains 95 mm.

== Distribution ==
This marine species occurs off the Philippines.
