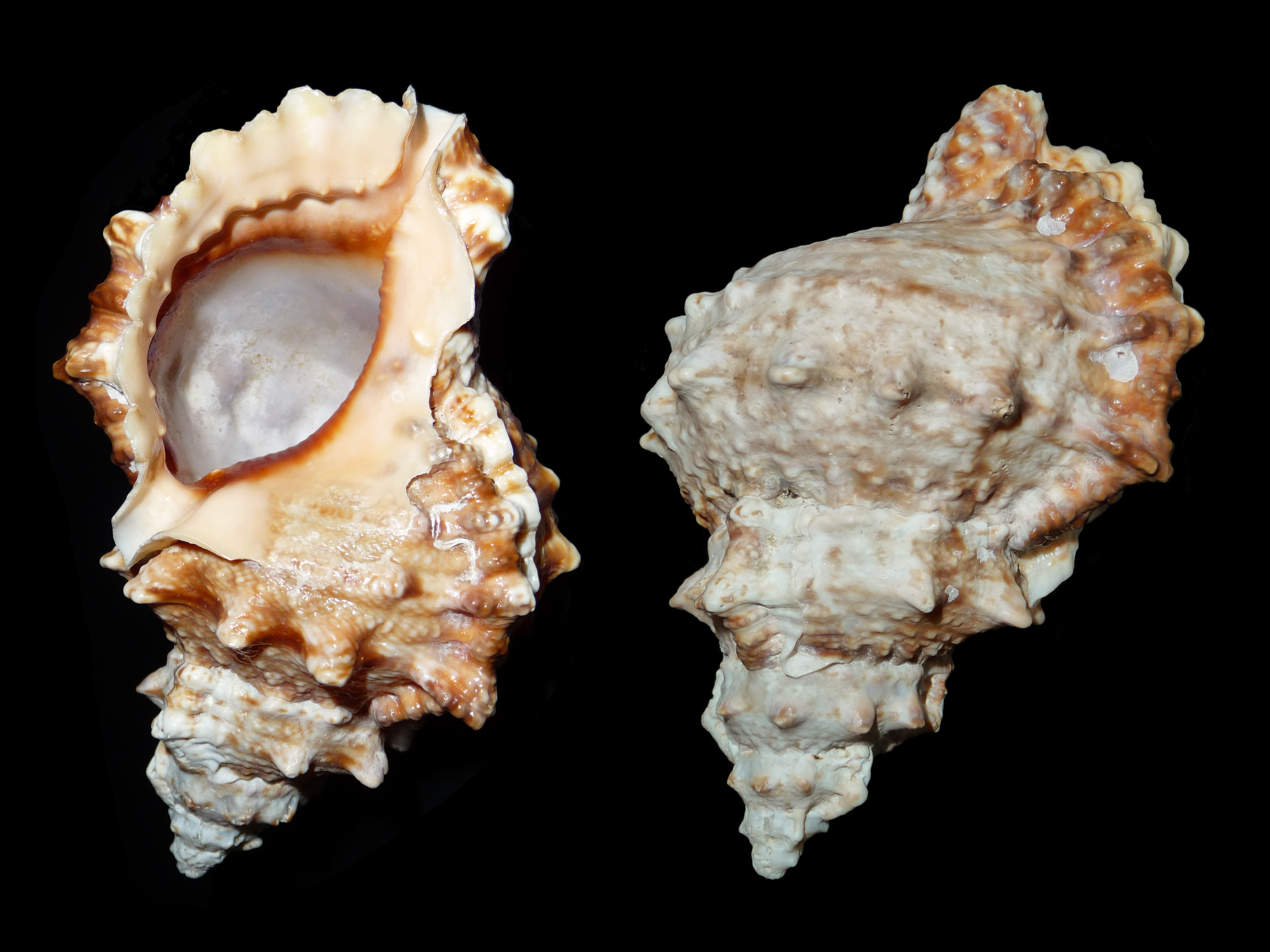
- shell of Tutufa bufo

Scientific classification
- Kingdom: Animalia
- Phylum: Mollusca
- Class: Gastropoda
- Subclass: Caenogastropoda
- Order: Littorinimorpha
- Family: Bursidae
- Genus: Tutufa
- Species: T. bufo

Binomial name
- Tutufa bufo (Röding, 1798)

Synonyms
- Bursa (Tutufa) rubeta var. lissostoma E.A. Smith, 1914; Ranella lampas Iwakawa, 1900; Tritonium bufo Röding, 1798; Tutufa (Tutufa) lissostoma Smith, E.A., 1914; Tutufa robusta Cossignani, 2009

= Tutufa bufo =

Species of gastropod

Tutufa bufo, common name the red-mouth frog shell, is a species of sea snail, a marine gastropod mollusk in the family Bursidae, the frog shells.

== Description ==
The size of an adult shell varies between 50 mm and 240 mm.

== Distribution ==
This marine species is distributed in the Indo-West Pacific: Rottnest Island, Coffs Harbour, and Rarawa Beach.
