= Tutufa oyamai =

Scientific classification
- Kingdom: Animalia
- Phylum: Mollusca
- Class: Gastropoda
- Subclass: Caenogastropoda
- Order: Littorinimorpha
- Family: Bursidae
- Genus: Tutufa
- Species: T. oyamai

Binomial name
- Tutufa oyamai (Habe, 1973)

Synonyms
- Tutufa oyamai Habe, 1973

Species of gastropod

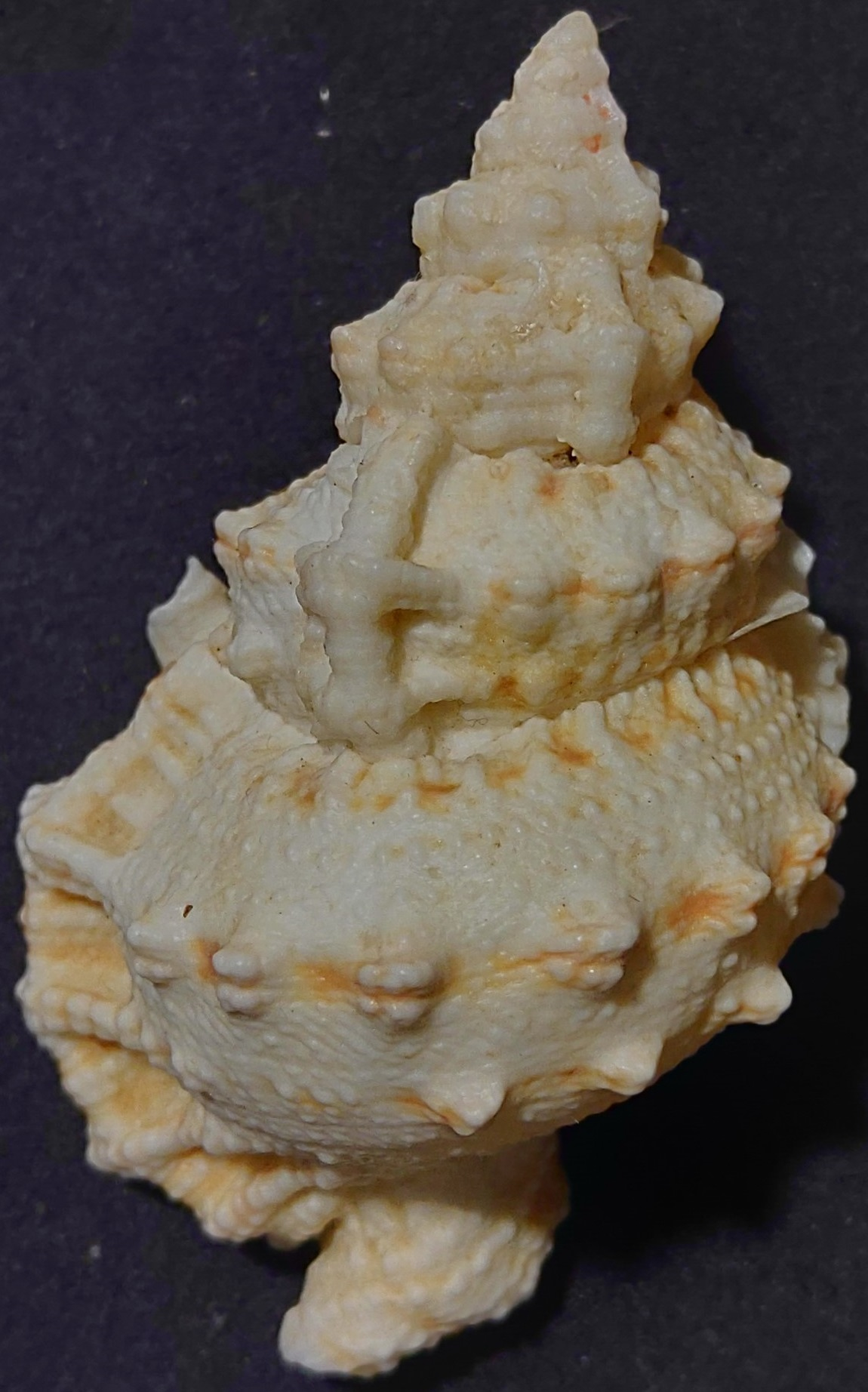

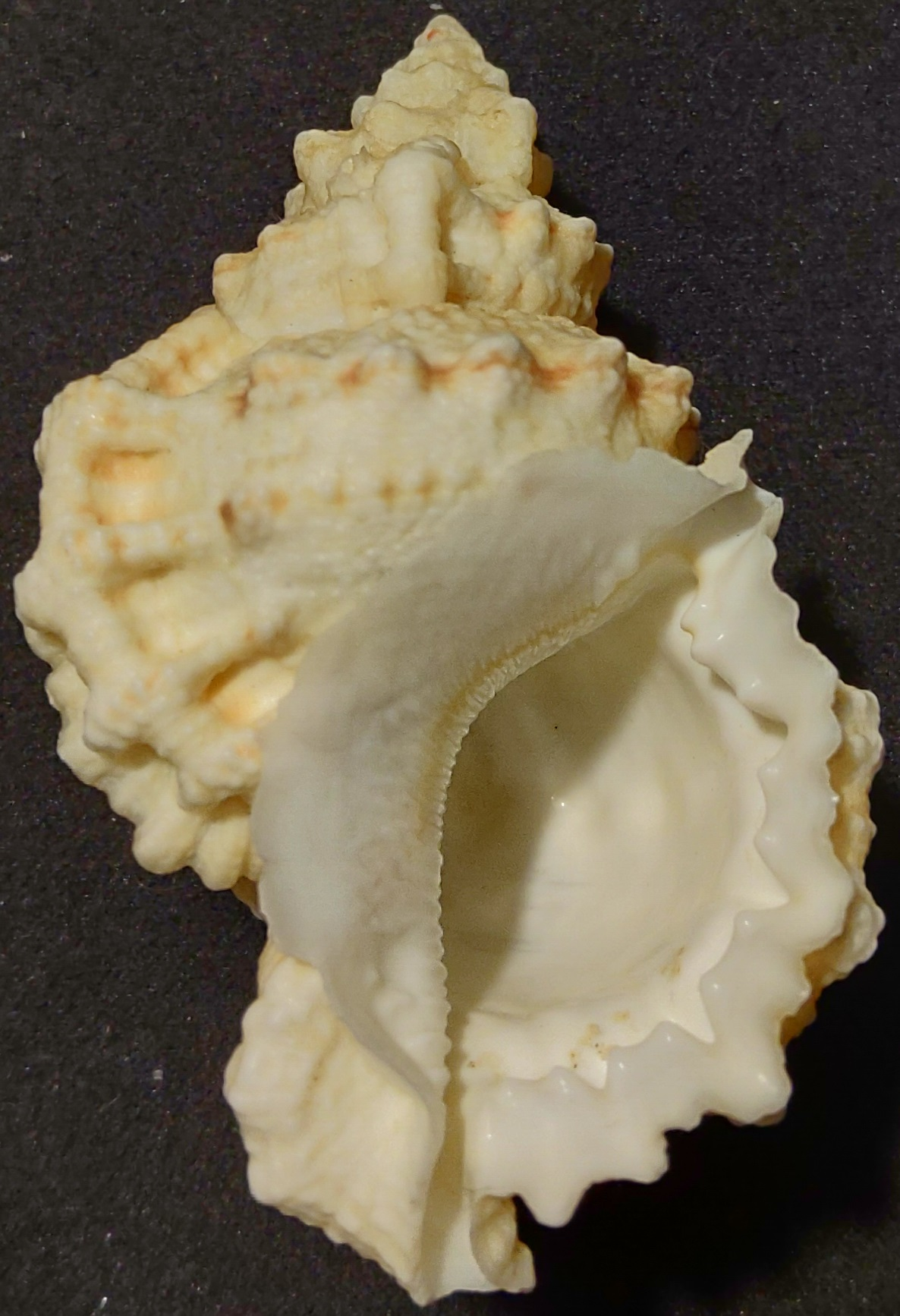

Tutufa oyamai is a species of sea snail, a marine gastropod mollusk in the family Bursidae, the frog shells.
