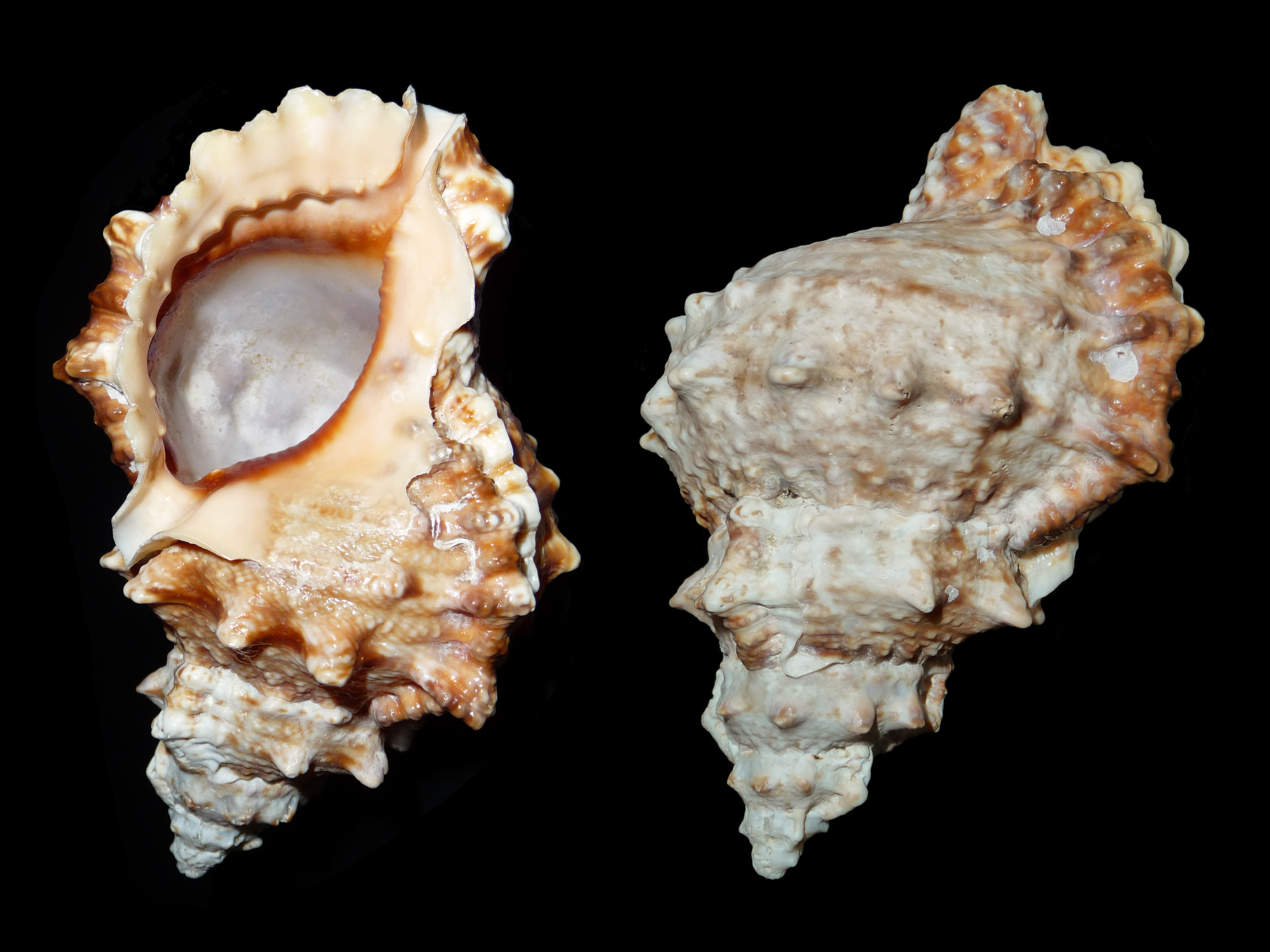
- Two views of a shell of Tutufa bufo
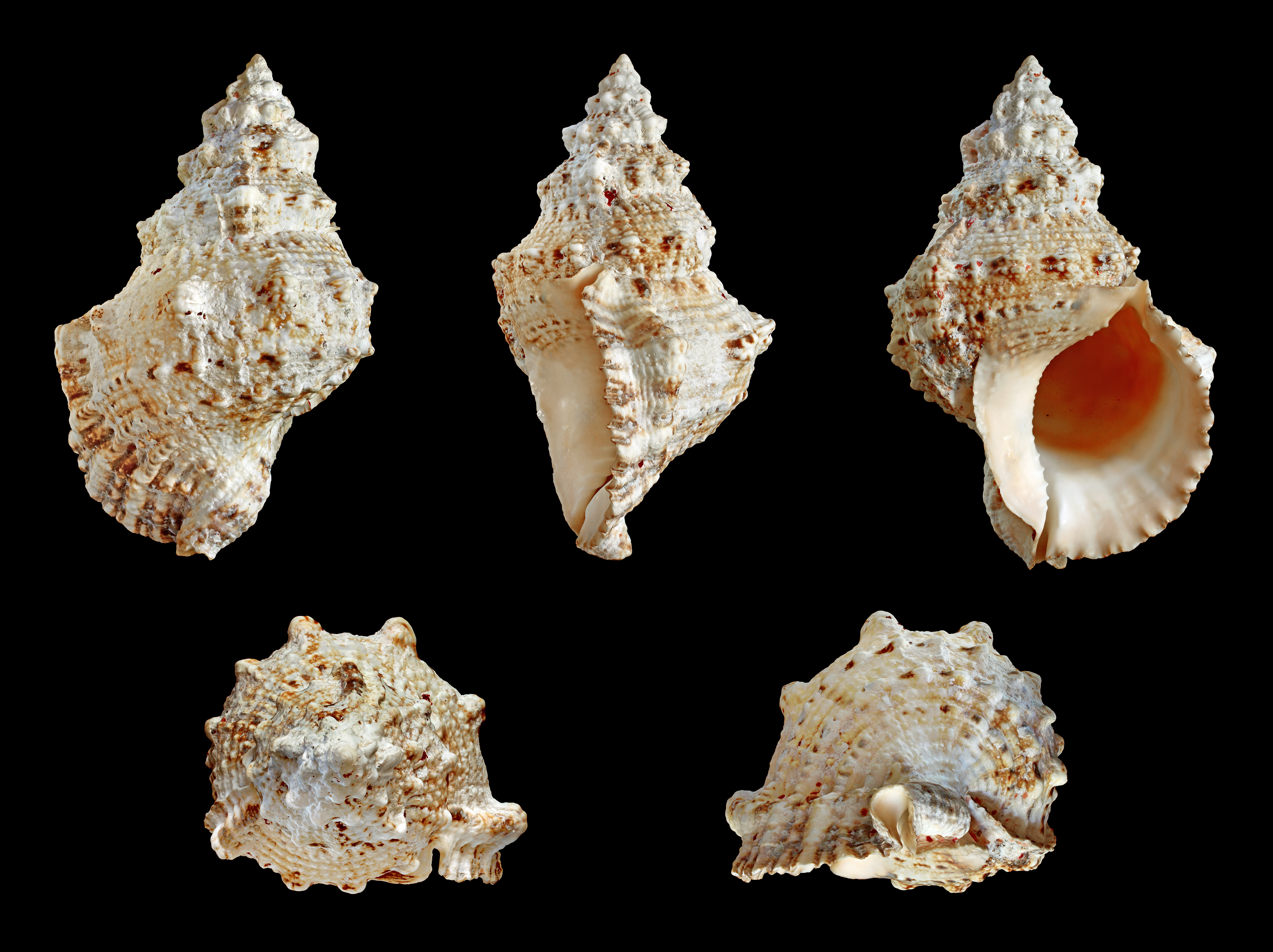
- Five views of a shell of Tutufa bubo

Scientific classification
- Kingdom: Animalia
- Phylum: Mollusca
- Class: Gastropoda
- Subclass: Caenogastropoda
- Order: Littorinimorpha
- Superfamily: Tonnoidea
- Family: Bursidae
- Genus: Tutufa; Jousseaume, 1881

Type species
- Murex rana bubo Linnaeus, 1758

Synonyms
- Bursa (Lampas) Schumacher, 1817; Bursa (Tutufa) Jousseaume, 1881; Lampas Schumacher, 1817 (invalid: junior homonym of Lampas Montfort, 1808 [Foraminifera]; Tutufella is a replacement name); Tutufa (Tutufa) Jousseaume, 1881 · alternate representation; Tutufa (Tutufella) Beu, 1981 · alternate representation; Tutufella Beu, 1981 (Replacement name for Lampas' Montfort, 1808 [Foraminifera]; Tutufella is a replacement name)

= Tutufa =

Genus of gastropods

Tutufa is a genus of sea snails, marine gastropod mollusks in the family Bursidae, the frog shells. They have an Indo-West Pacific distribution.

== Description ==
Tutufa includes the largest bursids, with the largest species, Tutufa bardeyi, attaining a shell height of up to 420 mm, Tutufa bubo attaining a shell height of up to 300 mm, and Tutufa tenuigranosa attaining similar sizes to T. bubo. Other species, such as Tutufa bufo and Tutufa rubeta, are smaller. Unlike most bursids, in which the varices are separated by 180° and form a pair of rows on opposite sides of the shell, the varices of Tutufa are separated by 240° and do not line up neatly, resembling cymatiids in this respect. However, like all bursids and unlike cymatiids, Tutufa has an anal canal. The shell is turreted. The whorls are nodose. The siphonal canal is very short and recurved.

== Taxonomy ==
Historically, the various species of Tutufa were considered to belong to one variable species. This species was known as Bursa lampas, Ranella lampas, or Triton lampas, using a species name coined by Carl Linnaeus that is now considered to apply to the triton shell Charonia lampas. Linnaeus's original description of the species, which he called Murex lampas, referenced illustrations of shells of both taxa, but he stated that the species inhabited the Mediterranean, matching the range of Charonia lampas but not any of the species of Tutufa. In 1914, Edgar Albert Smith determined that the correct application of the name lampas was for the Mediterranean triton shell, not the bursid species, and recognized several varieties of the species that he called Bursa (Tutufa) rubeta. The genus name Tutufa had originally been proposed in 1881 by Jousseaume with Murex lampas as the type species, but in 1977 the International Commission on Zoological Nomenclature ruled that since Jousseaume presumably meant the bursid species incorrectly known as Bursa lampas at the time, the type species of Tutufa should be Murex rana bubo, now known as Tutufa bubo, to match Jousseaume's intention.

=== Species ===
Species within the genus Tutufa include:

- Tutufa bardeyi (Jousseaume, 1881)
- Tutufa boholica Beu, 1987
- Tutufa bubo (Linnaeus, 1758)
- Tutufa bufo (Röding, 1798)
- Tutufa hitoshiikedai Thach, 2023
- Tutufa kevini Thach, 2023
- Tutufa lucsegersi Thach, 2023
- Tutufa nigrita Mühlhäusser & Blöcher, 1979
- Tutufa oyamai (Habe, 1973)
- Tutufa robusta T. Cossignani, 2009
- Tutufa rubeta (Linnaeus, 1758)
- Tutufa tenuigranosa (E.A. Smith, 1914)
- Tutufa truongi Thach, 2023
