= Tutufa bardeyi =

Scientific classification
- Kingdom: Animalia
- Phylum: Mollusca
- Class: Gastropoda
- Subclass: Caenogastropoda
- Order: Littorinimorpha
- Family: Bursidae
- Genus: Tutufa
- Species: T. bardeyi

Binomial name
- Tutufa bardeyi (Jousseaume, 1881)

Synonyms
- Bursa (Tutufa) rubeta var. gigantea E.A. Smith, 1914; Bursa rubeta var. gigantea E.A. Smith, 1914; Lampas bardeyi Jousseaume, 1881

Species of gastropod

Tutufa bardeyi is a species of sea snail, a marine gastropod mollusk in the family Bursidae, the frog shells.

== Description ==
The length of the shell varies between 75 mm and 430 mm. This quite rare shell is the largest known in Bursidae species. It is thick and heavy, with a deeply notched siphonal canal at the end of a wide whitish or slightly yellowish or pinkish aperture. The outer lip is relatively thin, with a wavy edge. The surface color may be almost white or pale brown and shows broad, prominent ribs, closely adjacent to each other.

== Distribution ==
This marine species occurs in the Gulf of Aden, Somalia, Kenya and Tanzania.
