= Occlusion =

Occlusion may refer to:

== Health and fitness ==
- Occlusion (dentistry), the manner in which the upper and lower teeth come together when the mouth is closed
- Occlusion miliaria, a skin condition
- Occlusive dressing, an air- and water-tight trauma dressing used in first aid
- Vascular occlusion, blockage of a blood vessel
  - Vascular occlusion training, or blood flow restriction training, a technique done by some bodybuilders

== Other uses ==
- Ambient occlusion, a shading method used in 3D computer graphics
- Occluded front, part of cyclone formation
- Occlusion culling, or hidden surface determination, a 3D computer graphics process
- Occlusion effect, an audio phenomenon
- Occlusive, in phonetics

== See also ==
- Occlusion training (disambiguation)
- Occultation, when one object is hidden by another object that passes between it and the observer
- Occlusive (disambiguation)
