= Occlusion training =

Occlusion training may refer to:

- Alternating occlusion training, in vision therapy, using shutter goggles that feature a rapid flicker rate
- Eyepatch, therapeutic use to alternate between eyes
- BFR training, an exercise method involving vasculature compression
- Duct tape occlusion therapy, a method of treating warts

== See also ==
- Occlusion (disambiguation)
