= BFRT =

BFRT may refer to:

- Bruce Freeman Rail Trail in Massachusetts
- Blood flow restriction training
