= Occlusive (disambiguation) =

In phonetics, an occlusive is a consonant in which the vocal tract is closed or blocked off.

Occlusive may also refer to:

- Occlusive, a type of moisturizer

== See also ==
- Occlusion (disambiguation)
- Occlusive dressing
- Non-occlusive disease
- Occlusive pessary
- Occlusive vascular disease
