= Seashell =

Hard, protective outer layers created by an animal that lives in the sea

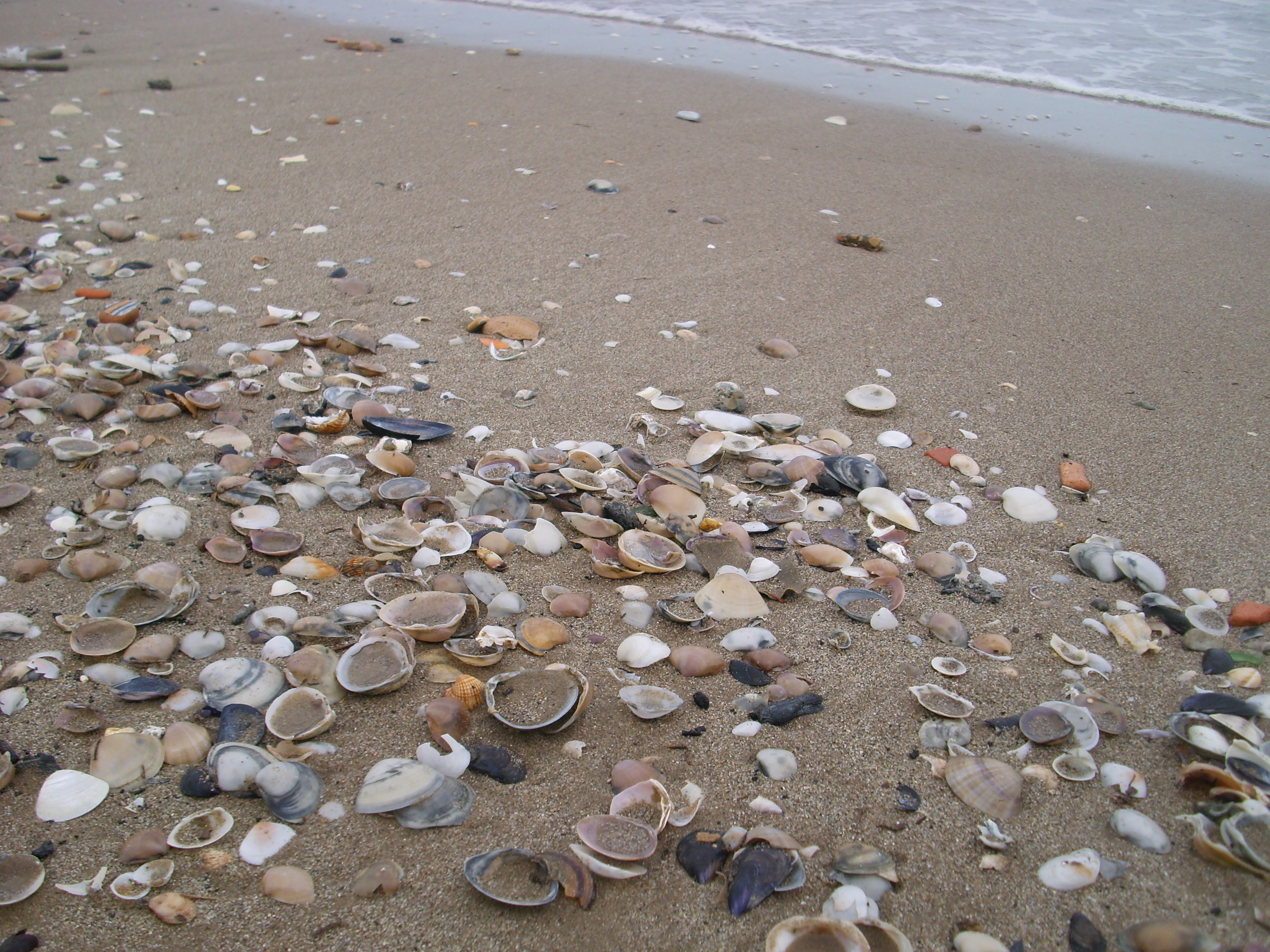
Seashells washed up on the beach in Valencia, Spain; nearly all are single valves of bivalve mollusks, mostly of Mactra corallina

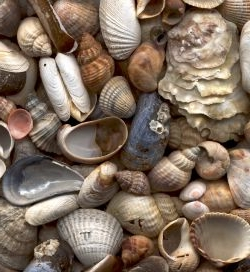
Hand-picked molluscan seashells (bivalves and gastropods) from the beach at Clacton on Sea in England

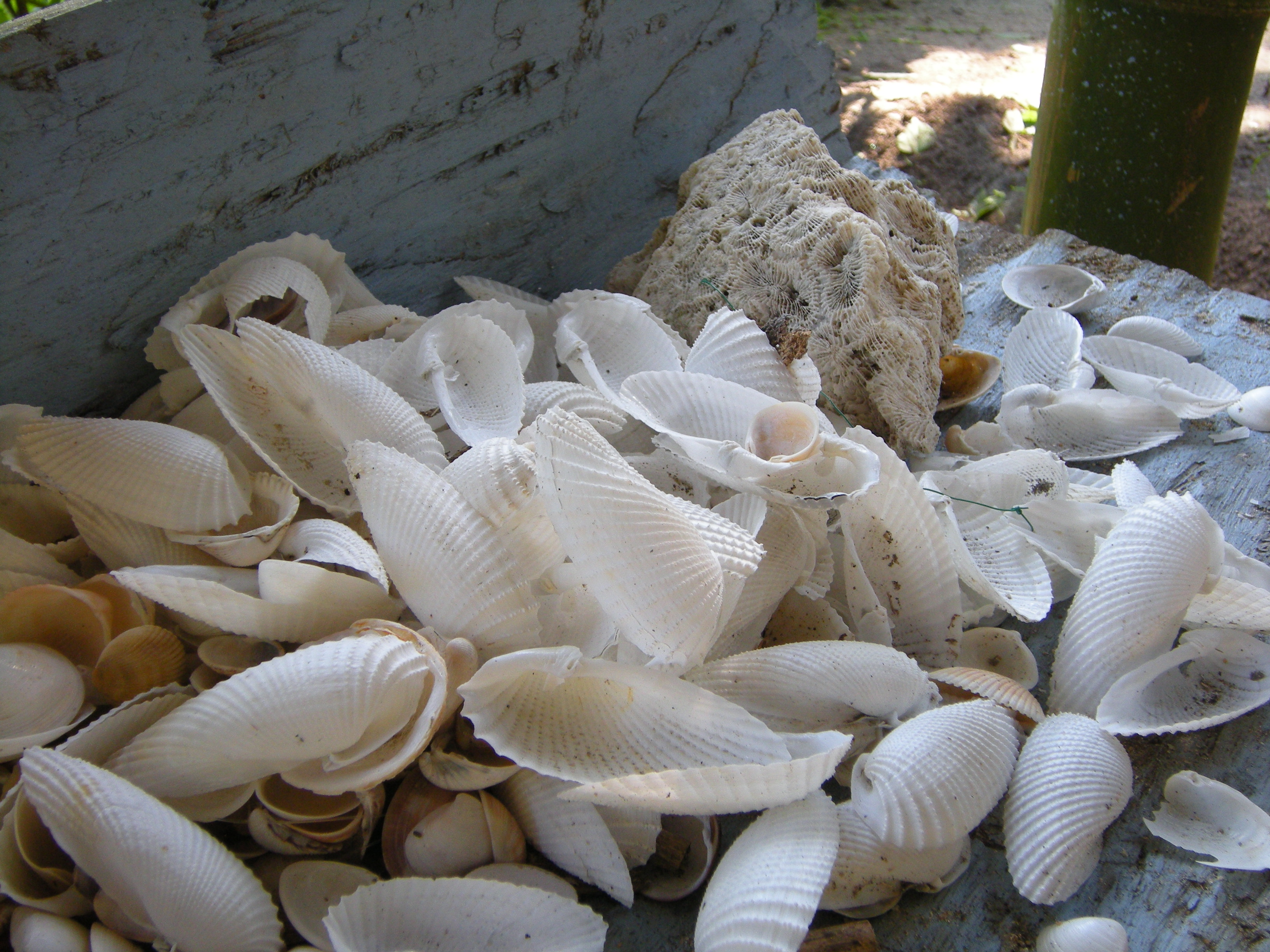
A group of seashells, mostly bivalves in the family Pholadidae

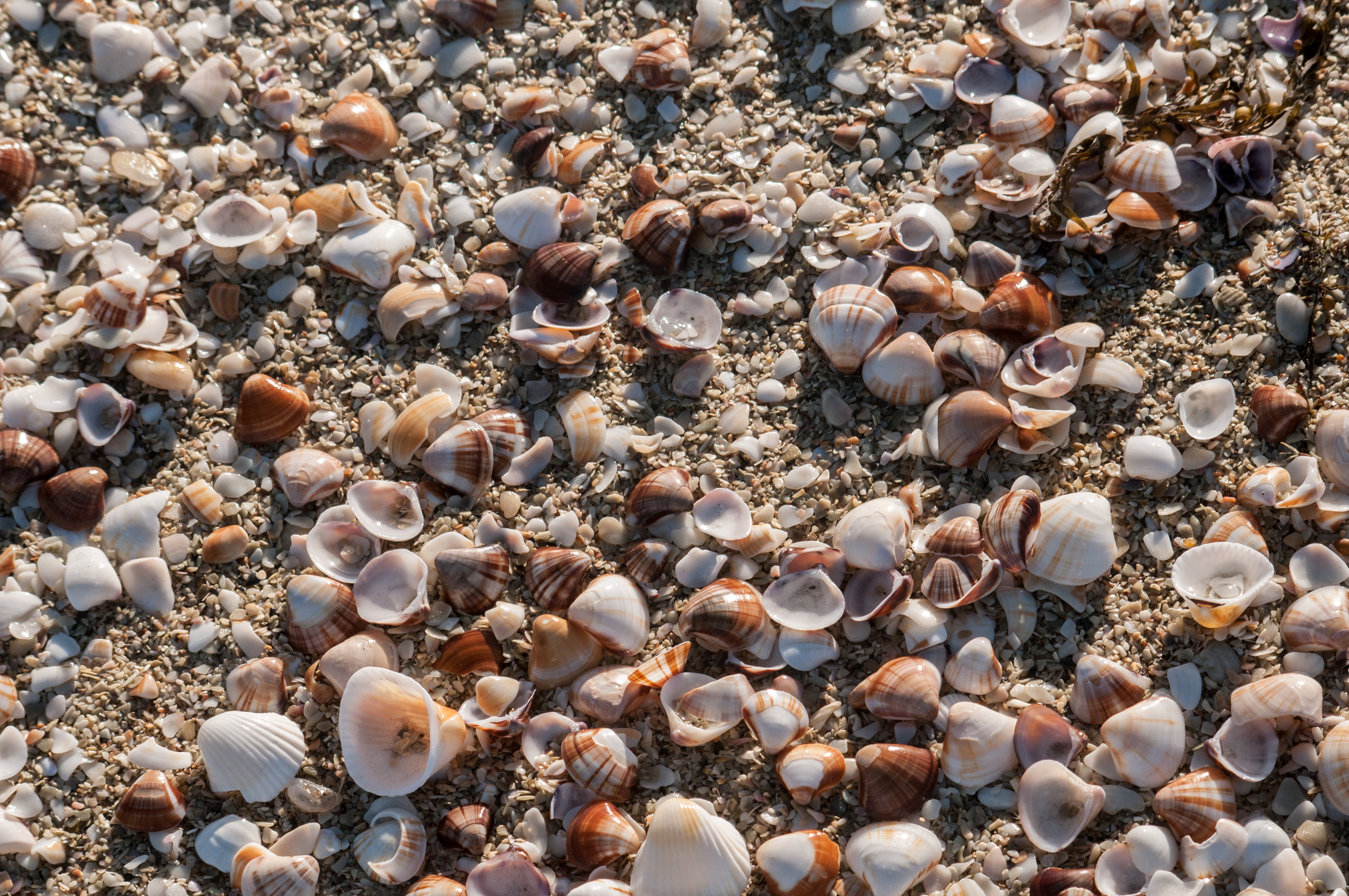
Mixed shells on a beach in Venezuela

Hermit crabs inhabiting marine gastropod shells that lived in the Persian Gulf

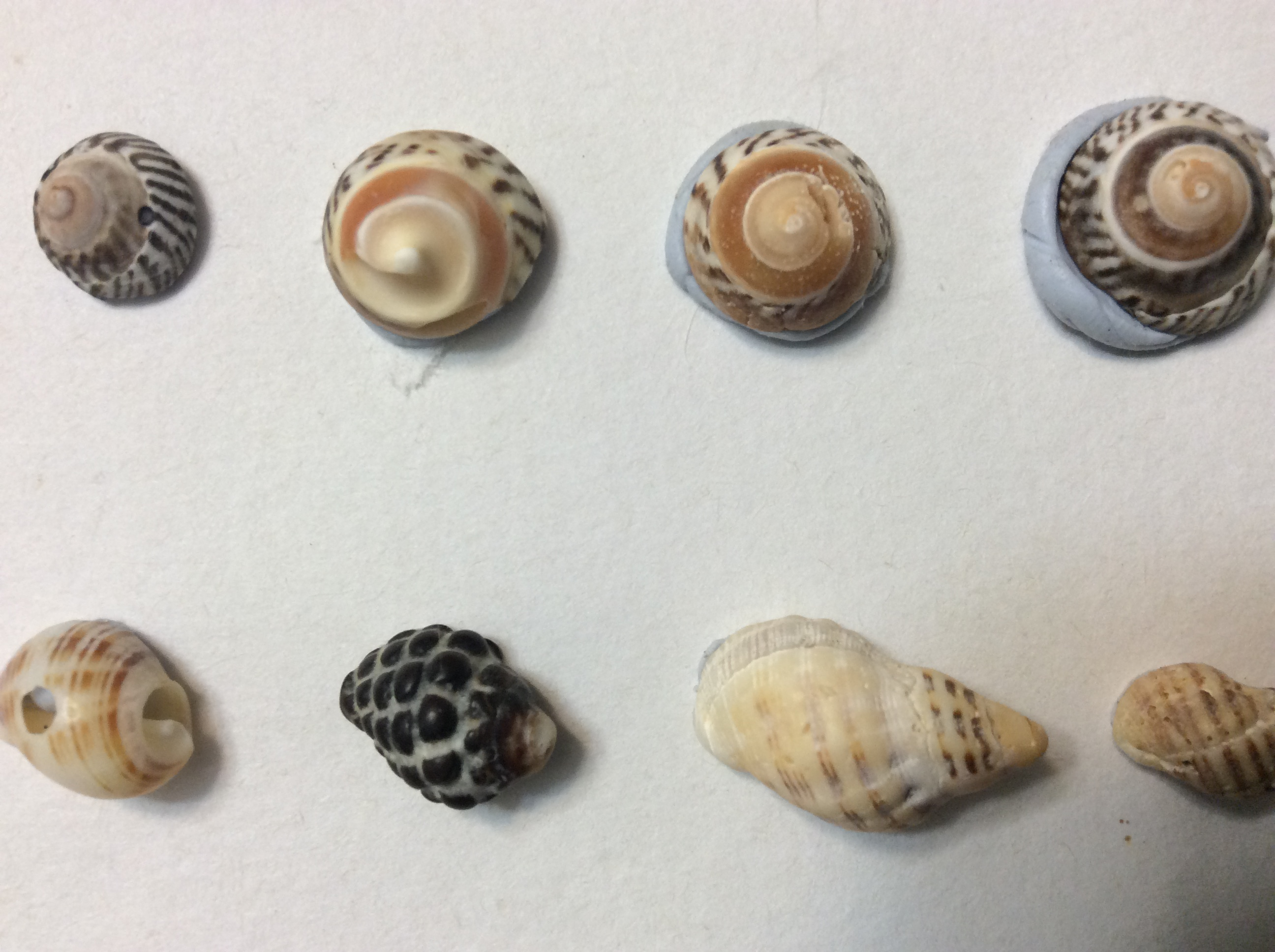
A group of beach-worn sea snail shells that vary in size, form and pattern combination.

A seashell (or sea shell), also known simply as a shell, is a hard, protective outer layer usually created by an animal or organism that lives in the sea. Most seashells are made by mollusks, such as snails, clams, and oysters to protect their soft insides. Empty seashells are often found washed up on beaches by beachcombers. The shells are empty because the animal has died and the soft parts have decomposed or been eaten by another organism.

A seashell is usually the exoskeleton of an invertebrate (an animal without a backbone), and is typically composed of calcium carbonate and partially chitin. Most shells that are found on beaches are the shells of marine mollusks, partly because these shells are usually made of calcium carbonate, and endure better than shells made of chitin.

Apart from mollusk shells, other shells that can be found on beaches are those of barnacles, horseshoe crabs and brachiopods. Marine annelid worms in the family Serpulidae create shells which are tubes made of calcium carbonate cemented onto other surfaces. The shells of sea urchins are called "tests", and the moulted shells of crabs and lobsters are exuviae. While most seashells are external, some cephalopods have internal shells.

Seashells have been used by humans for many different purposes throughout history and prehistory. However, seashells are not the only kind of shells; in various habitats, there are shells from freshwater animals such as freshwater mussels and freshwater snails, and shells of land snails.

== Terminology ==
When the word "seashells" refers only to the shells of marine mollusks, then studying seashells is part of conchology. Conchologists and amateur researchers are in general careful not to disturb living populations and habitats. Most responsible collectors do not over-collect or otherwise disturb ecosystems even if they capture few live specimens.

The study of mollusks (including their shells) is known as malacology; a person who studies mollusks is known as a malacologist.

== Occurrence ==
Seashells are commonly found in beach drift, which is natural detritus deposited along strandlines on beaches by the waves and the tides. Shells are very often washed up onto a beach empty and clean, the animal having already died.

Empty seashells are often picked up by beachcombers. However, the majority of seashells which are offered for sale commercially have been collected alive (often in bulk) and then killed and cleaned, specifically for the commercial trade. This type of large-scale exploitation can sometimes have a strong negative impact on local ecosystems, and sometimes can significantly reduce the distribution of rare species.

== Shell synthesis ==
Seashells are created by the mollusks that use them for protection. Mollusks have an outside layer of tissues on their bodies – the mantle – which creates the shell material and which connects the shell to the mollusk. The specialized cells in the mantle form the shell using different minerals and proteins. The proteins are then used to create the framework that supports the growing shell. Calcium carbonate is the main compound of shell structure, aiding in adhesion.

== Molluscan seashells ==
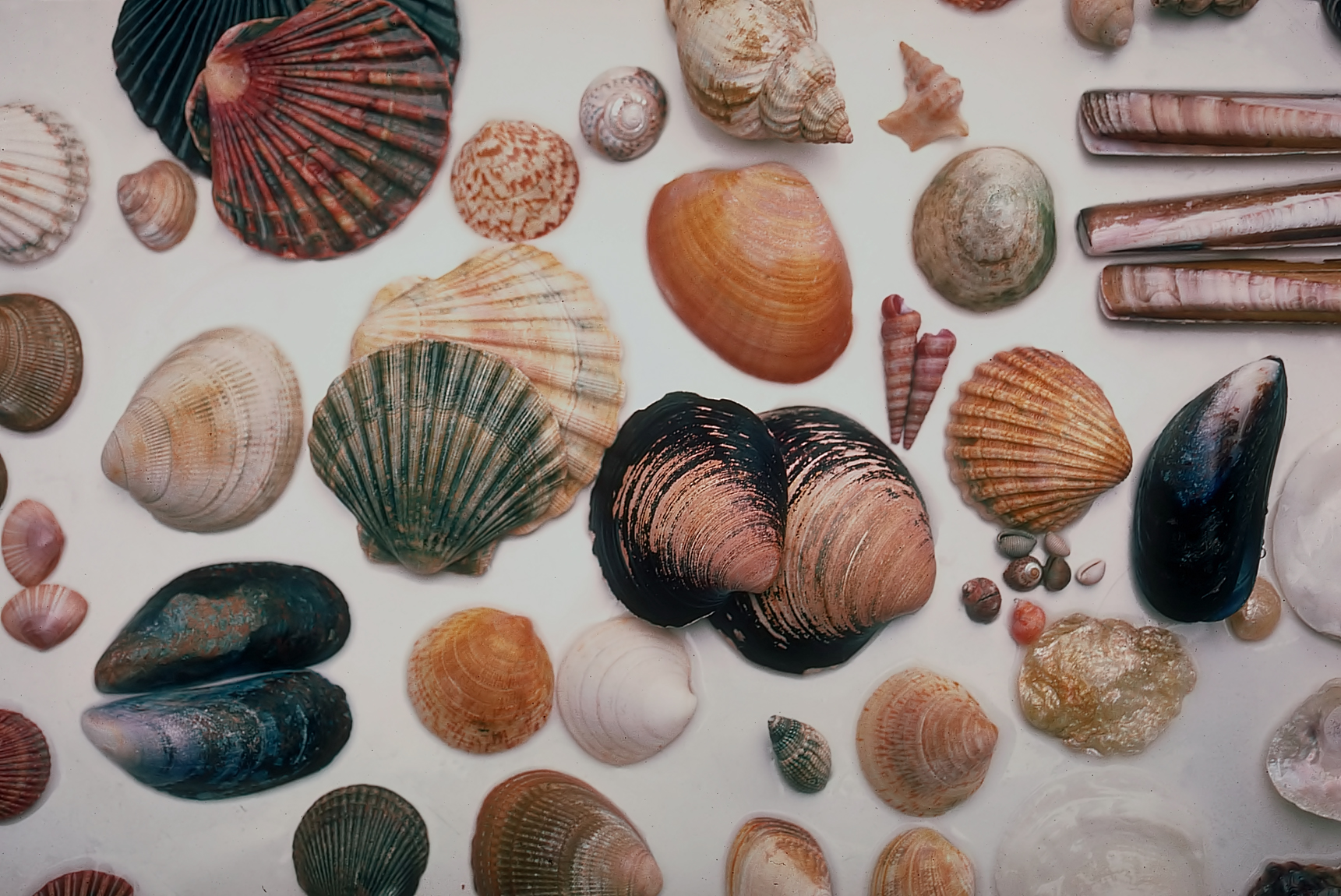
Seashells hand-picked from beach drift in North Wales at Shell Island near Harlech Castle, Wales, bivalves and gastropods, March/April 1985

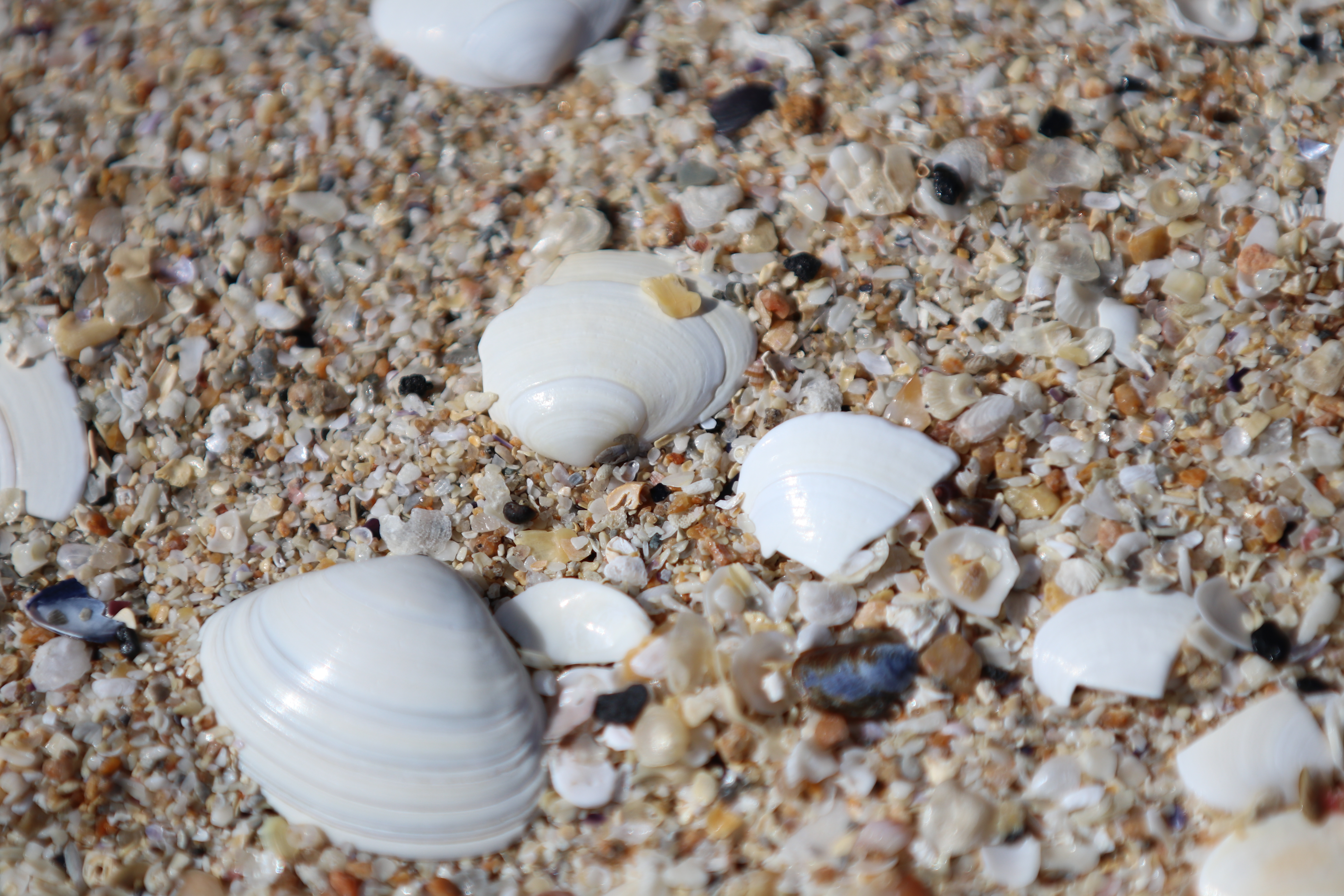
Shells on the seashore

The word seashell is often used to mean only the shell of a marine mollusk. Marine mollusk shells that are familiar to beachcombers and thus most likely to be called "seashells" are the shells of marine species of bivalves (or clams), gastropods (or snails), scaphopods (or tusk shells), polyplacophorans (or chitons), and cephalopods (such as nautilus and spirula). These shells are very often the most commonly encountered, both in the wild, and for sale as decorative objects.

Marine species of gastropods and bivalves are more numerous than land and freshwater species, and the shells are often larger and more robust. The shells of marine species also often have more sculpture and more color, although this is by no means always the case.

In the tropical and sub-tropical areas of the planet, there are far more species of colorful, large, shallow water shelled marine mollusks than there are in the temperate zones and the regions closer to the poles.

Although there are a number of species of shelled mollusks that are quite large, there are vast numbers of extremely small species too, see micromollusks.

Not all mollusks are marine. There are numerous land and freshwater mollusks, see for example snail and freshwater bivalves. In addition, not all mollusks have an external shell: some mollusks such as some cephalopods (squid and octopuses) have an internal shell, and many mollusks have no shell, see for example slug and nudibranch.

=== Bivalves ===
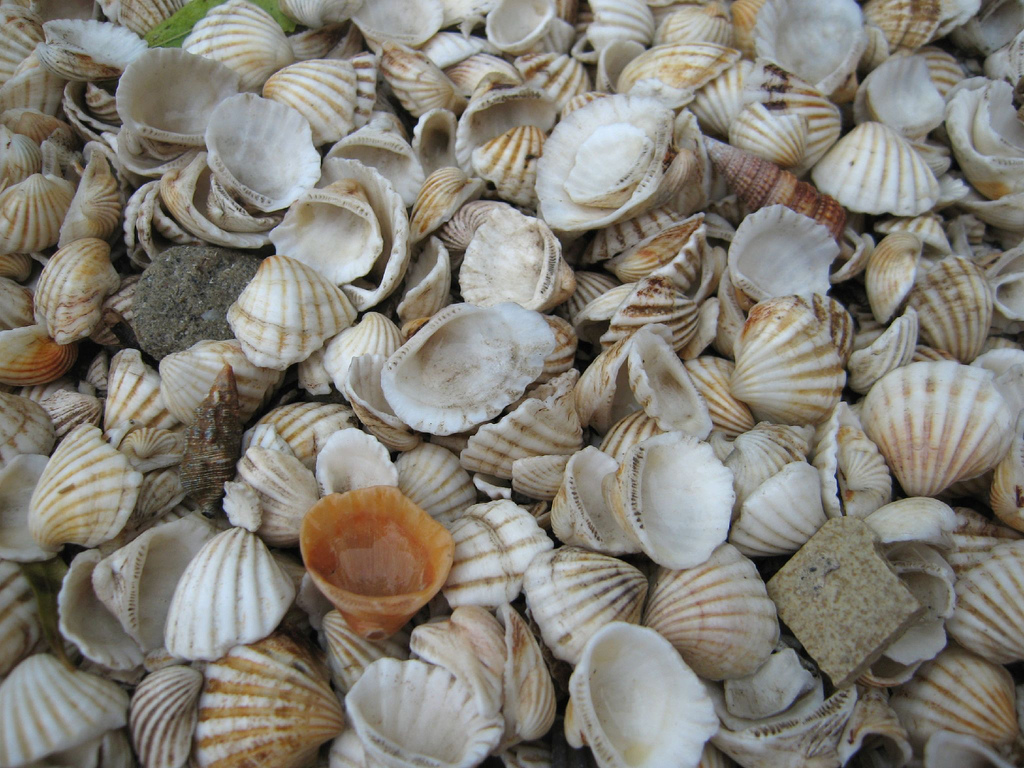
Single valves of the bivalve Senilia senilis, plus two gastropods, washed up on the beach at Fadiouth, Senegal

Bivalves are often the most common seashells that wash up on large sandy beaches or in sheltered lagoons. They can sometimes be extremely numerous. Very often the two valves become separated.

There are more than 15,000 species of bivalves that live in both marine and freshwater. Examples of bivalves are clams, scallops, mussels, and oysters. The majority of bivalves consist of two identical shells that are held together by a flexible hinge. The animal's body is held protectively inside these two shells. Bivalves that do not have two shells either have one shell or they lack a shell altogether. The shells are made of calcium carbonate and are formed in layers by secretions from the mantle. Bivalves, also known as pelecypods, are mostly filter feeders; through their gills, they draw in water, in which is trapped tiny food particles. Some bivalves have eyes and an open circulatory system. Bivalves are used all over the world as food and as a source of pearls. The larvae of some freshwater mussels can be dangerous to fish and can bore through wood.

Shell Beach, Western Australia, is a beach which is entirely made up of the shells of the cockle Fragum erugatum.

=== Gastropods ===
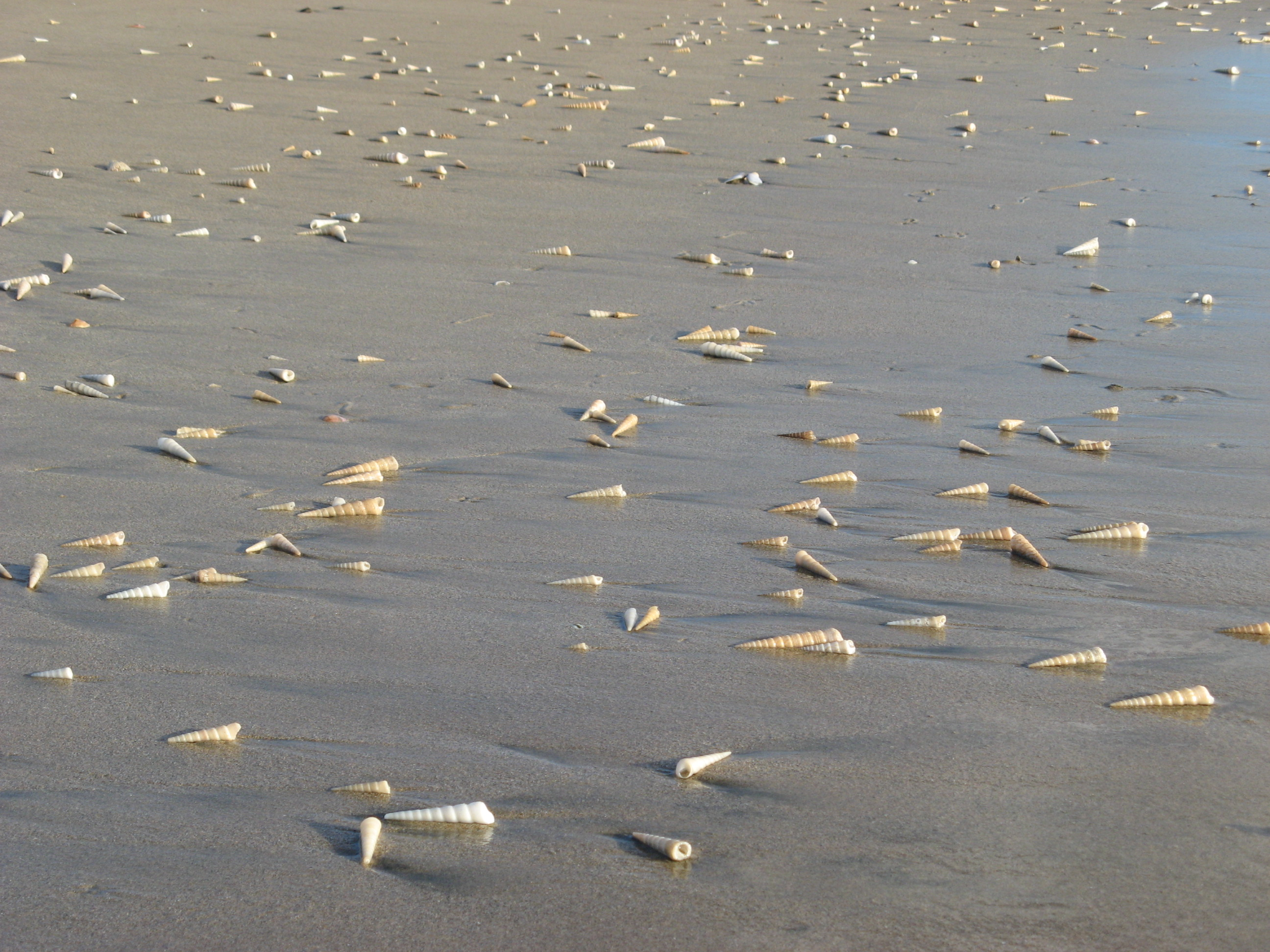
Numerous Turritella gastropod shells washed up on a beach at Playa Grande, Costa Rica

Certain species of gastropod seashells (the shells of sea snails) can sometimes be common, washed up on sandy beaches, and also on beaches that are surrounded by rocky marine habitat.

There are more than 65,000 species of gastropods that live in marine, freshwater, and terrestrial environments. Examples of gastropods include snails, slugs, whelks, limpets, and abalones. Most gastropods have a single coiled shell, which is made of calcium carbonate and is secreted in layers by the mantle, although some species have reduced shells or no shell at all. A key feature of gastropods is their muscular foot, which they use for crawling, burrowing, or swimming, and their head typically bears tentacles and eyes. Many gastropods feed using a radula, a ribbon-like structure with tiny teeth that scrape, cut, or drill food, though some species filter feed or prey on other animals. Gastropods have a wide variety of reproductive strategies and undergo a developmental process known as torsion, which twists the body and internal organs. They are used worldwide as a source of food, and some species produce valuable materials such as mother-of-pearl. Certain marine gastropods can be harmful to other organisms; for example, cone snails possess venomous harpoons capable of paralyzing prey.

=== Polyplacophorans ===
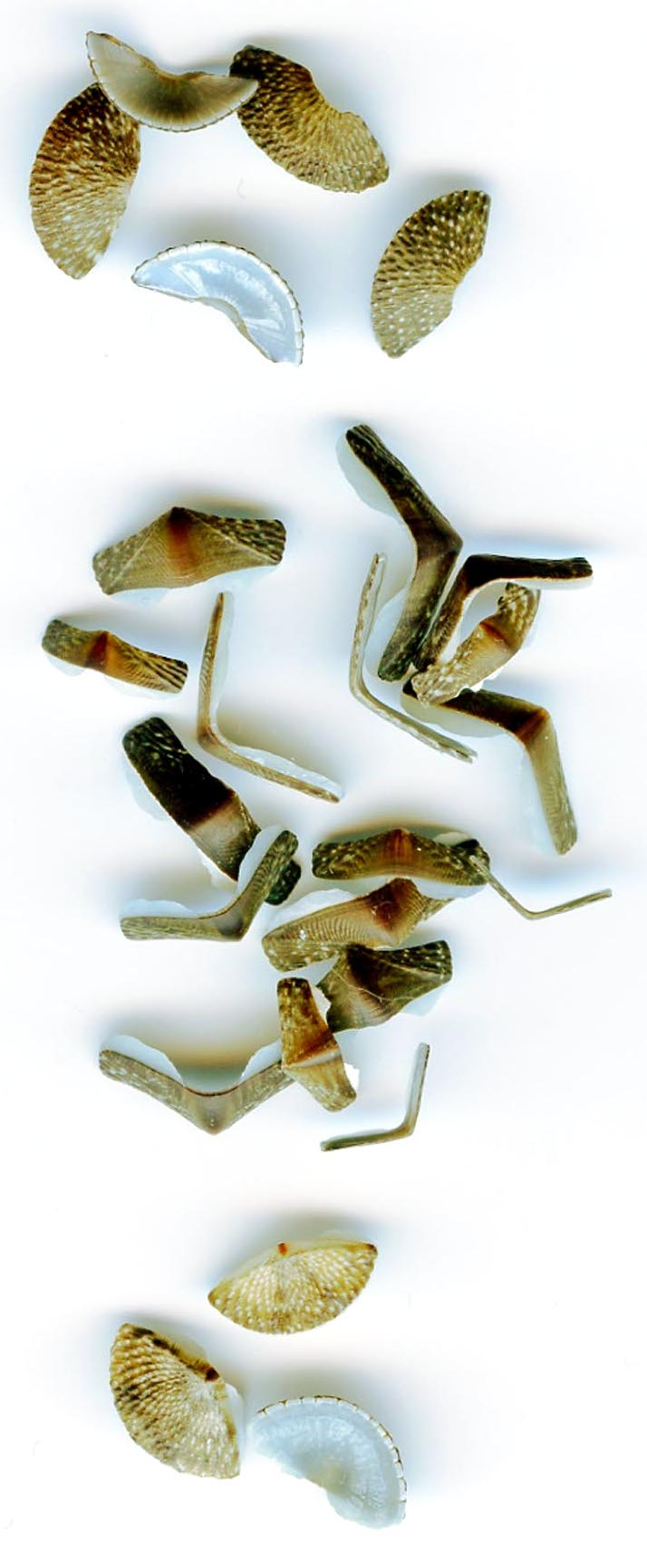
Loose valves or plates from Chiton tuberculatus from the beachdrift on the southeast coast of Nevis, West Indies

Chiton plates or valves often wash up on beaches in rocky areas where chitons are common. Chiton shells, which are composed of eight separate plates and a girdle, usually come apart not long after death, so they are almost always found as disarticulated plates. Plates from larger species of chitons are sometimes known as "butterfly shells" because of their shape.

=== Cephalopods ===
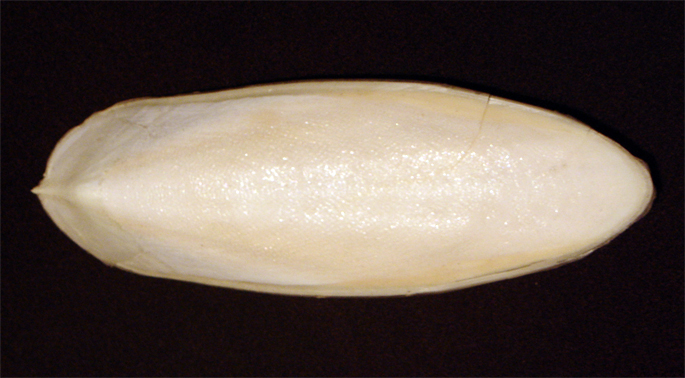
Cuttlebone from a Sepia sp.

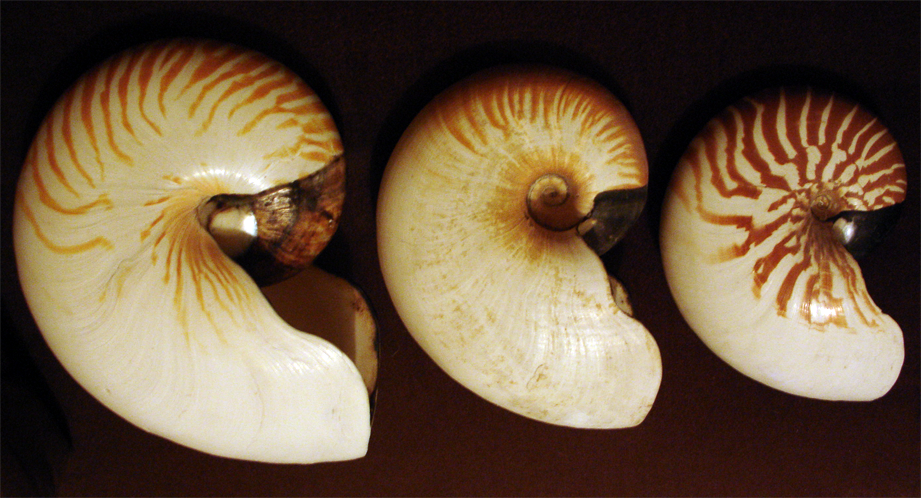
Shells of 3 species of Nautilus

Only a few species of cephalopods have shells (either internal or external) that are sometimes found washed up on beaches.

Some cephalopods such as Sepia, the cuttlefish, have a large internal shell, the cuttlefish bone, and this often washes up on beaches in parts of the world where cuttlefish are common.

Spirula spirula is a deep water squid-like cephalopod. It has an internal shell which is small (about 1 in or 24 mm) but very light and buoyant. This chambered shell floats very well and therefore washes up easily and is familiar to beachcombers in the tropics.

Nautilus is the only genus of cephalopod that has a well-developed external shell. Females of the cephalopod genus Argonauta create a papery egg case which sometimes washes up on tropical beaches and is referred to as a "paper nautilus".

The largest group of shelled cephalopods, the ammonites, are extinct, but their shells are very common in certain areas as fossils.

=== Molluscan seashells used by other animals ===
Empty molluscan seashells are a sturdy, and usually readily available, "free" resource which is often easily found on beaches, in the intertidal zone, and in the shallow subtidal zone. As such they are sometimes used second-hand by animals other than humans for various purposes, including for protection (as in hermit crabs) and for construction.

==== Mollusks ====
- Carrier shells in the family Xenophoridae are marine shelled gastropods, fairly large sea snails. Most species of xenophorids cement a series of objects to the rim of their shells as they grow. These objects are sometimes small pebbles or other hard detritus. Very often shells of bivalves or smaller gastropods are used, depending on what is available on the particular substrate where the snail itself lives. It is not clear whether these shell attachments serve as camouflage, or whether they are intended to help prevent the shell sinking into a soft substrate.

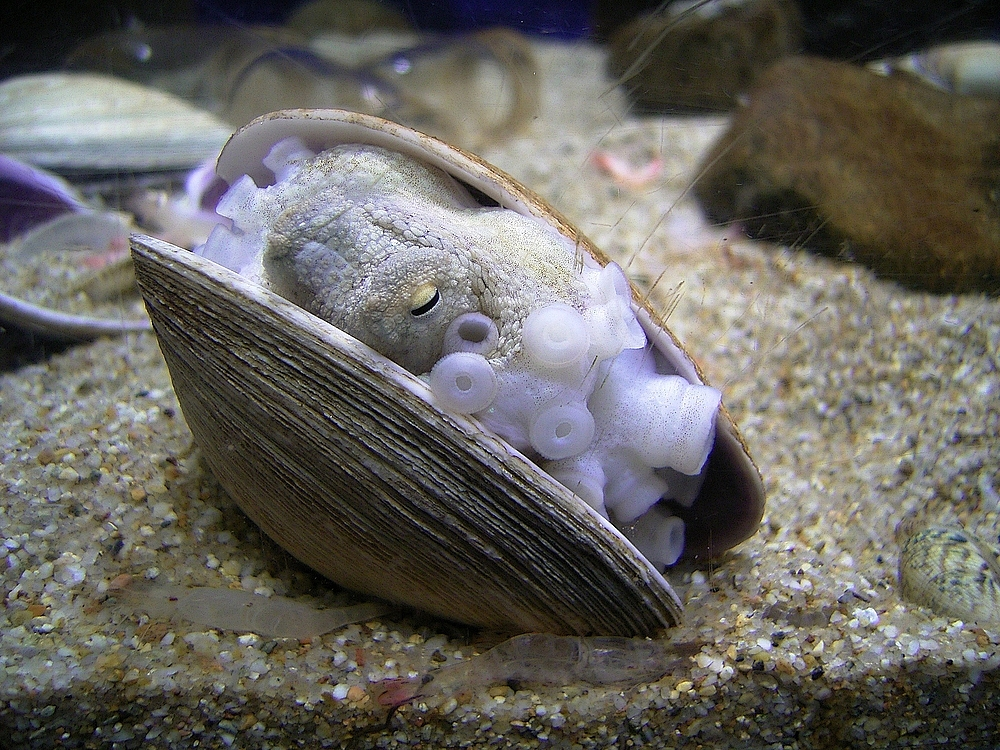
An ocellated (spotted) octopus using a clamshell as a shelter

- Small octopuses sometimes use an empty shell as a sort of cave to hide in, or hold seashells around themselves as a form of protection like a temporary fortress.

==== Invertebrates ====
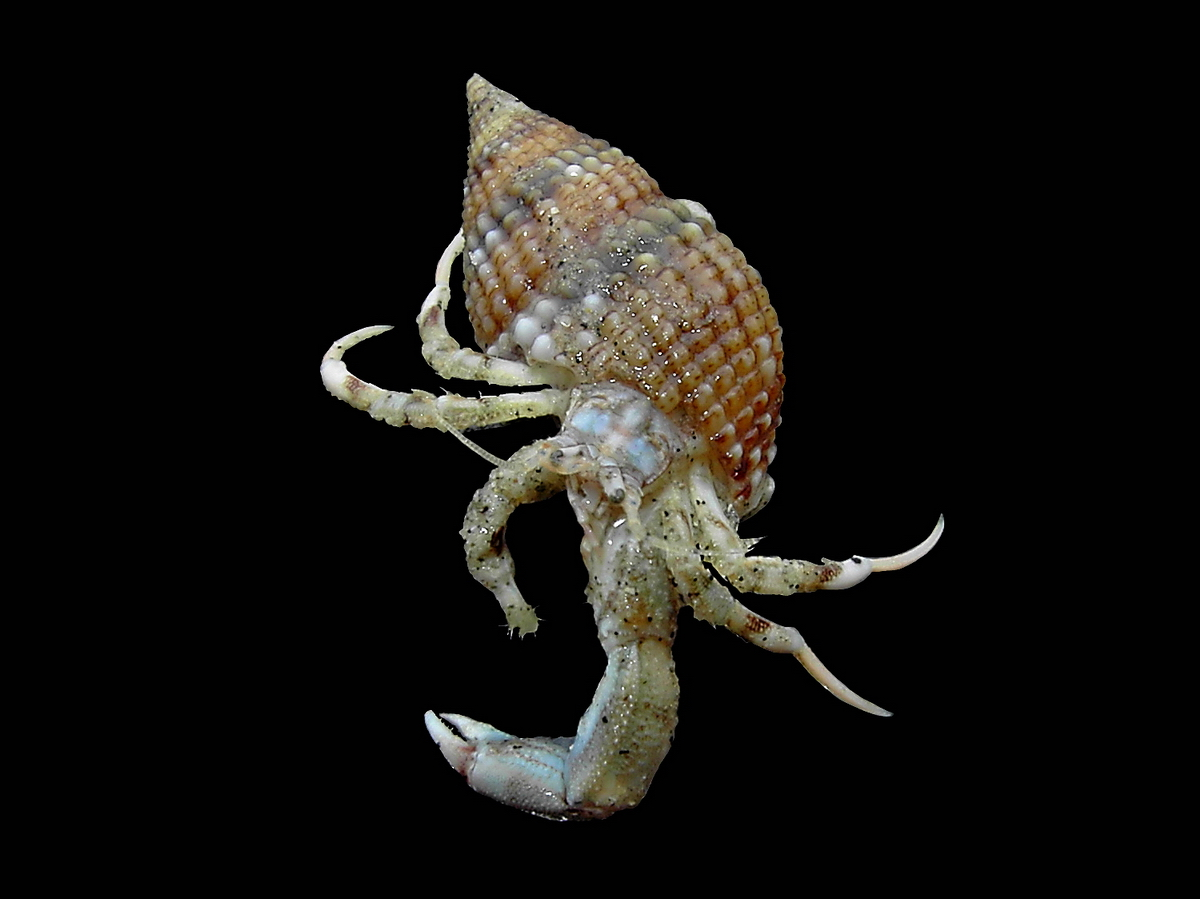
Marine hermit crab Diogenes pugilator, using a shell of the dog whelk Nassarius reticulatus

- Almost all genera of hermit crabs use or "wear" empty marine gastropod shells throughout their lifespan, in order to protect their soft abdomens, and in order to have a strong shell to withdraw into if attacked by a predator. Each individual hermit crab is forced to find another gastropod shell on a regular basis, whenever it grows too large for the one it is currently using.

Some hermit crab species live on land and may be found quite some distance from the sea, including those in the tropical genus Coenobita.

=== Conchology ===
There are numerous popular books and field guides on the subject of shell-collecting. Although there are a number of books about land and freshwater mollusks, the majority of popular books emphasize, or focus exclusively on, the shells of marine mollusks. Both the science of studying mollusk shells and the hobby of collecting and classifying them are known as conchology. The line between professionals and amateur enthusiasts is often not well defined in this subject, because many amateurs have contributed to, and continue to contribute to, conchology and the larger science of malacology. Many shell collectors belong to "shell clubs" where they can meet others who share their interests. A large number of amateurs collect the shells of marine mollusks, and this is partly because many shells wash up empty on beaches, or live in the intertidal or sub-tidal zones, and are therefore easily found and preserved without much in the way of specialized equipment or expensive supplies. Some shell collectors find their own material and keep careful records, or buy only "specimen shells", which means shells which have full collecting data: information including how, when, where, in what habitat, and by whom, the shells were collected. On the other hand, some collectors buy the more widely available commercially imported exotic shells, the majority of which have very little data, or none at all. To museum scientists, having full collecting data (when, where, and by whom it was collected) with a specimen is far more important than having the shell correctly identified. Some owners of shell collections hope to be able to donate their collection to a major natural history or zoology museum at some point, however, shells with little or no collecting data are usually of no value to science, and are likely not to be accepted by a major museum. Apart from any damage to the shell that may have happened before it was collected, shells can also suffer damage when they are stored or displayed. For an example of one rather serious kind of damage see Byne's disease.

==== Shell clubs ====
There are a number of clubs or societies which consist of people who are united by a shared interest in shells. In the US, these clubs are more common in southerly coastal areas, such as Florida and California, where the marine fauna is rich in species.

==== Identification ====
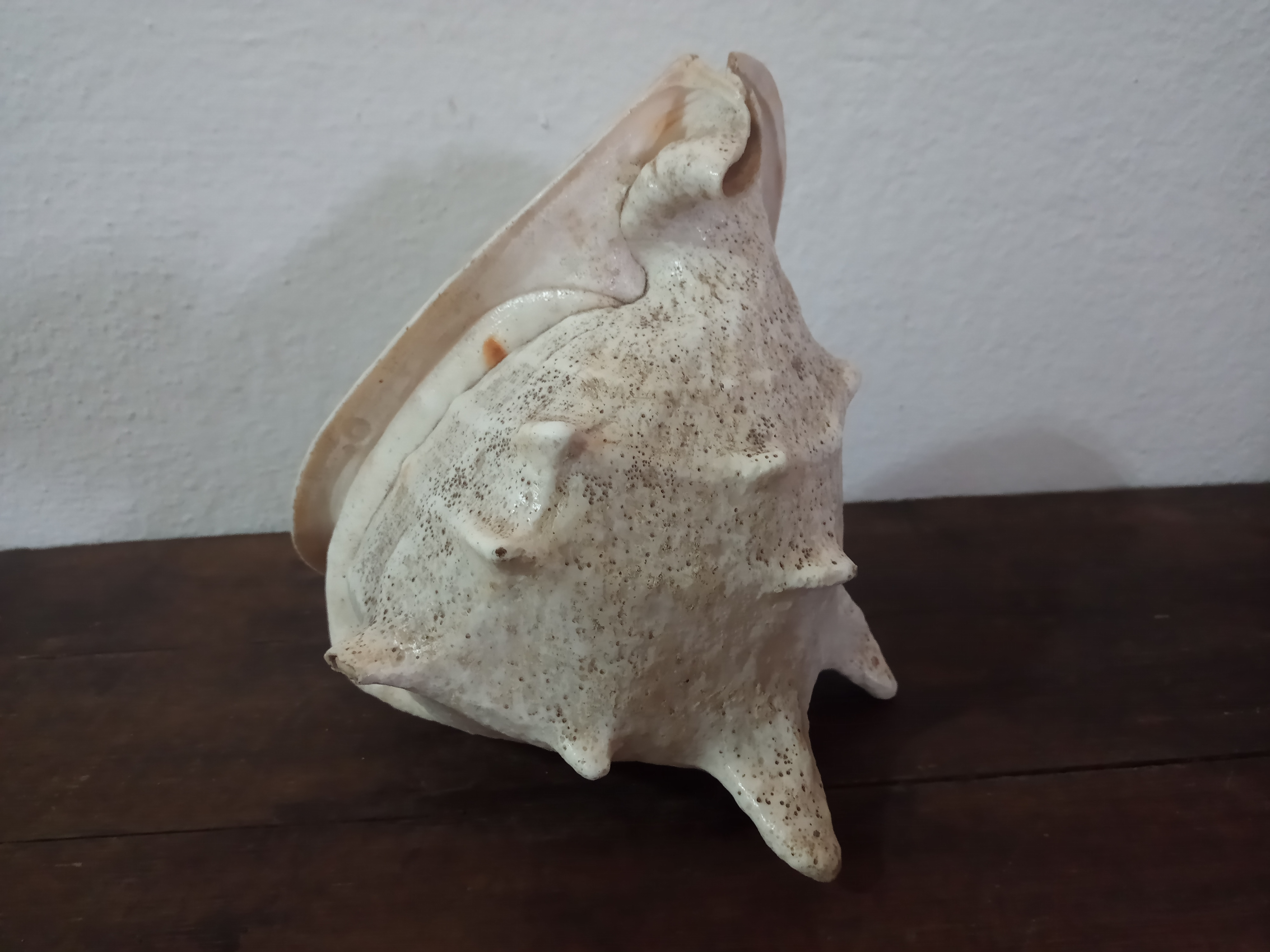
A Conch shell, often used as a musical instrument

Seashells are usually identified by consulting general or regional shell-collecting field guides, and specific scientific books on different taxa of shell-bearing mollusks (monographs) or "iconographies" (limited text – mainly photographs or other illustrations). (For a few titles on this subject in the US, see the list of books at the foot of this article.) Identifications to the species level are generally achieved by examining illustrations and written descriptions, rather than by the use of Identification keys, as is often the case in identifying plants and other phyla of invertebrates. The construction of functional keys for the identification of the shells of marine mollusks to the species level can be very difficult, because of the great variability within many species and families. The identification of certain individual species is often very difficult, even for a specialist in that particular family. Some species cannot be differentiated on the basis of shell character alone.

Numerous smaller and more obscure mollusk species (see micromollusk) are yet to be discovered and named. In other words, they have not yet been differentiated from similar species and assigned scientific (binomial) names in articles in journals recognized by the International Commission on Zoological Nomenclature (ICZN). Large numbers of new species are published in the scientific literature each year. There are currently an estimated 100,000 species of mollusks worldwide.

==== Non-marine "seashells" ====
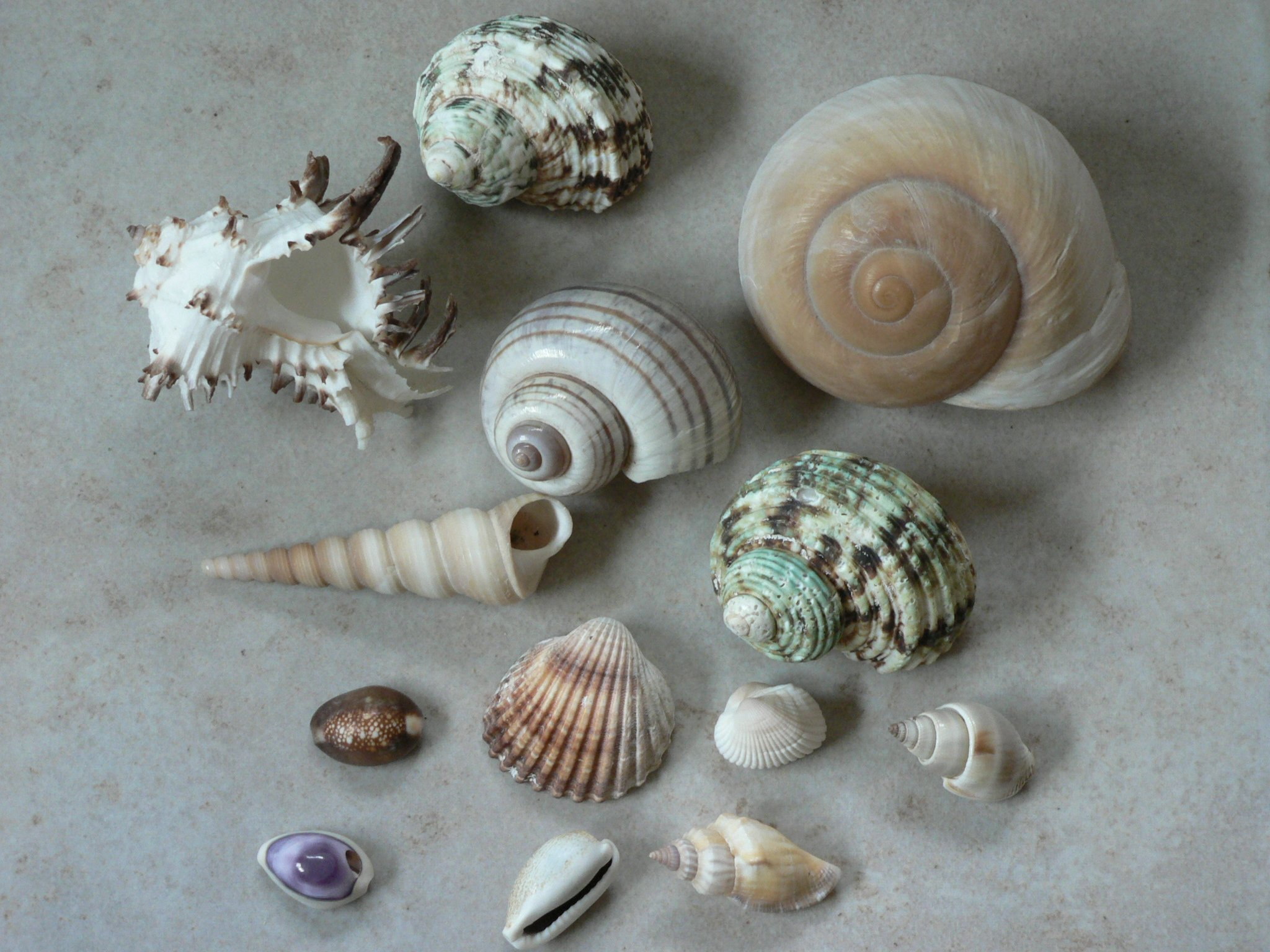
A group of purchased (mostly marine) shells includes the shell of a large tropical land snail (upper right), and a shiny freshwater apple snail shell (center)

The term seashell is also applied loosely to mollusk shells that are not of marine origin, for example by people walking the shores of lakes and rivers using the term for the freshwater mollusk shells they encounter. Seashells purchased from tourist shops or dealers may include various freshwater and terrestrial shells as well. Non-marine items offered may include large and colorful tropical land snail shells, freshwater apple snail shells, and pearly freshwater unionid mussel shells. This can be confusing to collectors, as non-marine shells are often not included in their reference books.

=== Cultural significance ===
==== Currency ====
Seashells have been used as a medium of exchange in various places, including many Indian Ocean and Pacific Ocean islands, also in North America, Africa and the Caribbean.

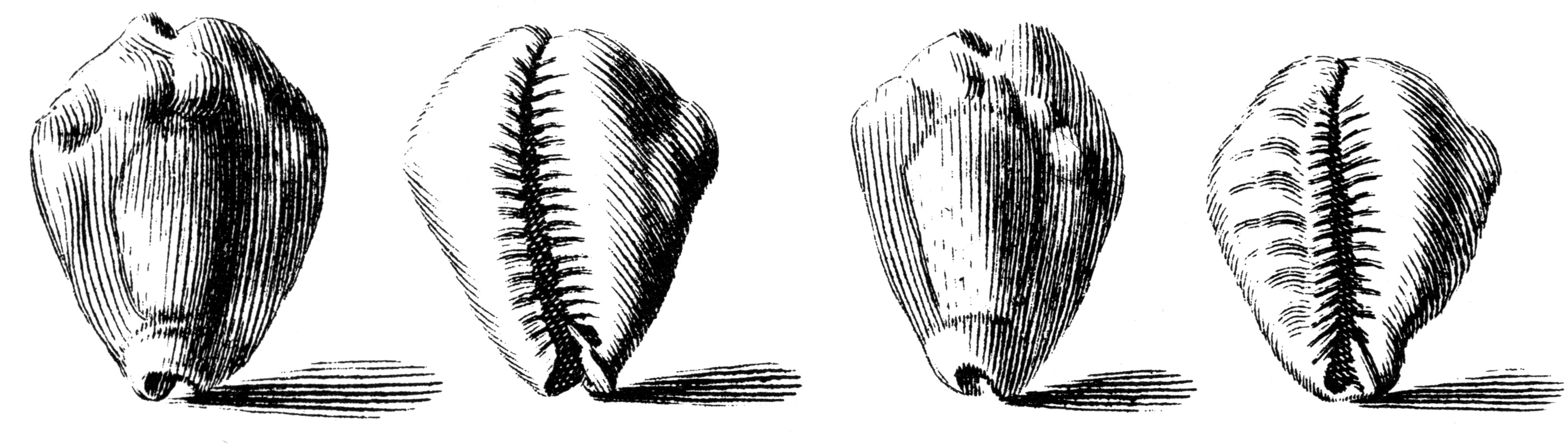
1742 drawing of shells of the money cowry, Monetaria moneta

- The most common species of shells to be used as currency have been Monetaria moneta, the "money cowry", and certain dentalium tusk shells, used in North Western North America for many centuries.
- Many of the tribes and nations all across the continent of Africa have historically used the cowry as their media of exchange. The cowry circulated, historically, alongside metal coins and goods, and foreign currencies. Being durable and easy to carry the cowry made a very favorable currency.
- Some tribes of the indigenous peoples of the Americas used shells for wampum and hair pipes. The Native American wampum belts were made of the shell of the quahog clam.

==== Tools ====
Seashells have often been used as tools, because of their strength and the variety of their shapes.

- Giant clams (Family Tridacnidae) have been used as bowls, and when big enough, even as bathtubs and baptismal fonts.
- Melo melo, the "bailer volute", is so named because Native Australians used it to bail out their canoes.
- Many different species of bivalves have been used as scrapers, blades, clasps, and other such tools, due to their shape.
- Some marine gastropods have been used for oil lamps, the oil being poured in the aperture of the shell, and the siphonal canal serving as a holder for the wick.

==== Horticulture ====
Because seashells are in some areas a readily available bulk source of calcium carbonate, shells such as oyster shells are sometimes used as soil conditioners in horticulture. The shells are broken or ground into small pieces in order to have the desired effect of raising the pH and increasing the calcium content in the soil.

==== Religion and spirituality ====
A sacred chank shell on the flag of Travancore, India

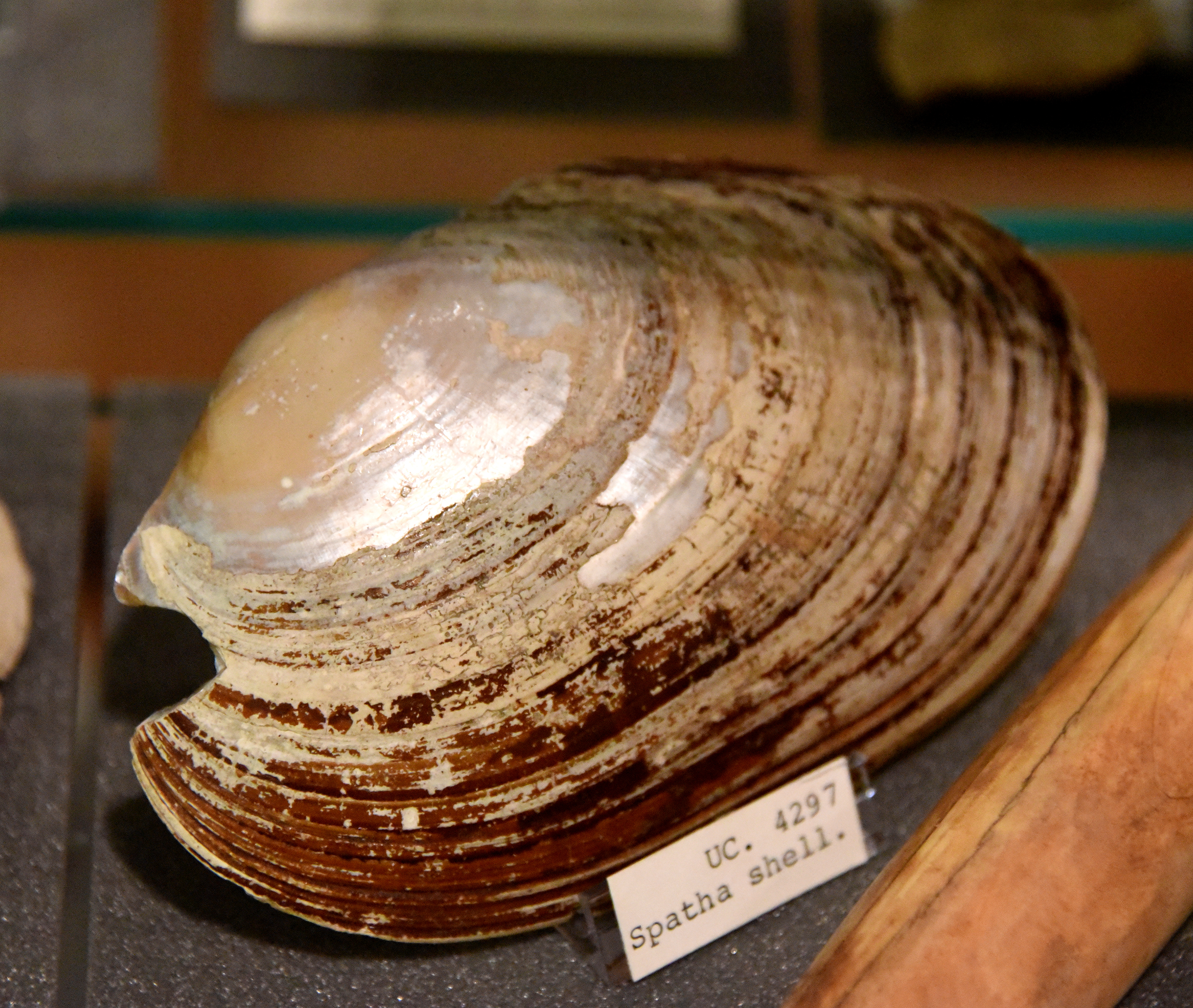
Spatha shell. From Naqada tomb 1539, Egypt. Naqada I period. The Petrie Museum of Egyptian Archaeology, London

Seashells have played a part in religion and spirituality, sometimes even as ritual objects.

- In Christianity, the scallop shell is considered to be the symbol of Saint James the Great, see Pecten jacobaeus.
- In Hinduism, left-handed shells of Turbinella pyrum (the sacred shankha) are considered to be sacred to the god Vishnu. The person who finds a left-handed chank shell (one that coils to the left) is sacred to Vishnu, as well. The chank shell also plays an important role in Buddhism.
- Cowries have often been considered to be symbols of female fertility. They were often treated as actual fertility charms. The dorsum of the shell resembles a pregnant belly, and the underside of the shell resembles a vulva. In the South Indian state of Kerala, cowries are used for making astrological predictions.
- In the Santería religion, shells are used for divination.
- The Moche culture of ancient Peru worshipped animals and the sea, and often depicted shells in their art.
- In Christianity, the top of the sand dollar represents the Star of Bethlehem that led the Wise Men to the manger of Christ. Outside the "star" you will see the Easter Lily, a sign of Jesus' Resurrection. There are four holes that represent the holes in the Lord's hands and feet. The center hole is the Wound to His Sacred Heart by the spear of Longinus. On the other side of the sand dollar, you will see Poinsettia. Lastly, if you break open the sand dollar, five doves will come out, the doves of Peace and Joy.

==== Musical instruments ====
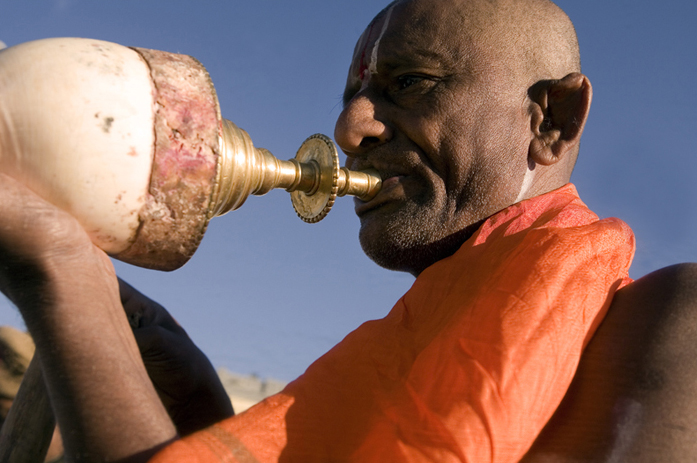
Hindu priest sounding a ritual trumpet made from Turbinella pyrum

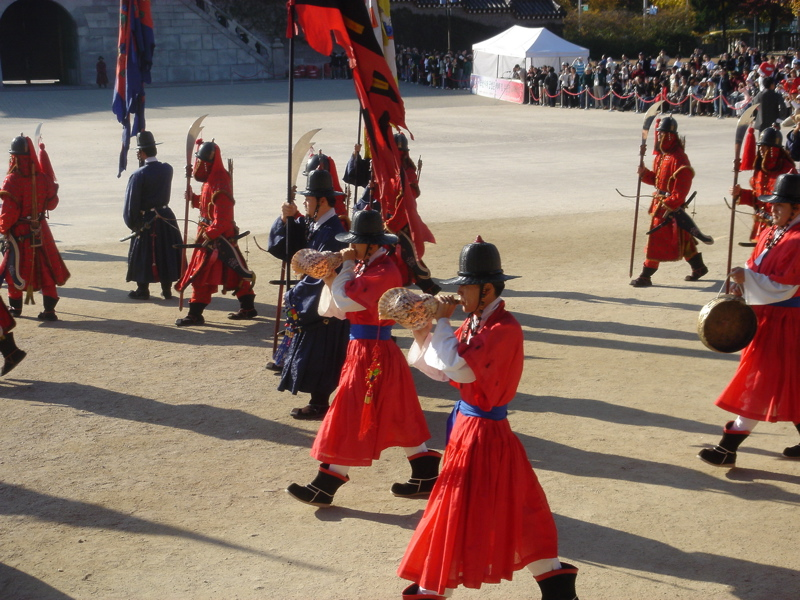
Korean military procession with Charonia trumpets

Seashells have been used as musical instruments, wind instruments for many hundreds if not thousands of years. Most often the shells of large sea snails are used, as trumpets, by cutting a hole in the spire of the shell or cutting off the tip of the spire altogether. Various different kinds of large marine gastropod shells can be turned into "blowing shells"; however, the most commonly encountered species used as "conch" trumpets are:

- The sacred chank, Turbinella pyrum, known in India as the shankha. In Tibet it is known as "dung-dkar".
- The Triton shell also known as "Triton's trumpet" Charonia tritonis which is used as a trumpet in Melanesian and Polynesian culture and also in Korea and Japan. In Japan this kind of trumpet is known as the horagai. In Korea it is known as the nagak. In some Polynesian islands it is known as "pu".
- The Queen Conch Lobatus gigas, has been used as a trumpet in the Caribbean.

Children in some cultures are often told the myth that you can hear the sound of the ocean by holding a seashell to ones ear. This is due to the effect of seashell resonance.

==== Personal adornment ====
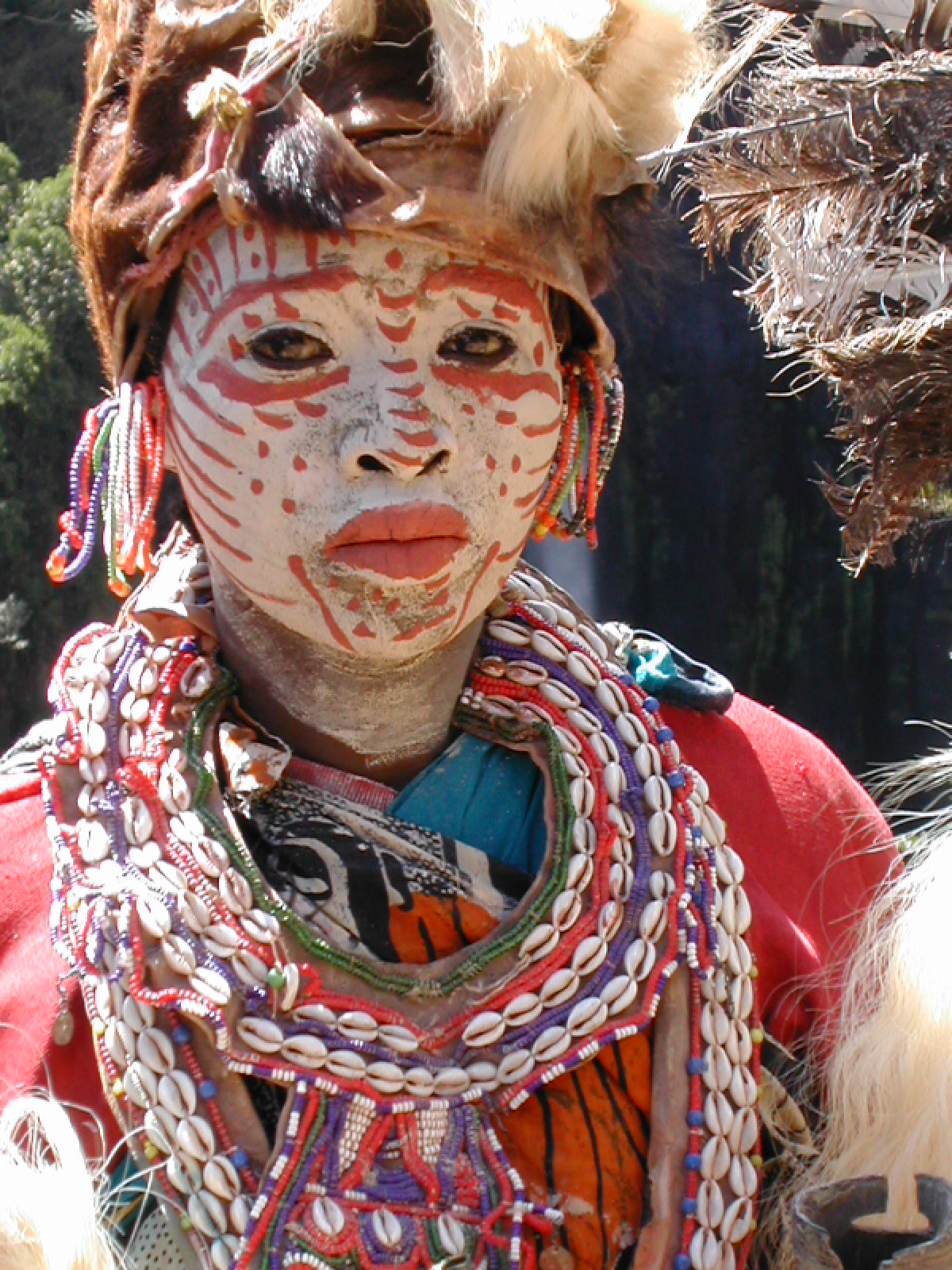
Use of gastropod shells, specifically cowries, in traditional dress of the Kikuyu people of Kenya, Africa

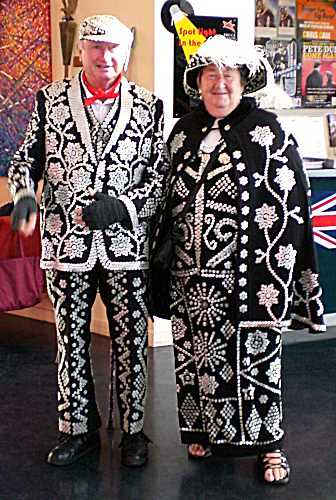
A Pearly King and Queen in London

Whole seashells or parts of sea shells have been used as jewelry or in other forms of adornment since prehistoric times. Mother of pearl was historically primarily a seashell product, although more recently some mother of pearl comes from freshwater mussels. Also see pearl.

- Shell necklaces have been found in Stone Age graves as far inland as the Dordogne Valley in France.
- Seashells are often used whole and drilled, so that they can be threaded like beads, or cut into pieces of various shapes. Sometimes shells can be found that are already "drilled" by predatory snails of the family Naticidae. Fine whole shell necklaces were made by Tasmanian Aboriginal women for more than 2,600 years. The necklaces represent a significant cultural tradition which is still practised by Palawa women elders. The shells used include pearly green and blue-green maireener (rainbow kelp) shells, brown and white rice shells, black cats' teeth shells and pink button shells.
- Naturally occurring, beachworn, cone shell "tops" (the broken-off spire of the shell, which often has a hole worn at the tip) can function as beads without any further modification. In Hawaii these natural beads were traditionally collected from the beach drift in order to make puka shell jewelry. Since it is hard to obtain large quantities of naturally occurring beachworn cone tops, almost all modern puka shell jewelry uses cheaper imitations, cut from thin shells of other species of mollusk, or even made of plastic.
- Shells historically have been and still are made into, or incorporated into, necklaces, pendants, beads, earrings, buttons, brooches, rings, hair combs, belt buckles and other uses.
- The shell of the large "bullmouth helmet" sea snail, scientific name Cypraecassis rufa, was historically, and still is, used to make valuable cameos.
- Mother of pearl from many seashells including species in the family Trochidae, Turbinidae, Haliotidae, and various pearly bivalves, has often been used in jewelry, buttons, etc.
- In London, Pearly Kings and Queens traditionally wear clothing covered in patterns made up of hundreds of "pearl buttons", in other words, buttons made of mother-of-pearl or nacre. In recent years however, the majority of "pearl buttons" are imitations that are made of pearlescent plastic.

==== Folk art ====
"Sailor's valentines" were late 19th-century decorative keepsakes which were made in the Caribbean, and which were often purchased by sailors to give to their loved ones back home, for example in England. These valentines consisted of elaborate arrangements of small seashells glued into attractive symmetrical designs, which were encased on a wooden (usually octagonal) hinged box-frame. The patterns used often featured heart-shaped designs, or included a sentimental expression of love spelled out in small shells.

The making of shell work artifacts is a practice of Aboriginal women from La Perouse in Sydney, dating back to the 19th century. Shell work objects include baby shoes, jewelry boxes and replicas of famous landmarks, including the Sydney Harbour Bridge and the Sydney Opera House. The shellwork tradition began as an Aboriginal women's craft which was adapted and tailored to suit the tourist souvenir market, and which is now considered high art.

==== Architectural decoration ====
Small pieces of colored and iridescent shell have been used to create mosaics and inlays, which have been used to decorate walls, furniture and boxes. Large numbers of whole seashells, arranged to form patterns, have been used to decorate mirror frames, furniture and human-made shell grottos.

==== Art ====
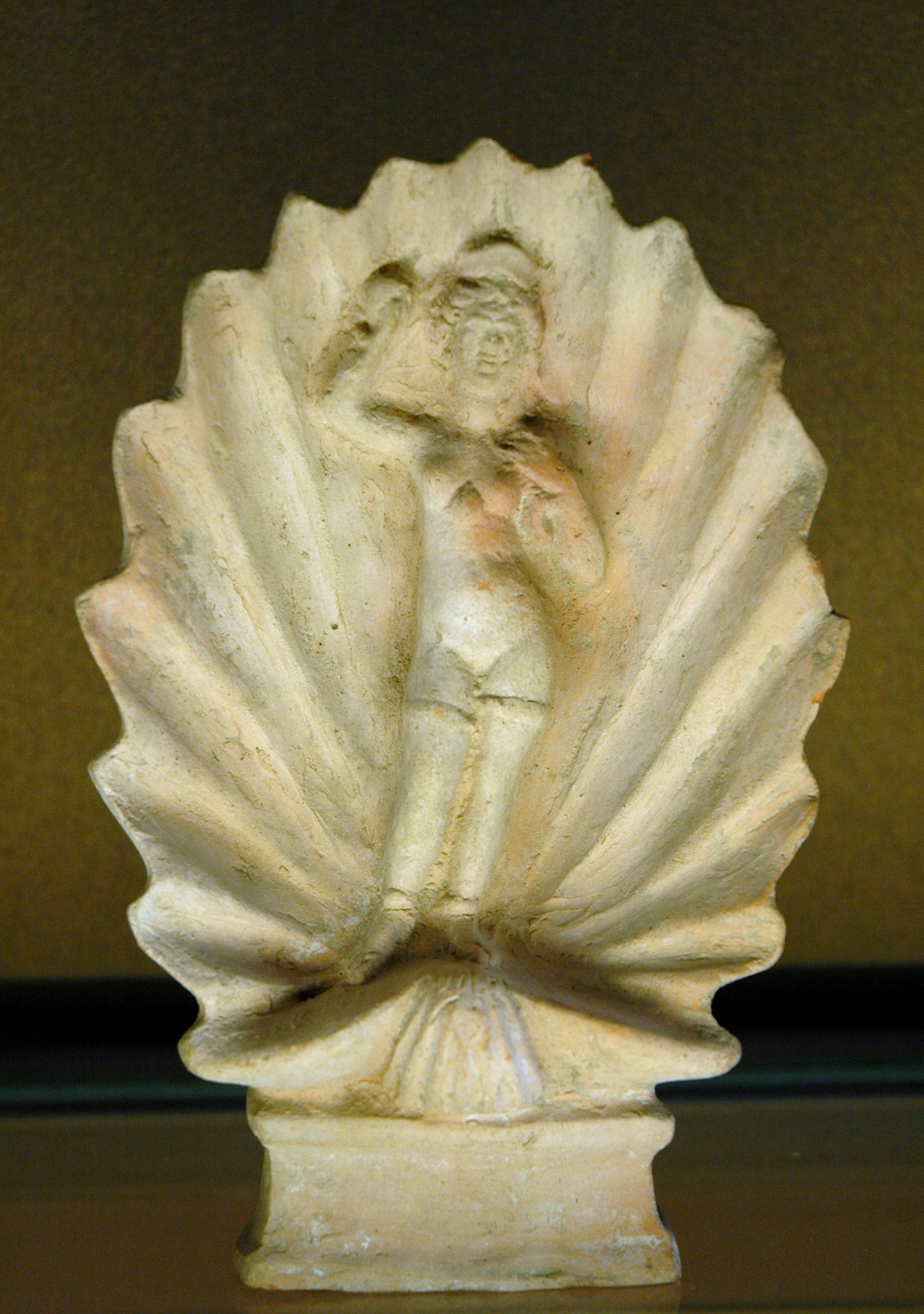
Aphrodite, 1st century BC, 13 cm, 5 in

A very large outdoor sculpture at Akkulam of a gastropod seashell is a reference to the sacred chank shell Turbinella pyrum of India. In 2003, Maggi Hambling designed a striking 13 ft (4 m) high sculpture of a scallop shell which stands on the beach at Aldeburgh, in England. The goddess of love, Venus or Aphrodite, is often traditionally depicted rising from the sea on a seashell. In The Birth of Venus, Botticelli depicted the goddess Venus rising from the ocean on a scallop shell.

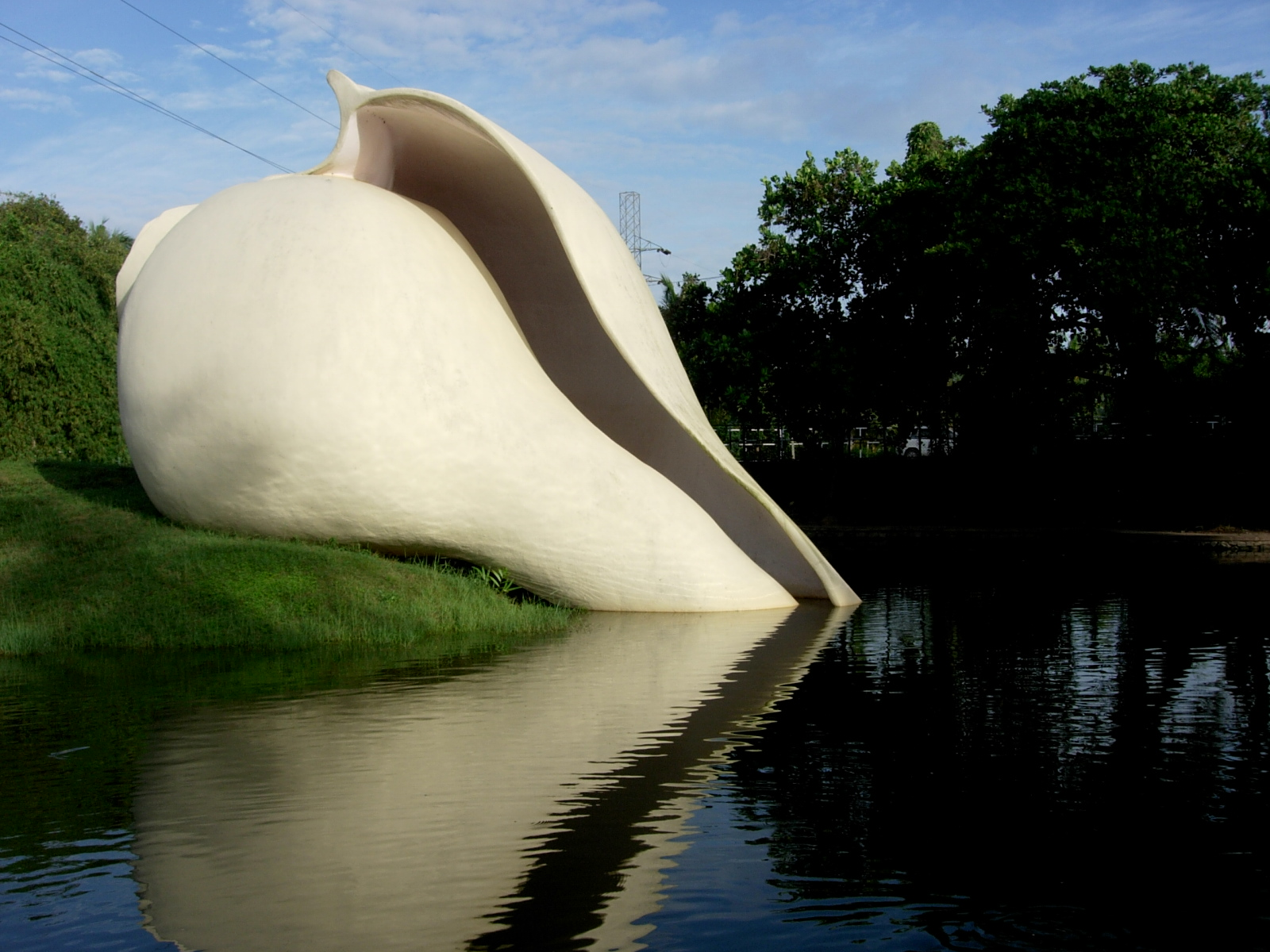
Enormous seashell sculpture at Akkulam, Thiruvananthapuram, India

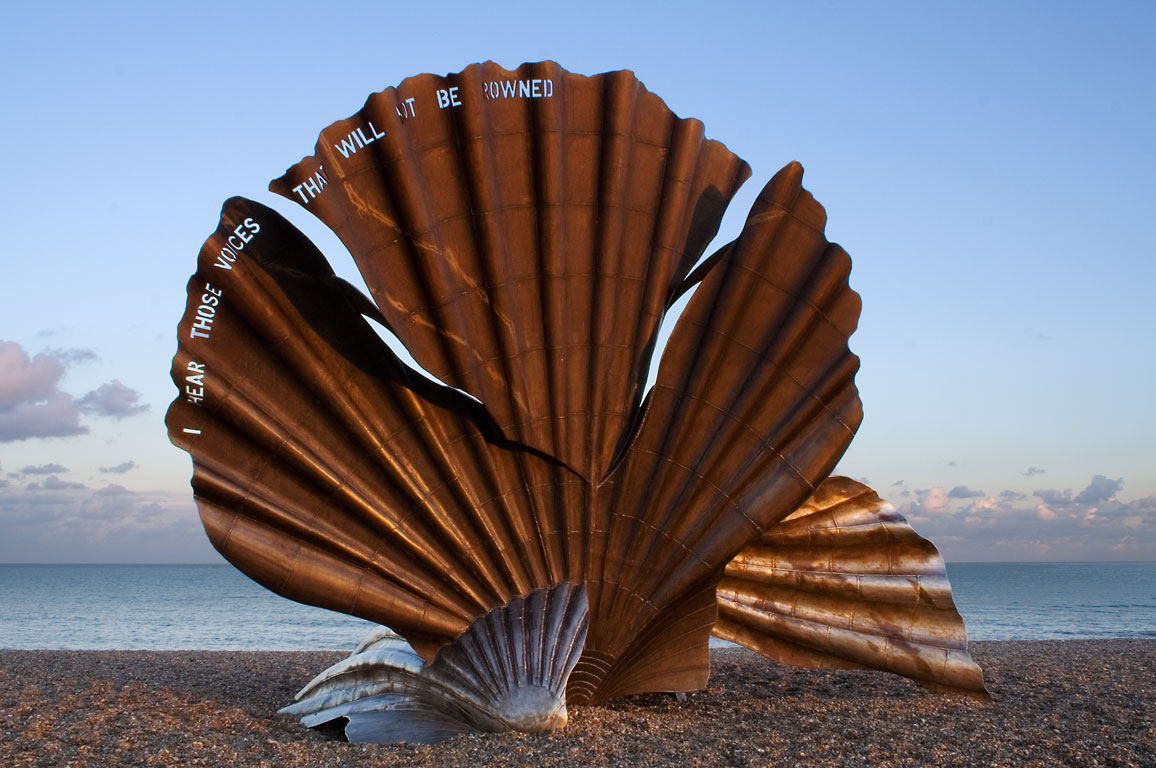
Large sculpture of a scallop on the beach at Aldeburgh, by Maggi Hambling, 2003

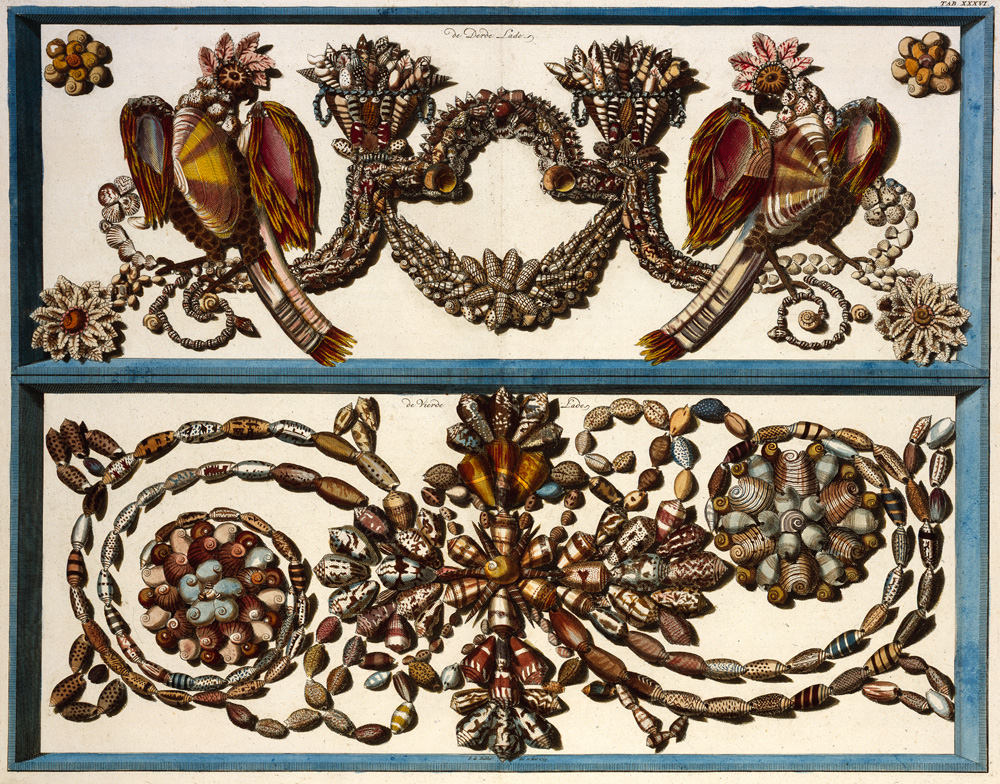
Illustration from an 18th-century book, edited by Albertus Seba. These decorative arrangements were a popular way to display seashells at the time

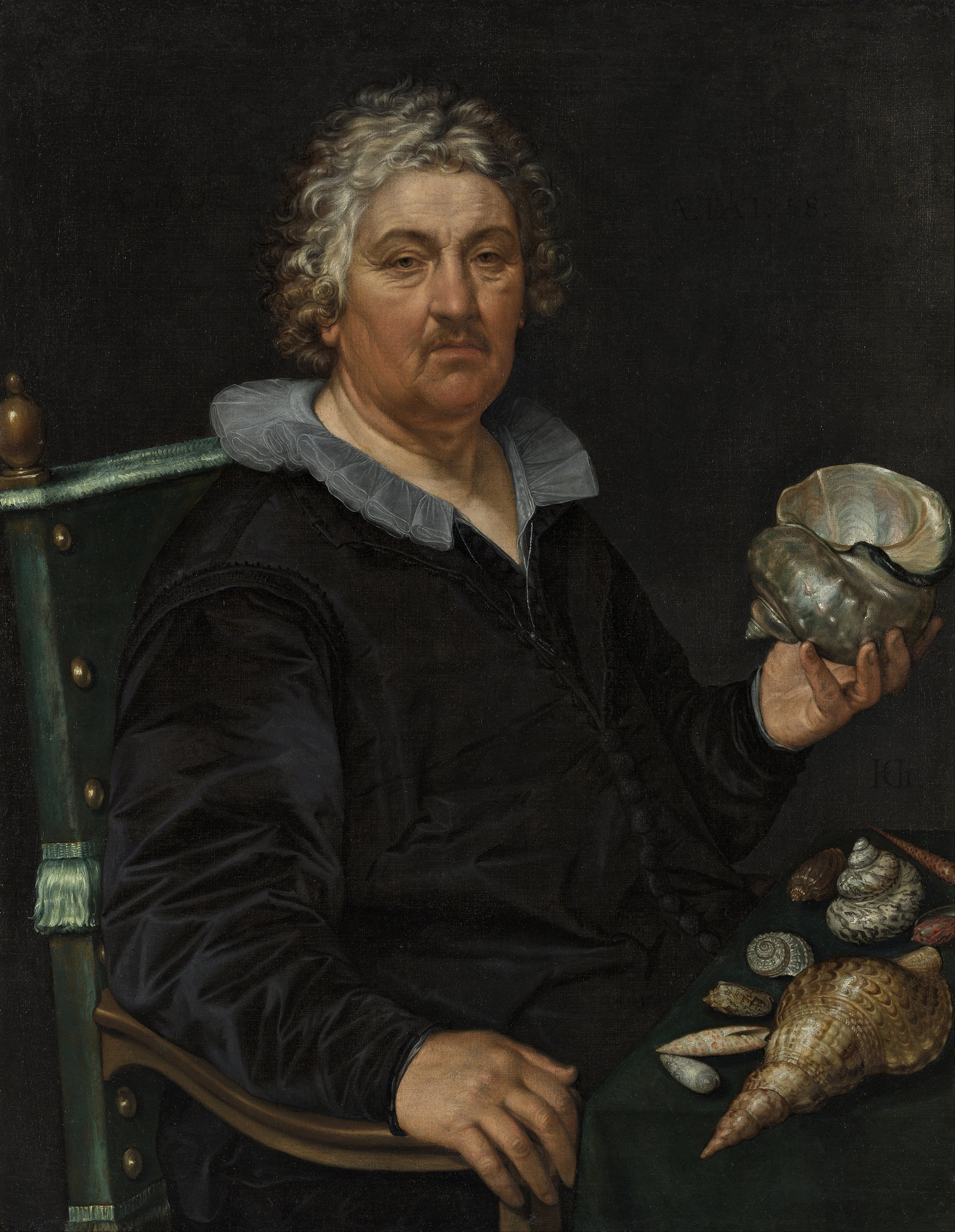
Portrait of the Shell Collector Jan Govertsen van der Aer, by Hendrick Goltzius (1603)

==== Poultry feeds ====
Sea shells found in the creek and backwater of the coast of west India are used as an additive to poultry feed. They are crushed and mixed with jowar maize and dry fish.

=== Use ===
Seashells, namely from bivalves and gastropods, are fundamentally composed of calcium carbonate. In this sense, they have potential to be used as raw material in the production of lime.

Along the Gulf Coast of the United States, oyster shells were mixed into cement to make "shellcrete" which could form bricks, blocks and platforms. It could also be applied over logs. A notable example is the 19th-century Sabine Pass Lighthouse in Louisiana, near Texas.

== Shells of other marine invertebrates ==
=== Arthropods ===
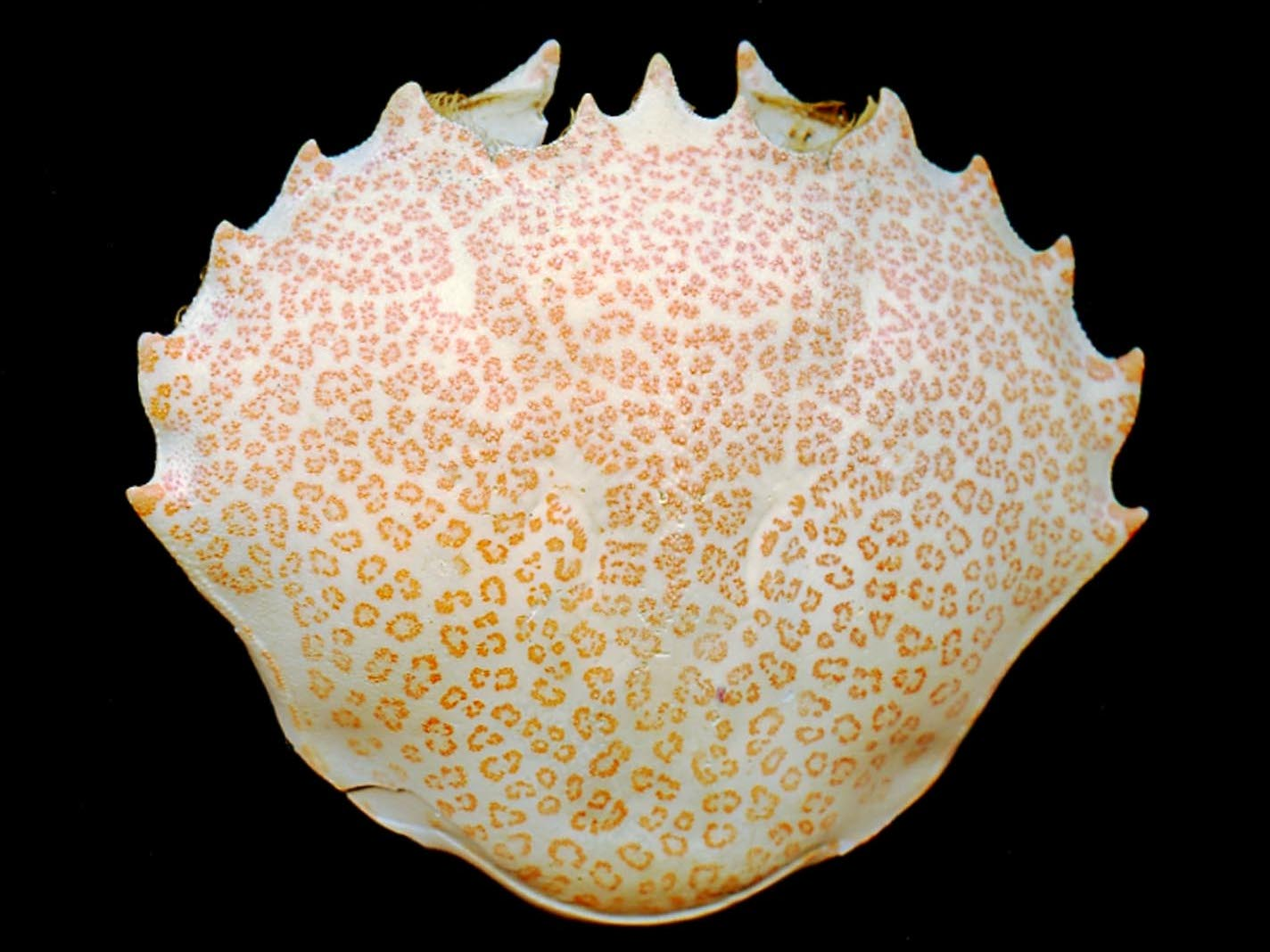
The moulted carapace of a lady crab found on the beach at Long Beach, Long Island, New York State

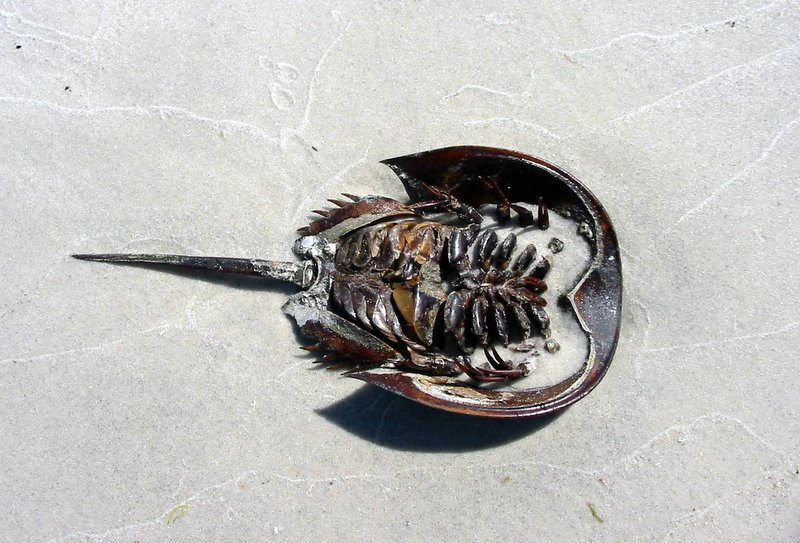
Shell of horseshoe crab on a beach

Many arthropods have sclerites, or hardened body parts, which form a stiff exoskeleton made up mostly of chitin. In crustaceans, especially those of the class Malacostraca (crabs, shrimps and lobsters, for instance), the plates of the exoskeleton may be fused to form a more or less rigid carapace. Moulted carapaces of a variety of marine malacostraceans often wash up on beaches. The horseshoe crab is an arthropod of the family Limulidae. The shells or exuviae of these arachnid relatives are common in beach drift in certain areas of the world.

=== Echinoderms ===
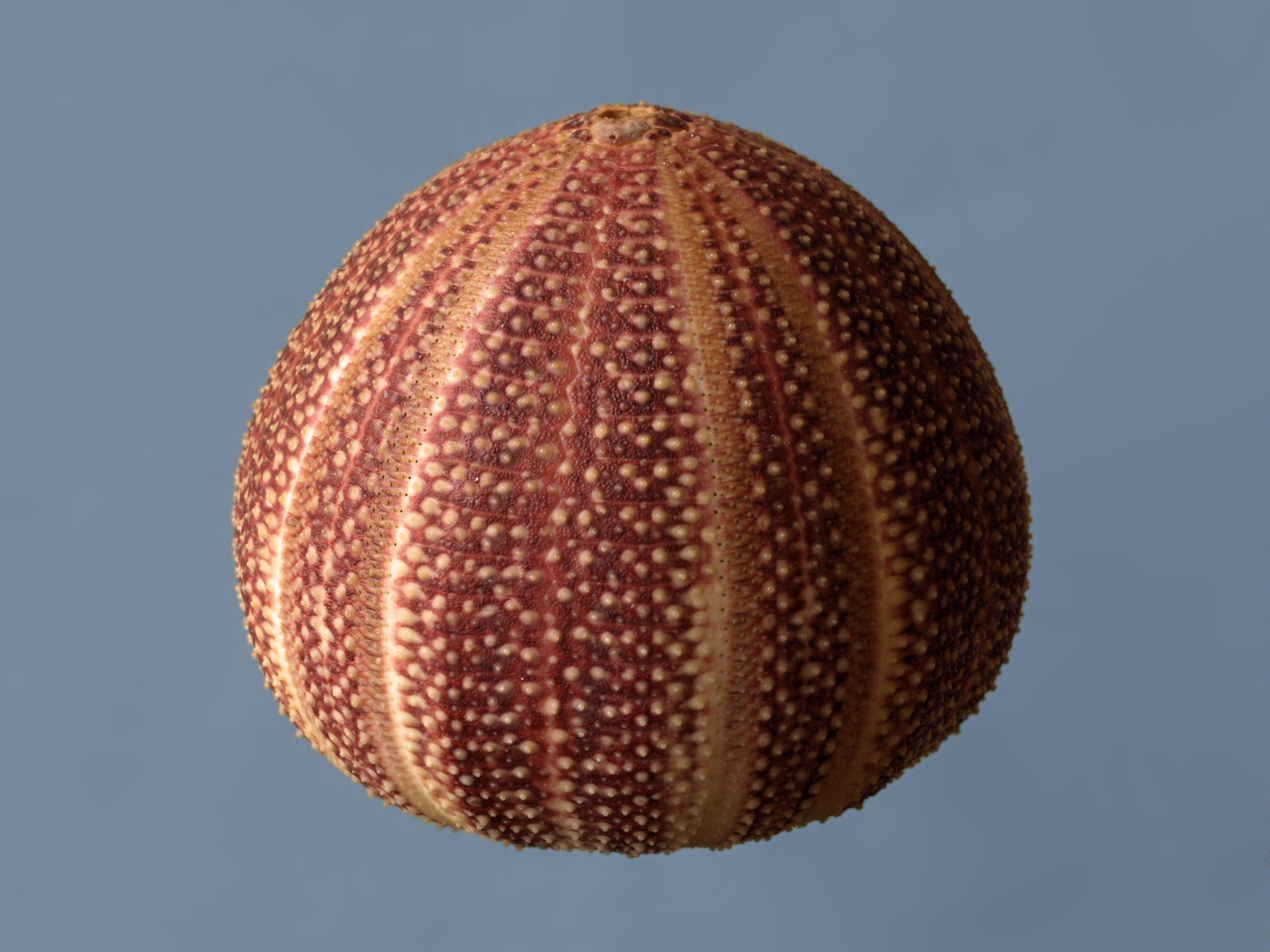
Sea urchin test

Some echinoderms such as sea urchins, including heart urchins and sand dollars, have a hard "test" or shell. After the animal dies, the flesh rots out and the spines fall off, and then fairly often the empty test washes up whole onto a beach, where it can be found by a beachcomber. These tests are fragile and easily broken into pieces.

=== Brachiopods ===
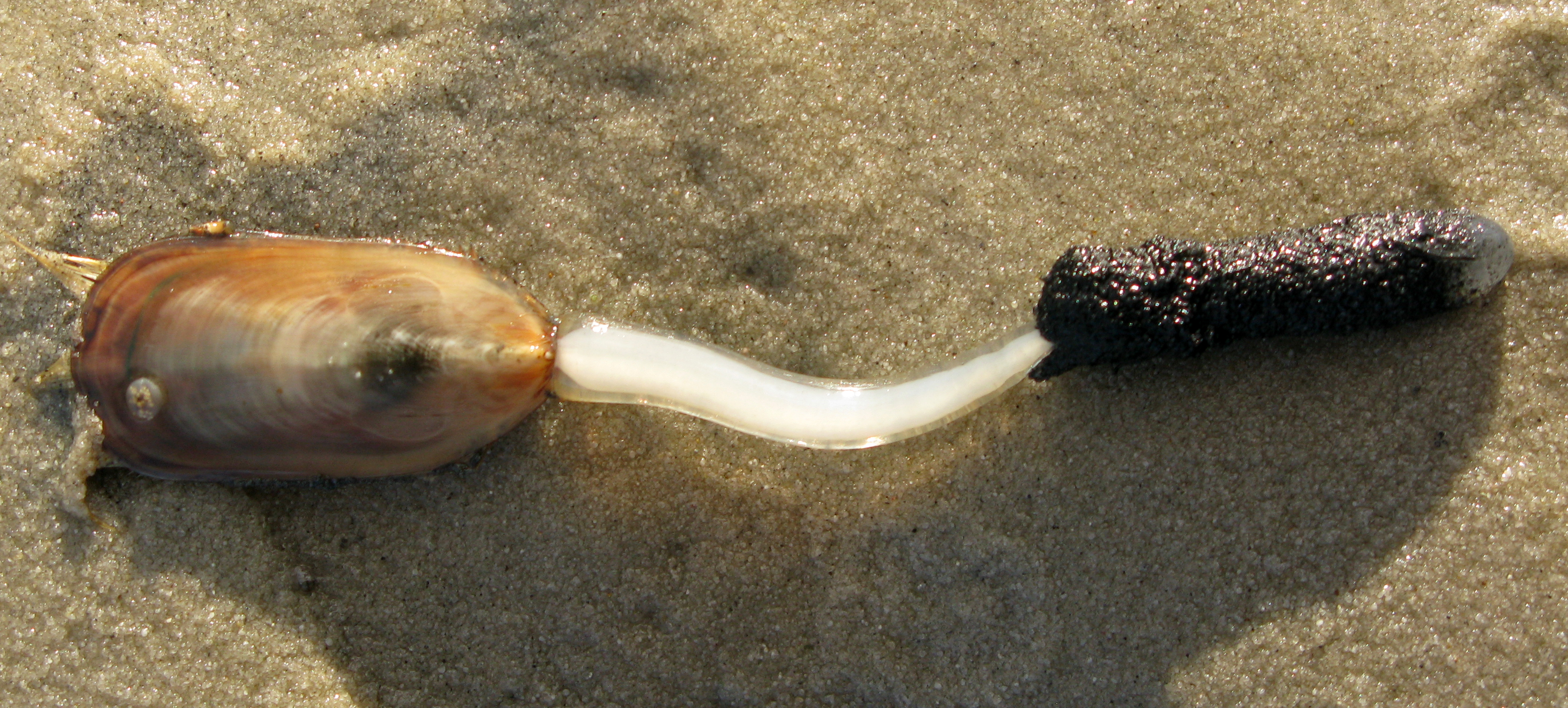
A whole animal of the brachiopod Lingula anatina from Australia with the shell showing on the left

The brachiopods, or lamp shells, superficially resemble clams, but the phylum is not closely related to mollusks. Most lines of brachiopods ended during the Permian-Triassic extinction event, and their ecological niche was filled by bivalves. A few of the remaining species of brachiopods occur in the low intertidal zone and thus can be found live by beachcombers.

=== Annelids ===
Some polychaetes, marine annelid worms in the family Serpulidae, secrete a hard tube made of calcium carbonate, adhering to stones or other shells. This tube resembles, and can be confused with, the shell of marine gastropod mollusks in the family Vermetidae, the worm snails.

== Atypical shells ==
A few other categories of marine animals leave remains which might be considered "seashells" in the widest possible sense of the word.

=== Chelonians ===
Sea turtles have a carapace and plastron of bone and cartilage which is developed from their ribs. Infrequently a turtle "shell" will wash up on a beach.

=== Hard corals ===
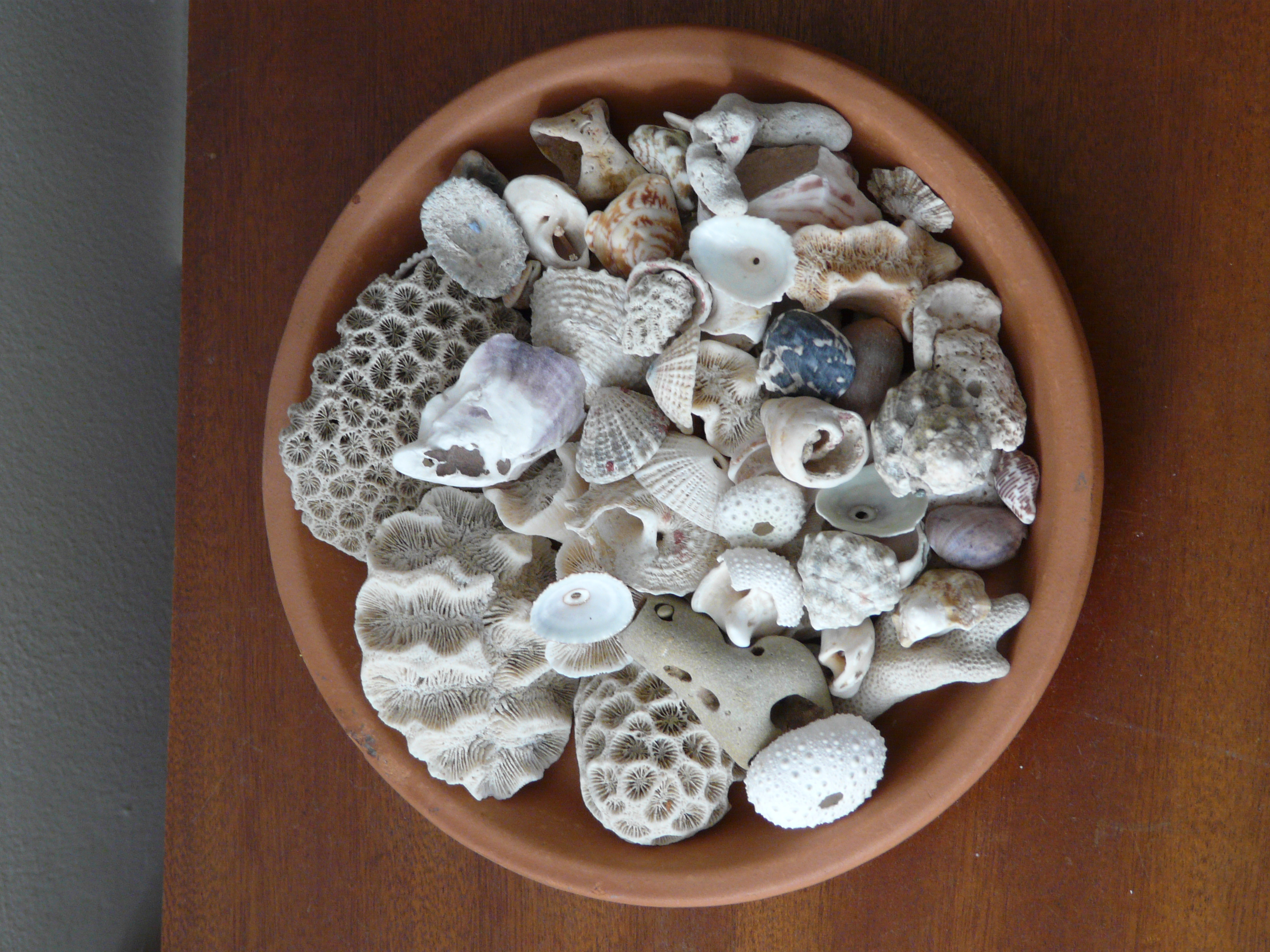
Dish with beachworn coral pieces, marine gastropod shells, and echinoderm tests, from the Caribbean and the Mediterranean

Pieces of the hard skeleton of corals commonly wash up on beaches in areas where corals grow.

The construction of the shell-like structures of corals are aided by a symbiotic relationship with a class of algae, zooxanthellae. Typically a coral polyp will harbor particular species of algae, which will photosynthesise and thereby provide energy for the coral and aid in calcification, while living in a safe environment and using the carbon dioxide and nitrogenous waste produced by the polyp. Coral bleaching is a disruption of the balance between polyps and algae, and can lead to the breakdown and death of coral reefs.

=== Soft corals ===
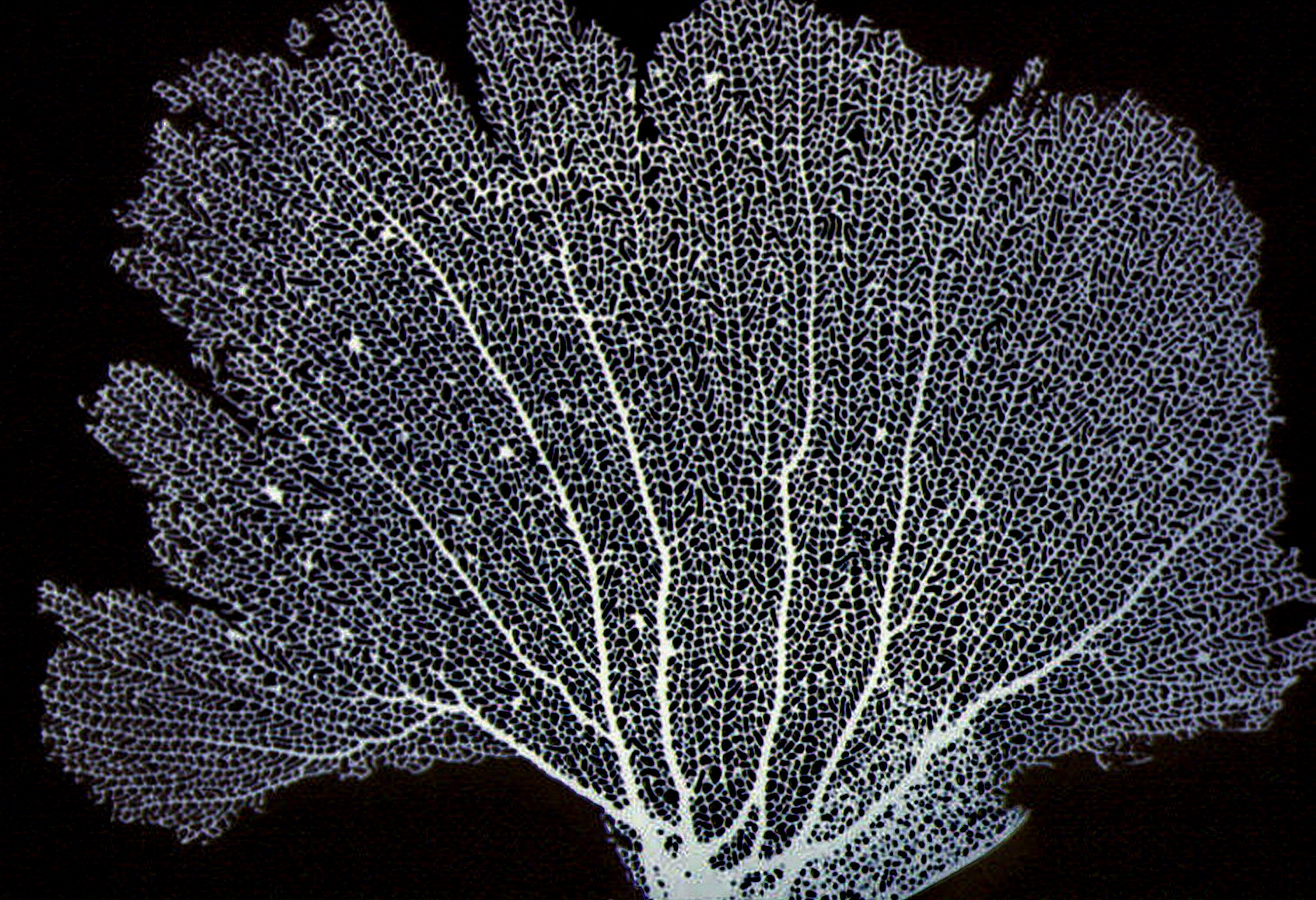
An x-ray photograph of a gorgonian

The skeletons of soft corals such as gorgonians, also known as sea fans and sea whips, commonly wash ashore in the tropics after storms.

=== Plankton and protists ===
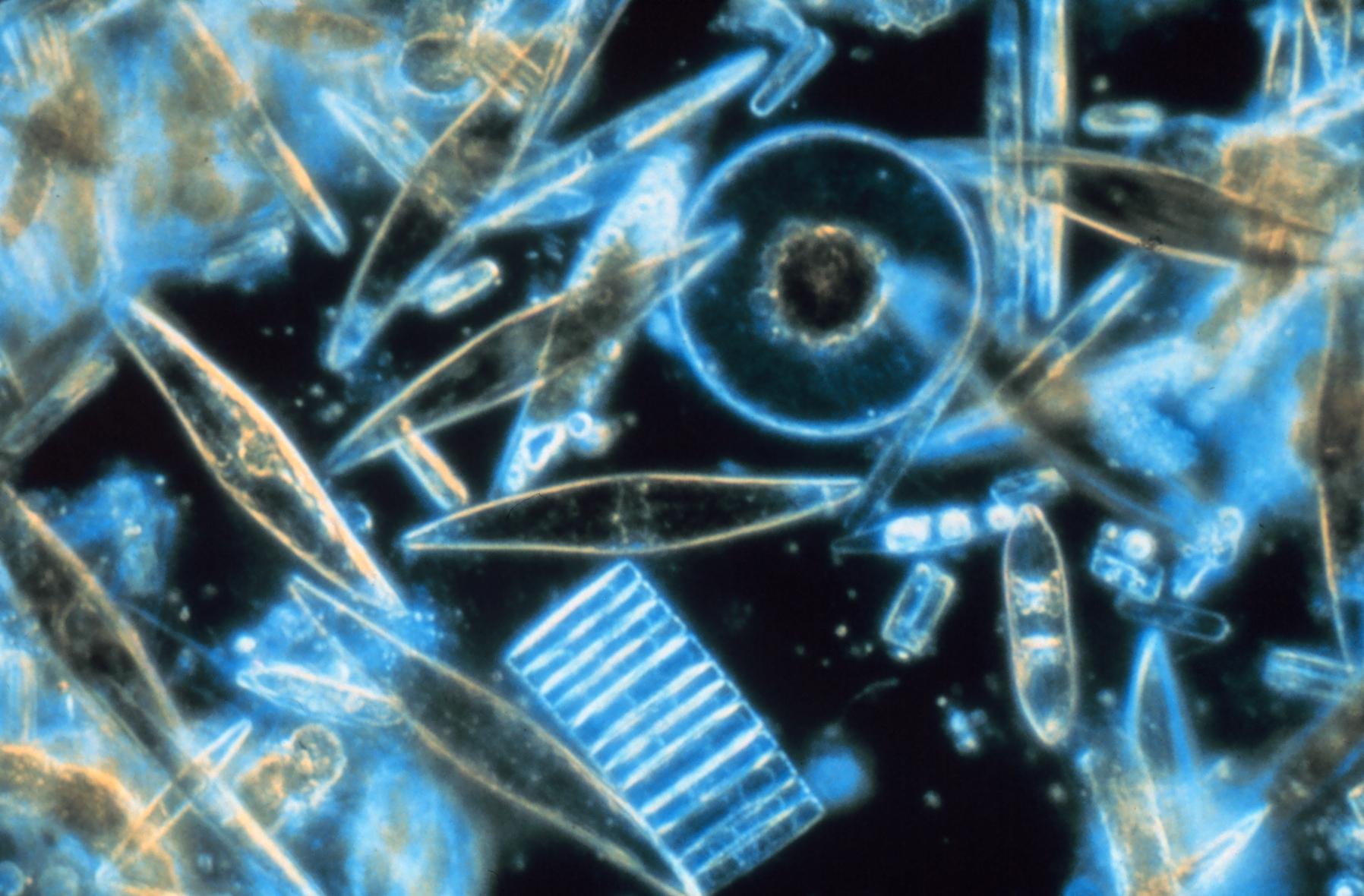
Marine diatoms form hard silicate shells

Plant-like diatoms and animal-like radiolarians are two forms of plankton which form hard silicate shells. Foraminifera and coccolithophores create shells known as "tests" which are made of calcium carbonate. These shells and tests are usually microscopic in size, though in the case of foraminifera, they are sometimes visible to the naked eye, often resembling miniature mollusk shells.

== See also ==
- Bailey-Matthews Shell Museum
- Marine biogenic calcification
- Mollusc shell
- Ocean acidification
- Seashell resonance
- Seashell surface, a mathematical construct
- Shell growth in estuaries
- Shell purse
- Small shelly fauna
