= Seashell resonance =

Folk myth

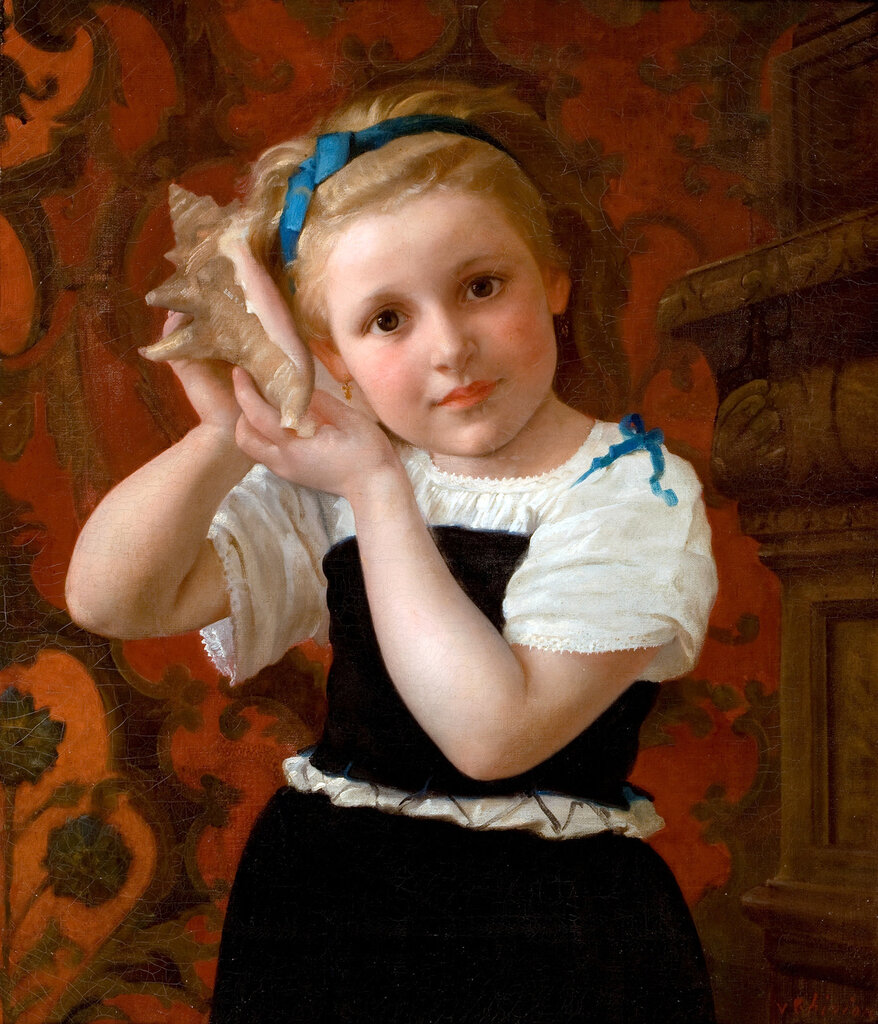
"Listening to the sea shell" by Charles Victor Thirion

Seashell resonance refers to a popular folk myth that the sound of the ocean may be heard through seashells, particularly conch shells. This effect is similarly observed in any resonant cavity, such as an empty cup or a hand clasped to the ear.

The resonant sounds are created from ambient noise in the surrounding environment by the processes of reverberation and (acoustic) amplification within the cavity of the shell. The ocean-like quality of seashell resonance is due in part to the similarity between airflow and ocean movement sounds. The association of seashells with the ocean likely plays a further role. Resonators attenuate or emphasize some ambient noise frequencies in the environment, including airflow within the resonator and sound originating from the body, such as bloodflow and muscle movement. These sounds are normally discarded by the auditory cortex; however, they become more obvious when louder external sounds are filtered out. This occlusion effect occurs with seashells and other resonators such as circumaural headphones, raising the acoustic impedance to external sounds.
