= Kaatsu =

Physical exercise method based on blood flow moderation

- Industry: Exercise equipment
- Founded: 1966
- Website: kaatsu.com

Kaatsu (Japanese: 加圧, often styled as KAATSU or KA_{A}TSU) is a patented exercise method developed by Dr. Yoshiaki Sato that is based on blood flow moderation exercise involving compression of the vasculature proximal to the exercising muscles by the Kaatsu Master device.

== Invention ==
In 1966 at the age of 18 while Yoshiaki Sato was attending a Buddhist ceremony in his native Japan, his legs went numb while sitting in the traditional Japanese posture on the floor. Out of desperation, he began to massage his calves in an attempt to relieve the discomfort during the long ceremony. He realized that his blood circulation was blocked in his calves. The feeling was similar to "the pump" he experienced as a bodybuilder, referring to the swelling of one's muscles during a workout. This was when he conceived the original idea of blood flow moderation training.

In response, Sato opened the Sato Sports Plaza in 1973 (the Sato Sports Plaza), which he operated between 1973 and 1982, treating thousands of people of all ages, and with a variety of health conditions.

The specialised equipment is patented and sold for use by certified instructors and others.

== Research ==
Kaatsu Training was named one of the collaborative projects of the University of Tokyo Hospital's 22nd Century Medical and Research Center. Sato also began to offer an ischemic circulatory physiology course at the University of Tokyo Hospital and conducted joint development work with the Japan Manned Space Systems Corporation.

In 2014, Dr Sato established the Kaatsu Research Foundation. Research on KAATSU has also been conducted in the United States at Harvard Medical School and the University of Missouri, in Japan at the University of Tokyo Hospital and Osaka University, in China at Peking University and Jilin University, in Brazil at the Hospital Israelita Albert Einstein in São Paulo, and many other academic research institutions.
