= Occlusion effect =

Auditory phenomenon caused by a filled outer ear canal

The occlusion effect occurs when an object fills the outer portion of a person's ear canal, causing that person to perceive echo-like "hollow" or "booming" sounds generated from their voice, chewing, footsteps, or any other sounds originating in their own body.

The bone-conducted sound travels to the cochlea through different pathways. The outer ear pathway corresponds to the sound pressure generated in the ear canal cavity due to the vibration of the ear canal wall, which constitutes the source of the occlusion effect. At low frequencies, the outer ear pathway is negligible when the ear canal is open but dominates when the ear canal is occluded. The occlusion effect is thus objectively characterized by an acoustic pressure increase in the occluded ear canal at low frequencies and which can be measured with a probe-tube microphone.

Considering that the vibrating ear canal wall acts as an ideal source of volume velocity (also known as volumetric flow rate), the occlusion device increases the “opposition” of the ear canal cavity to the volume velocity imposed by its wall and thus increases the amplitude of the acoustic pressure that is generated in reaction, leading to the occlusion effect.

The acoustic impedance of the ear canal cavity represents its “opposition” to the volume velocity transfer and governs its reaction in terms of acoustic pressure. In other words, the occlusion effect is mainly caused by the increase of the acoustic impedance of the ear canal cavity when it is occluded.

A person with normal hearing can experience the occlusion effect by sticking their fingers into their ears and talking. Otherwise, this effect is often experienced by hearing aid users who only have mild to moderate high-frequency hearing loss but use hearing aids which block the entire ear canal. The occlusion effect is also deemed to be a notable source of discomfort to workers wearing shallowly inserted passive occlusion devices such as earplugs.

Active occlusion algorithms are needed to adequately help people with severe hearing loss. If a person suffers from "near-normal low-frequency hearing and mild to moderate hearing loss of up to 70 dB at mid and high frequencies," hearing aids with increased vent size or hollow ear-molds/domes are more suitable for them in lessening the extent of the occlusion effect. In the latter case, the open-fitting decreases the ear canal acoustic impedance and thus lessens the occlusion effect.

For earplug users, an incomplete seal has a similar effect at frequencies lower than the Helmholtz resonance formed by the system (with the neck of the resonator corresponding to the incomplete seal at the interface of the earplug and ear canal wall, and the resonator cavity being the partially occluded ear canal). In general, deep-fitting reduces the occlusion effect because the volume velocity imposed by the ear canal wall to the occluded ear canal cavity decreases since the surface as well as the vibration amplitude of the remaining ear canal wall diminish with the insertion depth.

== See also ==
- Lombard effect
- Seashell resonance
