= Occlusive dressing =

Air- and water-tight trauma dressing

An occlusive dressing is an air- and water-tight trauma medical dressing used in first aid. These dressings are generally made with a waxy coating so as to provide a total seal, and as a result do not have the absorbent properties of gauze pads.

They are typically used to treat open, or "sucking," chest wounds (open pneumothorax) to prevent a tension pneumothorax (a serious complication of a simple pneumothorax). In that case, they are commonly made with an opened side that lets air go out but not in.

They are also used in conjunction with a moist sterile dressing for intestinal evisceration.

Occlusive dressings come in various forms, including petrolatum gauze, which sticks to the skin surrounding the wound using petrolatum.

They can also be used to enhance the penetration and absorption of topically-applied medications, such as ointments and creams. Furthermore, they may be used as part of in vivo acute toxicity tests of dermal irritation and sensitization. The test animal is shaved and the test material is applied to the skin and wrapped in an occlusive material. The skin is then exposed after 23 hours and an assessment for redness and edema is made. This assessment is repeated 48 hours later.

On the loss of a fingernail or thumbnail, the area under the eponychium (cuticle) can be packed with this type of dressing to act as a stent. This helps prevent the cuticle from fusing to the exposed nail bed; otherwise, such fusion can prevent regrowth of a new nail.
