= Blood flow restriction training =

Exercise method involving vasculature compression

Blood flow restriction training / Occlusion Training (also abbreviated BFR training) or Occlusion Training or KAATSU is an exercise and rehabilitation modality where resistance exercise, aerobic exercise or physical therapy movements are performed while using an Occlusion Cuff which is applied to the proximal aspect of the muscle on either the arms or legs. In this novel training method developed in Japan by Dr. Yoshiaki Sato in 1966, limb (legs or arms) venous blood flow is restricted via the occlusion cuff throughout the contraction cycle and rest period. This result is partial restriction of arterial inflow to muscle, but, most significantly, it restricts venous outflow from the muscle. Given the light-load and strengthening capacity of BFR training, it can provide an effective clinical rehabilitation stimulus without the high levels of joint stress and cardiovascular risk associated with heavy-load training.

== Application ==
Practitioners include physical therapists, orthopedic surgeons, chiropractors, trainers, coaches and athletes. Users include individuals who are injured and disabled. Occlusion cuffs are of various widths. The use of occlusion cuffs is based on published scientific literature. The current approaches that focus on applying BFR during exercise consist of automatic pneumatic tourniquet systems or handheld inflatable devices. Research demonstrating the influence of thigh circumference and cuff width on occlusion pressure indicates a likely need for an individualised approach to BFR, particularly with regard to the setting of the restriction pressure.

More recently, a technique to calculate and prescribe the occlusive stimulus as a percentage of total limb occlusion pressure is just one example of efforts to account for the above factors and provide an individualized approach to prescribing BFR training. While the relationship between BFR pressure and the underlying tissue compression during exercise is not yet fully understood, BFR training using 40%–80% of limb occlusion pressure is safe and effective when supervised by experienced practitioners; therefore, lower pressures may provide less risk without the need for higher pressure. Professor Sir Yoshiaki Sato, M.D., Ph.D. of Tokyo, Japan invented KAATSU Training or BFR in 1966 in Tokyo, Japan and is the Chief Executive Office of KAATSU Japan Co., Ltd.

== Physiology ==
Blood flow restriction training combined with low intensity resistance training may be able to provide similar effects on muscle hypertrophy as high-intensity resistance training alone. During blood flow restriction hypoxia is generated, which is directly correlated to muscle hypertrophy. This limited amount of oxygen in the muscle tissue leads to a build-up of metabolites. This leads to an increase in the plasma concentration of growth hormone (GH), lactate levels, and the proliferation of satellite cells. During high intensity resistance training, lactate is released and builds up in the muscles. Lactate build up increases the amount of growth hormone available. Growth hormone stimulates IGF-1, which combines satellite cells with muscle fibers to create new muscle cells. Since the effects of blood flow restriction training have proven to be similar to those of high intensity resistance training alone, blood flow restriction training with low intensity training can potentially induce muscle hypertrophy while placing less stress on injured joints, allowing for continued recovery. Furthermore, additional physiological changes observed during BFR training include greater fast-twitch muscle fiber recruitment, increased growth hormone levels, and increased post-exercise hypotension.

== Adaptations ==
Historically, exercise loads of approximately 70% of an individual's one repetition maximum (1RM) have been deemed necessary to elicit muscle hypertrophy and strength gains. In recent years, research has demonstrated that augmentation of low-load resistance training with blood flow restriction (LL-BFR) to the active muscles can produce significant hypertrophy and strength gains, using loads as low as 30% 1RM. BFR training has been found to yield hypertrophy responses comparable to that observed with heavy-load resistance training. Recently,(2019) it has also been indicated that BFR training induces beneficial changes in tendon structure and tendon stiffness.

Besides physiological adaptations, BFRT may have psychological effects. These psychological effects may deter an individual from participating in BFRT due to increased rate of perceived exertion (RPE). This may be especially true in fields of physical therapy as many individuals do not participate in strength training. However, with continued training, individuals build tolerance to BFRT and RPE decreases compared to traditional strength training.

== Benefits ==
BFRT has been shown to improve physical function, and improve pain and stiffness in patients with knee osteoarthritis (OA). When BFRT is used with the quadriceps, it not only increases lower limb muscle mass and strength, but significantly improves the functionality of the knee. Studies have shown that BFR training also allows patients with knee (OA) to endure more intense exercises with less pain. In other words, patients who used BFR training for exercises were compared to patients who did not, and it was found that those who used BFR training were less likely to discontinue their exercises due to pain. BFRT has shown to be a promising adjuvant therapy in dermatomyositis, polymyositis, and inclusion body myositis.

BFRT has been shown to directly improve muscle strength and size in addition to markers of sports performance. The sports specific tests that have been implicated to improve with BFRT include: sprint testing, countermovement jump power, muscular endurance, agility test, vertical jump test, and 20-m shuttle run test. Of four studies that have tested BFR's affects on sports performance, three of them showed significant improvement in at least one of the aforementioned metrics with use of low loaded BFR when training.

While low-load BFRT has been shown to contribute to muscle development in well-trained athletes, it has been noted that the neural stimulus of the muscle is different than high-load resistance training. A combination of traditional high-load resistance training and low-load BFRT will provide maximal results for athletes.

== Limitations ==
In terms of timing, evidence suggests that utilizing BFR training for the purpose of increasing muscle strength immediately following ACL surgery is inconsistent. The current recommended clinical training load for the post-surgical period to address discrepancies in muscle symmetry is moderate-to-high resistance training. However, training at this intensity may be contraindicated due to postoperative insufficiencies. Some research has indicated potential benefits of BFR training using low load in patients following ACL reconstruction surgery. These benefits include improvements in quadriceps strength and mass, as well as improvements in knee joint pain. As BFR is primarily utilized in the postoperative period, multiple studies have shown inconsistent results of using this technique in physical therapy for muscle strength following ACL reconstruction due to inhibiting factors such as pain/inhibition, kinesiophobia, and various other study methods. Future studies should aim to research the effects of BFR training on individuals post-ACL reconstruction after those postoperative deficiencies have resolved.

== Risks ==
When using belts and lifting straps as a tourniquet, the amount of pressure on the vasculature cannot be controlled and there are reports of rhabdomyolysis cases due to VOT (Vascular Occlusion Training). The original inventor of BFR training, Dr. Yoshiaki Sato, experimented between 1966 and 1973 to understand the precise pressure ranges for people of all ages that were safe and effective. These ranges were later confirmed by cardiologists Toshiaki Nakajima, M.D., Ph.D. and Morita Toshihiro, M.D., Ph.D. at the University of Tokyo Hospital on over 7,000 cardiac rehabilitation subjects between 2004 and 2014.

== See also ==
- Kaatsu
