= Conch =

Shell or sea snails

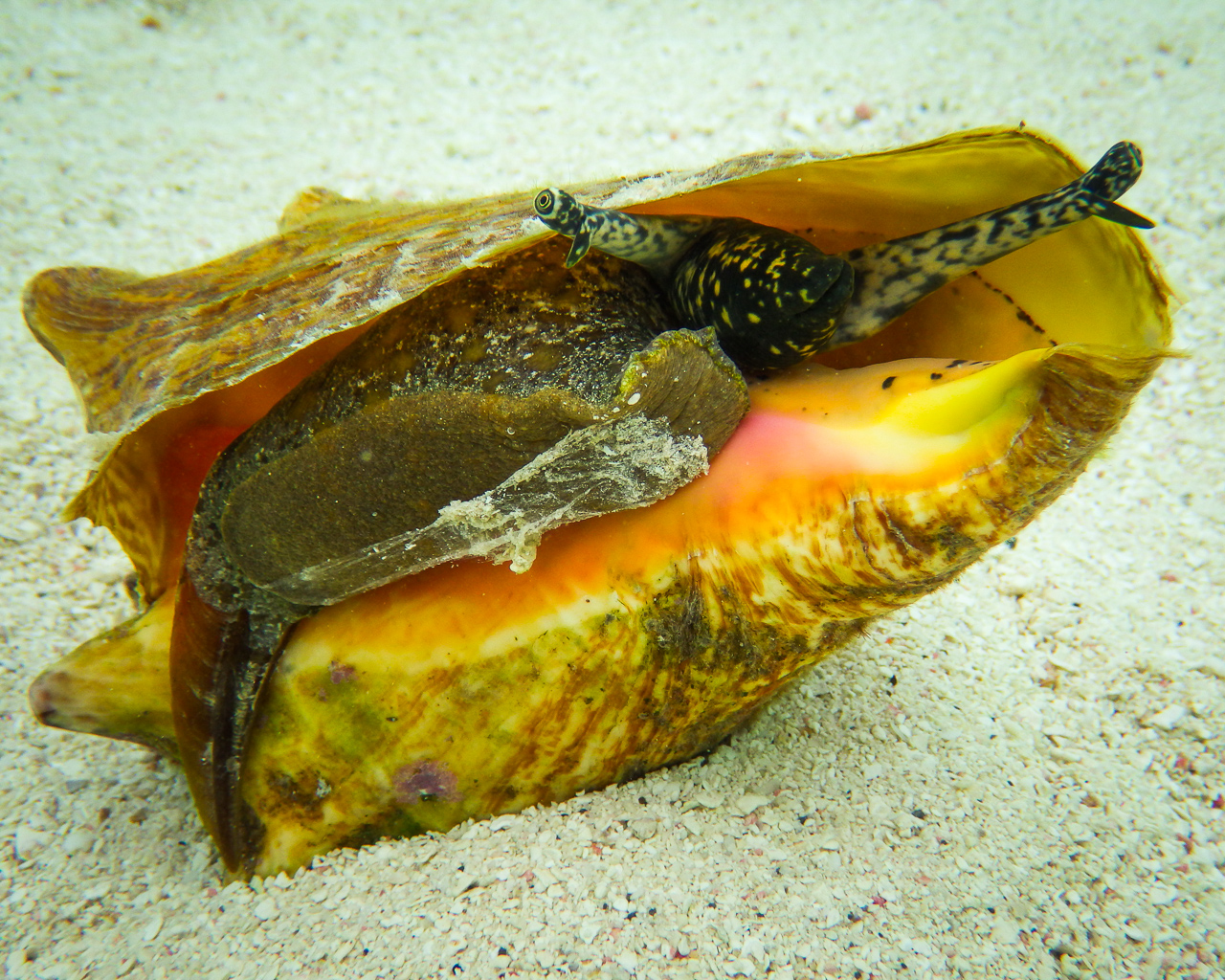
Apertural view of an adult queen conch Aliger gigas with the foot, eyes and snout visible

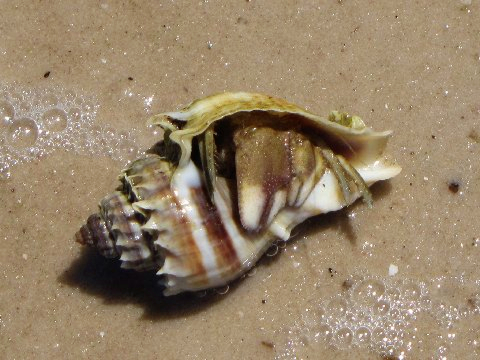
A shell of a dead Florida crown conch Melongena corona inhabited by a hermit crab

Conch (US: /kɑːŋk, kɑːntʃ/ KONK, KONCH, UK: /kɒntʃ/ KONCH) is any of a number of different medium-to-large-sized sea snails. Conch shells typically have a high spire and a noticeable siphonal canal (in other words, the shell comes to a noticeable point on both ends).

Conches that are sometimes referred to as "true conches" are marine gastropods in the family Strombidae, specifically in the genus Strombus and other closely related genera. For example, Aliger gigas, the queen conch, is a true conch. True conches are identified by their long spire.

Many other species are also often called "conch", but are not at all closely related to the family Strombidae, including Melongena species (family Melongenidae) and the horse conch Triplofusus papillosus (family Fasciolariidae). Species commonly referred to as conches also include the sacred chank or shankha shell (Turbinella pyrum) and other Turbinella species in the family Turbinellidae. The Triton's trumpet (family Charoniidae) may also be fashioned into a horn and referred to as a conch.

== Etymology ==
The English word "conch" is attested in Middle English, coming from Latin concha (shellfish, mussel), which in turn comes from Greek konchē (same meaning). Ultimately pre-greek origin. cognate with Sanskrit word śaṅkha.

== General description ==
Conch are species of sea snail in the phylum Mollusca. Their shells consist of about 95% calcium carbonate and 5% organic matter. Conch are harvested for their edible meat and decorative shell. The shells are often used as decoration or as musical instruments.

Queen conch (Aliger gigas) was listed as threatened under the Endangered Species Act in 2024. Due to this threatened classification, commercial or recreational harvesting is illegal in Florida waters and punishable by state law. There are significant conservation efforts underway to help protect this species, including the use of aquaculture to raise them in hatcheries and relocation of conchs to increase mating.

== Culinary use ==
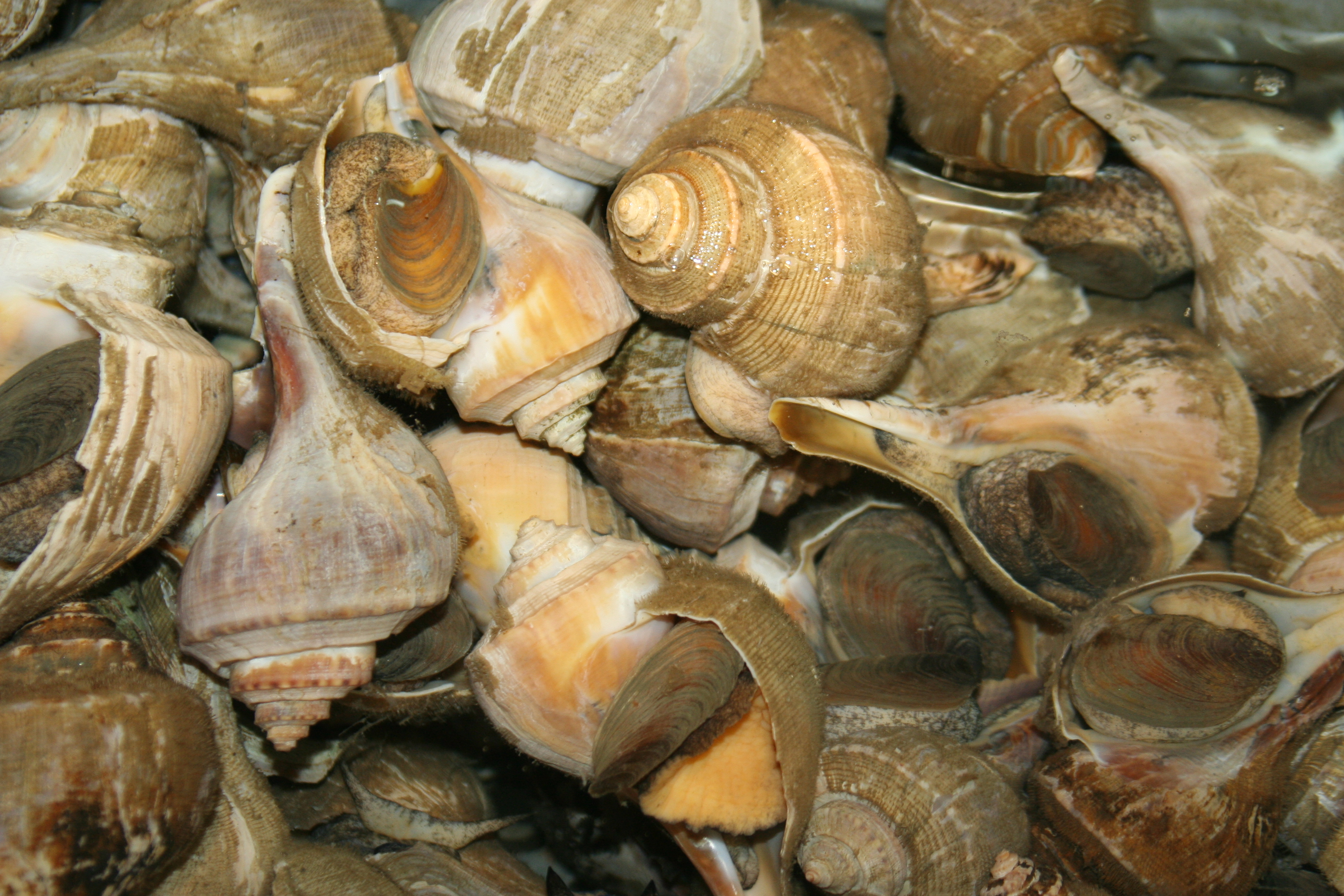
A group of large eastern conches or whelks of the species Busycotypus canaliculatus for sale at a California seafood market

The meat of conches is often eaten raw in salads or cooked in burgers, chowders, fritters, and gumbos. Conch is indigenous to the Caribbean and West Indies. Conch is particularly popular in the Bahamas, Turks and Caicos, and Jamaica. Conch has been widely consumed in the Bahamas—where it is popular cooked into fritters—since the settlement of the islands by the Lucayan people; in recent years, increased harvesting of juveniles has negatively impacted the conch population. In Jamaica conch is eaten in stews and curries. In the Dominican Republic, Grenada, and Haiti, conch is commonly eaten in curries or in a spicy soup. It is locally referred to as lambi. In Puerto Rico, conch is served as a ceviche, often called ensalada de carrucho (conch salad), consisting of raw conch marinated in lime juice, olive oil, vinegar, garlic, green peppers, and onions. It is also used to fill empanadas.

Conch is very popular in Italy and among Italian Americans. Called sconcigli, it is eaten in a variety of ways, but most often in salads or cooked in a sauce for pasta. It is often included as one of the dishes prepared for the Feast of the Seven Fishes.

In East Asian cuisines, conch is often cut into thin slices and then steamed or stir-fried.

Eighty percent of the queen conch meat in international trade is imported into the United States. The Florida Keys were a major source of queen conches until the 1970s, but the conches are now scarce and all harvesting of them in Florida waters is prohibited and individuals who have harvested them have been jailed.

=== Festival ===
In the Turks and Caicos Islands, a Conch Festival is held in November each year at the Three Queens bar/restaurant in Blue Hills. Local restaurateurs compete for the best and most original conch dishes, which are then judged by international chefs. Other competitions, events, and music performances occur.

=== Fritters ===
Conch fritters
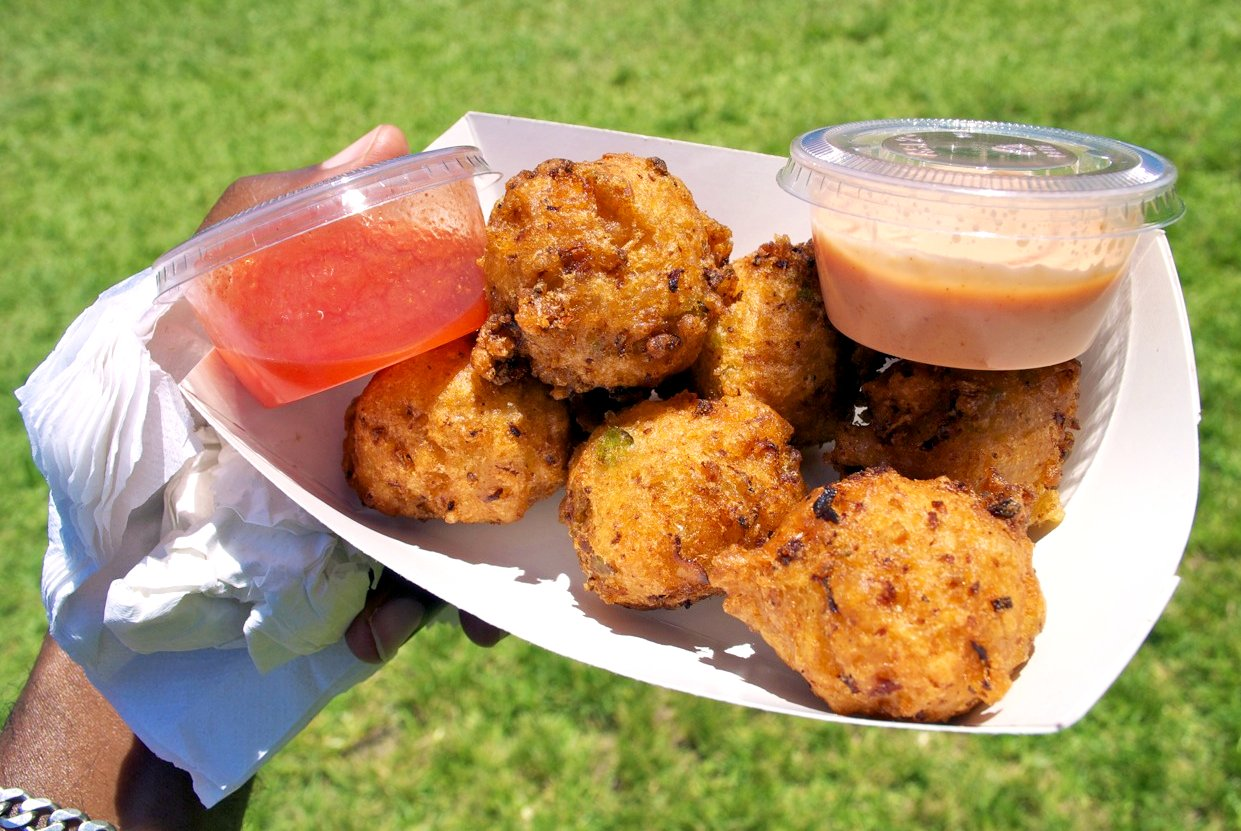
- Conch fritters and dip
- Type: Fritter
- Course: Appetizer
- Region or state: The Bahamas
- Associated cuisine: Bahamian cuisine
- Serving temperature: Hot
- Main ingredients: Conch, cornmeal, diced vegetables

Conch fritters are commonly served in the Bahamas and the Florida Keys. The dish is popular in Bahamian restaurants and was described by Time as "the Bahamas' own original fast food".

They are also popular in Florida, where they are typically served with key lime mustard. The DNA of fried conch fritters exported to Florida from the Bahamas have been analyzed by researchers to study queen conch populations.

The meat of a conch is minced before cooking to tenderize it. The mince is then mixed into a seasoned fritter batter made of cornmeal, chopped vegetables, typically including onions, bell peppers, celery and jalapeños. Lemon juice, tomato paste, black pepper and creole seasoning are commonly used. The batter mixture is then formed into balls and deep-fried. They are served with various dipping sauces, such as cocktail sauce, mayonnaise or ketchup.

== Musical instruments ==
Conch shells can be used as wind instruments. They are prepared by cutting a hole in the spire of the shell near the apex and then blowing into the shell as if it were a trumpet, as a blowing horn. Sometimes a mouthpiece is used, but some shell trumpets are blown without one. Pitch is adjusted by moving one's hand in and out of the aperture; the deeper the hand, the lower the note.

Various species of large marine gastropod shells can be turned into blowing shells, but some of the best-known species used are the sacred chank or shankha Turbinella pyrum, the Triton's trumpet Charonia tritonis, and the queen conch Strombus gigas.

One of the most famous musical instruments was found in the Marsoulas cave in the Pyrenees Mountains, in France, in 1932. CT scans showed how ancient humans adapted the Conch to make it a musical instrument, such as creating a mouthpiece that was held together by an organic matter like clay or wax. Researchers from the Sorbonne, together with a professional horn player, were able to use it again as a musical instrument and play it.

Examples of this practice in the Americas can be seen in the form of historical artifacts at the Museo Larco in Lima, Peru, and Museo Nacional de Antropología in Mexico City, Mexico.

== Pearls ==
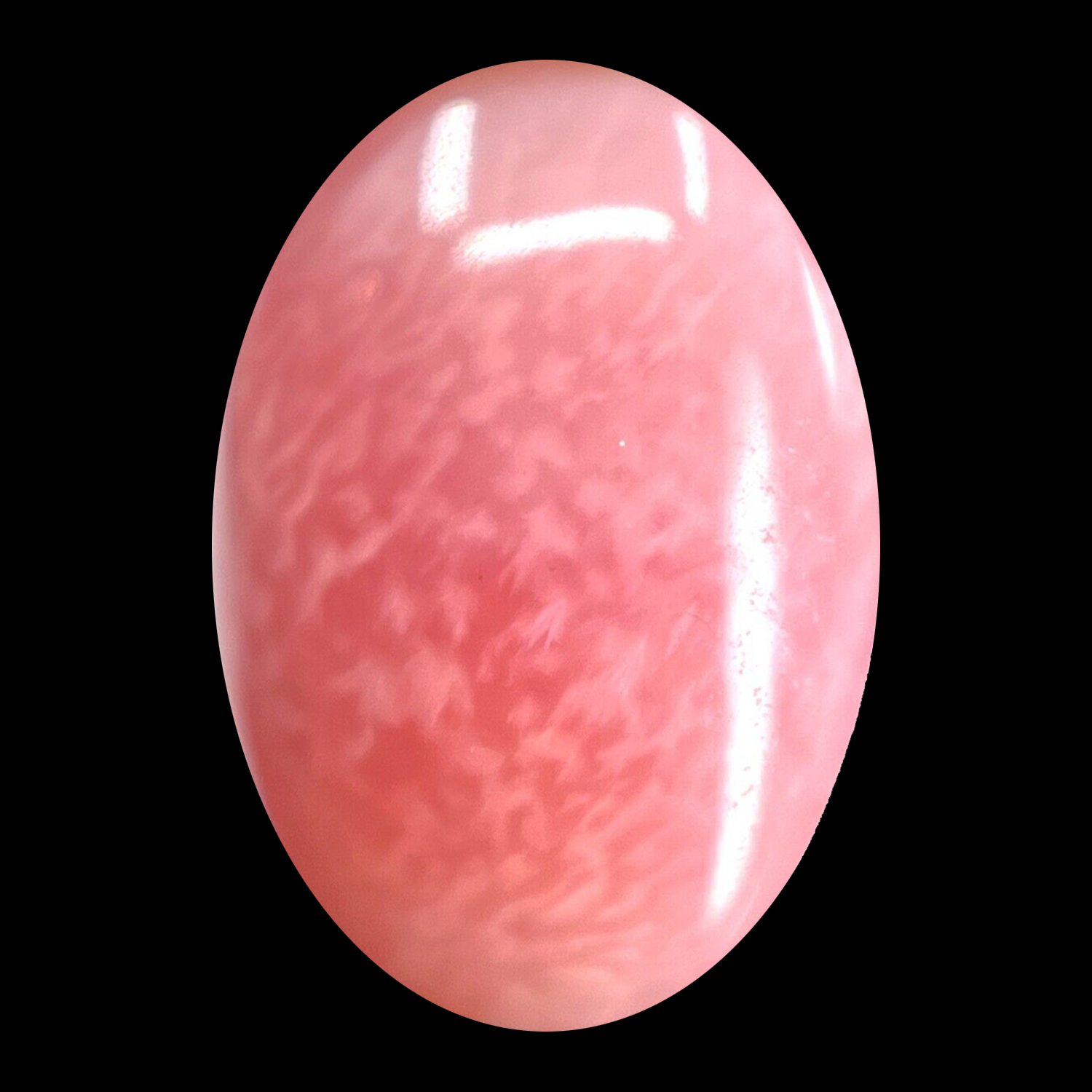
A conch pearl displaying flame patterning.

Many kinds of molluscs can produce pearls. Pearls from the queen conch, S. gigas, are rare and have been collector's items since Victorian times. Conch pearls occur in a range of hues, including white, brown, and orange, with many intermediate shades, but pink is the colour most associated with the conch pearl, such that these pearls are sometimes referred to simply as "pink pearls". In some gemological texts, non-nacreous gastropod pearls used to be referred to as "calcareous concretions" because they were porcellaneous (shiny and ceramic-like in appearance), rather than nacreous (with a pearly luster). The Gemological Institute of America and World Jewellery Confederation now use the simple term "pearl"—or, where appropriate, the more-descriptive term "non-nacreous pearl"—for such items, and, under Federal Trade Commission rules, various mollusk pearls may be referred to as "pearls" without qualification.

Although not nacreous, the surfaces of fine conch pearls have a unique appearance. The microstructure of conch pearls comprises partly aligned bundles of microcrystalline fibers that create a shimmering, slightly iridescent effect known as flame structure. The effect is a form of chatoyancy, caused by the interaction of light rays with the microcrystals in the pearl's surface, and it somewhat resembles moiré silk.

== Other uses ==
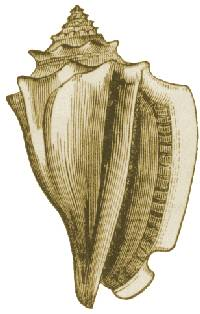
A drawing of the shell of Strombus alatus, the Florida fighting conch

- Conch shells are used as biologically grown calcium carbonate fertilizer.
- Conch shells are sometimes used as decoration, as decorative planters, and in cameo making.
- In the Aztec culture, the conch played an important role in rituals, war, art, music, mythology, festivals, and even the calendar.
- In India, some artisans make souvenirs, deity idols and other crafts by carving natural conch shells by hands.
- Conch shells have been used as shell money in several cultures.
- Some American Aboriginals used cylindrical conch columella beads as part of breastplates and other personal adornment.
- In India, the Bengali Hindus bride-to-be is adorned with conch shell and coral bangles called shakha pola. It is a traditional wedding ritual for every Bengali bride.
- In India and Bangladesh, the conch is blown every day in the evening in Bengali Hindus houses as a daily ritual.
- In some Afro-Caribbean and African-American cemeteries, conch shells are placed on graves.
- In some Caribbean countries such as Jamaica and the Bahamas, cleaned queen conch shells, or polished fragments, are sold, mainly to tourists, as souvenirs or in jewellery. Responding to a 2003 recommendation from CITES, some countries in the Caribbean have banned the export of queen conch shells. CITES has also asked all countries to ban import of these shells from countries that are not complying with CITES recommendations for managing the fishery. Queen conch fisheries have been closed in several countries. Conch shells or fragments taken home by tourists from noncomplying countries may be confiscated on return to the tourist's home country while clearing customs. In the UK, conch shells are the 9th-most seized import.
- Conch shells have been used as a building material since ancient times, and new research is being conducted, to replicate their material for practical uses such as bone replacement, and also in architecture, to construct stronger structures.
- In Grenada, fishermen use the conch shell as a trombone to announce to the community that fish is available for sale. Conchs are used at carnival times in the Jouvert Jump where Diab Diab (Jab Jab) blow conch shells as part of the festivities. Especially in Guadeloupe, hearing conch shells being blown near ports at dawn and during Carnival times, too, is not uncommon. Many bands and trumpeters like Steve Turre use the conch shell in their performances.
- In the Caribbean, broken or up-turned conch shells are embedded into the tops of outdoor walls in an effort to maintain home security.
- In Tamil Nadu, India, the conch horn is blown during funerals as an acoustic indication of the funeral and to ward off evil spirits.
- In Key West, Florida, US, a native-born resident is affectionately called a "conch".
- In Japan, a conch is horagai (or jinkai). It was used as a trumpet in special ceremonies such as a royal cremation during the Edo period.
- Conch shells, (pu in Hawaiian) have been historically used as a method of communication, a tradition that is still observed in parts of modern life in Hawai'i.

== Religion ==
=== Ancient Peru ===
The Moche people of ancient Peru worshipped the sea and often depicted conch shells in their art.

=== Aztec ===
Quetzalcoatl, the Aztec god of wind and learning, wears around his neck the "wind breastplate" ehecailacocozcatl, "the spirally voluted wind jewel" made of a conch shell. Blowing a conch was considered a religious act.

=== Hinduism ===
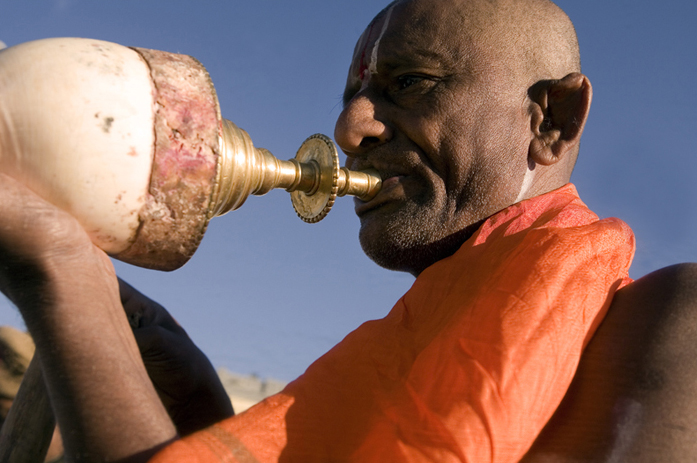
A Hindu priest blowing a shankha (a shell of Turbinella pyrum) during a puja

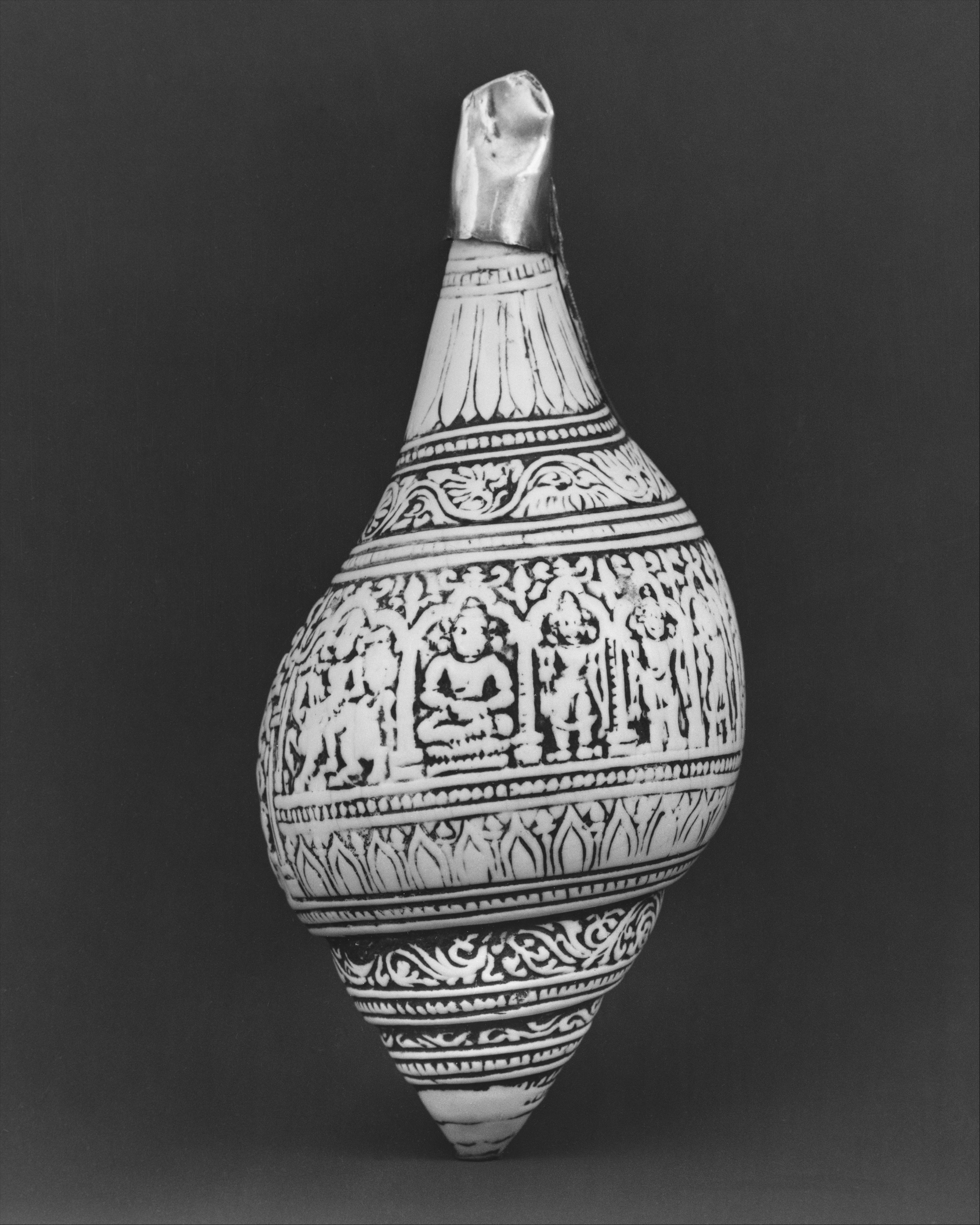
Ancient india, carved conch with Lakshmi-Narayana, 11th–12th century

A shankha shell (the shell of a T. pyrum, a species in the gastropod family Turbinellidae) is often referred to in the West as a conch shell or a chank shell. This shell is used as an important ritual object in Hinduism. The shell is used as a ceremonial trumpet, as part of religious practices, for example puja. The chank trumpet is sounded during worship at specific points, accompanied by ceremonial bells and singing. As it is an auspicious instrument, it is of purity and brilliance (Om, Devas, Brahman the Almighty Supreme creator, referred to in mantras, the Gayatri mantra explains a meditation on the brilliance of the sun), it is often played in a Lakshmi puja in temple or at home.

In the story of Dhruva, the divine conch plays a special part. The warriors of ancient India blew conch shells to announce battle, as is described in the beginning of the war of Kurukshetra, in the Hindu epic the Mahabharata.

The god of preservation, Vishnu, is said to hold a special conch, Panchajanya, that represents life, as it has come out of life-giving waters. According to Hindu mythology, Devas (gods) and Asuras (demons) once decided to churn the ocean to get a special divine nectar. This divine nectar, also known as amrit, was known to give immortality to whoever drank it. All the gods were on one side of it and the demons were on the other end. The churning (samudra manthan) produced a number of things from the ocean. One of the first things to come out of it was lethal poison called halahala. Everyone was terrified, as the poison was potent enough to destroy entire creation, so they went to Lord Shiva for protection and he consumed the poison to safeguard the universe. Lord Shiva took the poison in his mouth, but did not swallow it. Shankha also was one of divine objects that was obtained from samudra manthan.

Also, the sound of the conch is believed to drive away the evil spirits.

The blowing of the conch or "the shankha" needs a tremendous power and respiratory capacity. Hence, blowing it daily helps keep the lungs healthy.

A newlywed Bengali bride wears bangles called shakha paula, made from coral and conch-shell powder. They have been a part of Bengali custom and tradition. In an ancient era, the Bengali farming community is thought to have resided near the river. They collected conch shells and powdered them to create bangles. They also used red coral for the bangles. They gave these beautiful bangles to their wives, as they could not afford ivory bangles. They were also known as poor-man's ivory, as they were cheap substitute for ivory bangles.

==== Literature and the oral tradition ====
- In the Hindu tradition, the conch shell is used in ceremony as the sound it makes is said to correspond with higher frequency universal sounds associated with music of the spheres.

== Architecture ==
See semi-dome, also called conch and often shaped as a scallop shell.

== In popular culture ==
In Lord of the Flies, a group of boys stranded on an uninhabited island use a conch shell to gather for meetings, and only the person holding it is allowed to speak. The conch comes to represent structure, democracy, and civilization. Its destruction later in the story marks the complete breakdown of order and the boys' descent into savagery.

== See also ==
- Dakshinavarti shankha
- Lentigo pipus
- Seashell
- Seashell resonance
