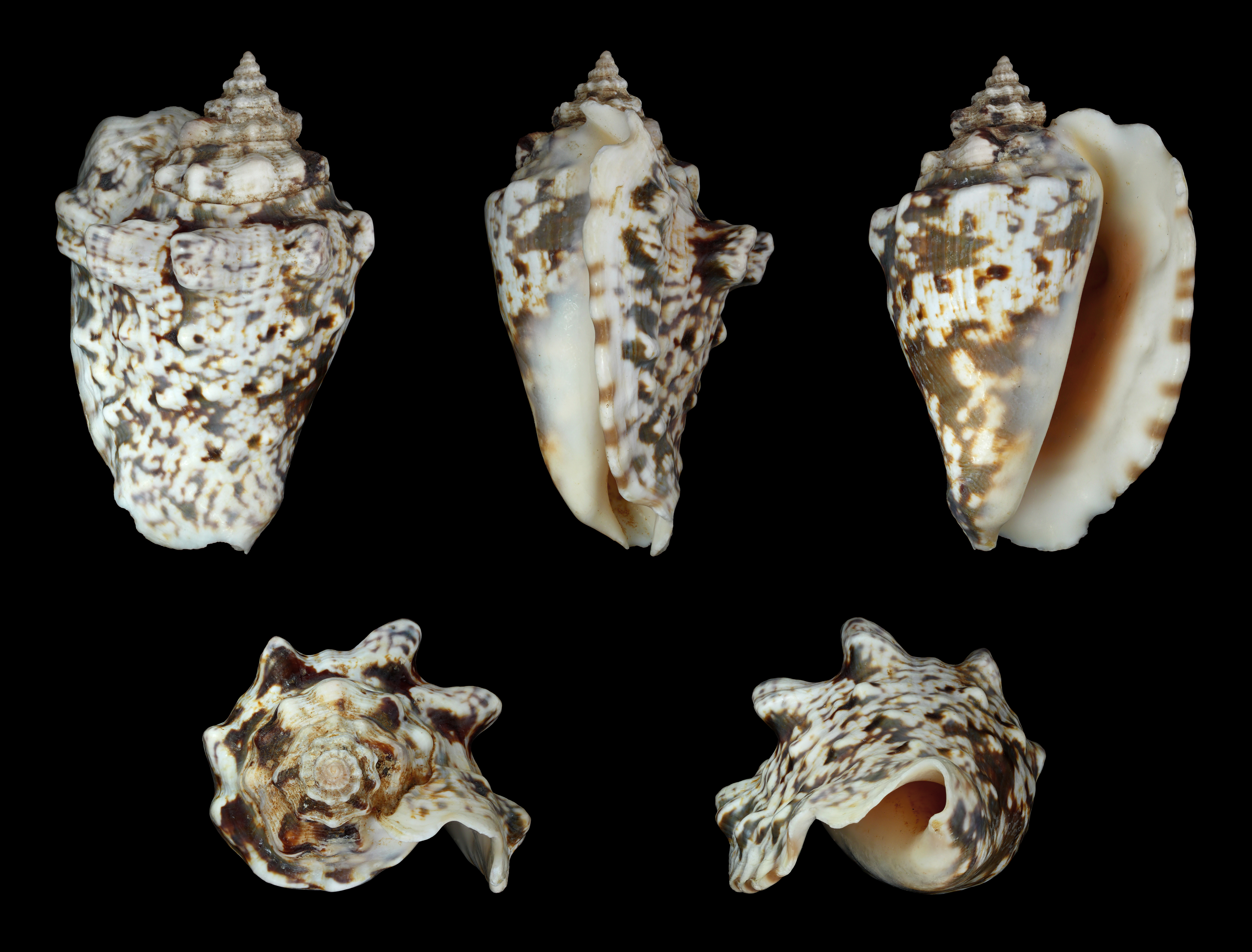
- Five views of a shell of the silver conch, Lentigo lentiginosus

Scientific classification
- Kingdom: Animalia
- Phylum: Mollusca
- Class: Gastropoda
- Subclass: Caenogastropoda
- Order: Littorinimorpha
- Family: Strombidae
- Genus: Lentigo
- Species: L. lentiginosus

Binomial name
- Lentigo lentiginosus (Linnaeus, 1758)

Synonyms
- Lambis rana Röding, 1798; Strombus lentiginosus Linnaeus, 1758 (basionym)

= Lentigo lentiginosus =

Species of gastropod

Lentigo lentiginosus, the silver conch, is a species of medium-sized sea snail, a marine gastropod mollusc in the family Strombidae, the true conchs.

== Shell description ==
The maximum shell length of this species is 100 mm, but more commonly it grows up to 75 mm.

As is the case in many strombids, the adult shell of Lentigo lentiginosus is very heavy and thick, with a characteristic deep stromboid notch, and a flared, very thick and posteriorly expanded outer lip. The columella is anteriorly projected, and the siphonal canal is convex. The body whorl has a notably irregular surface, which is ornamented by spiral cords and rows of blunt tubercles that form elevated knobs on the shoulder. The inner lip is smooth, with a large callus that often spreads over the spire and over the body whorl. The shell has a tall spire, and each whorl of the spire has a row of heavy knobs and groves that nearly completely fold over each other. The shell color is usually white with large irregular brown blotches and dots occurring at intervals over the shell surface. The columellar callus has a characteristic faint silvery gloss. The lateral margin of the outer lips has a series of tan blotches. The aperture is pink to orange on the interior, becoming paler towards the margins.

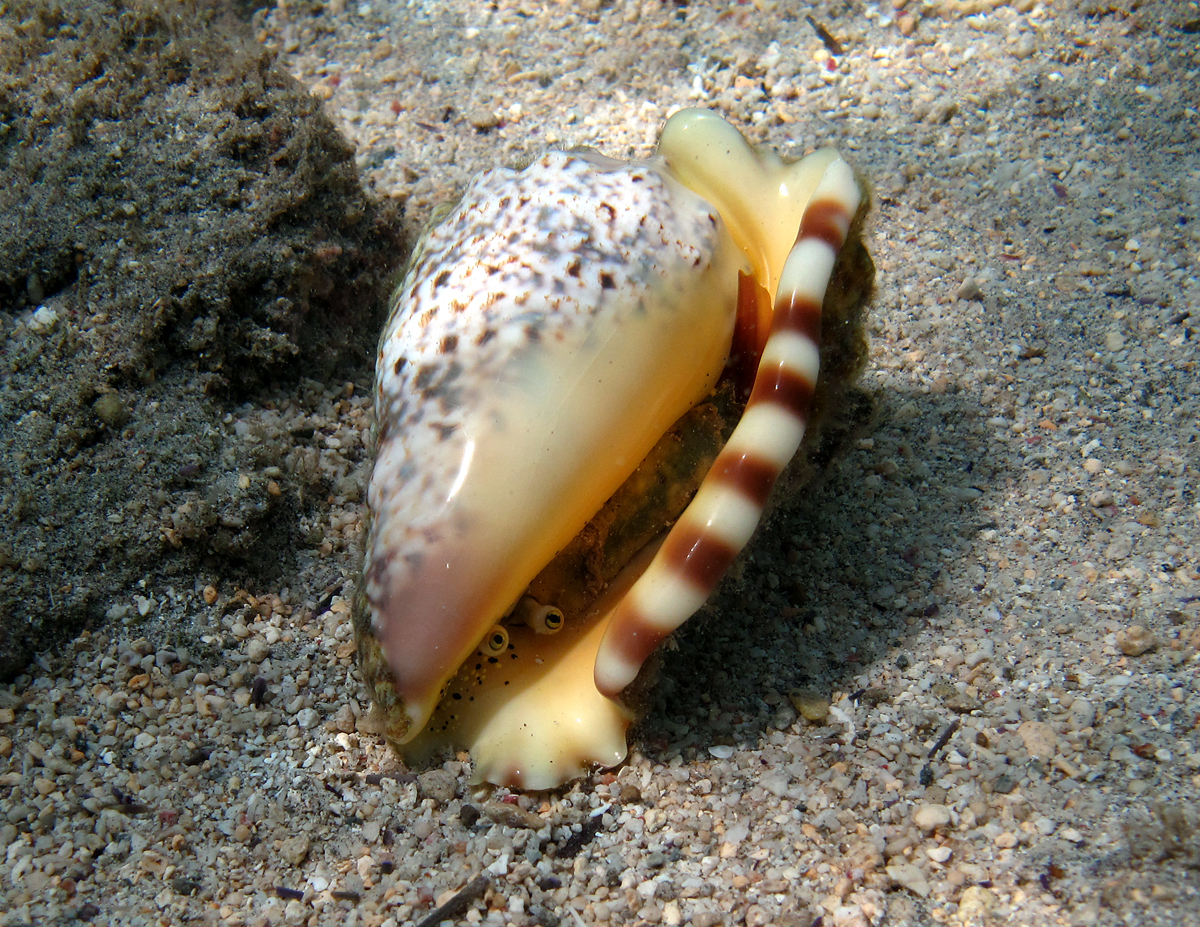
Alive on la Réunion

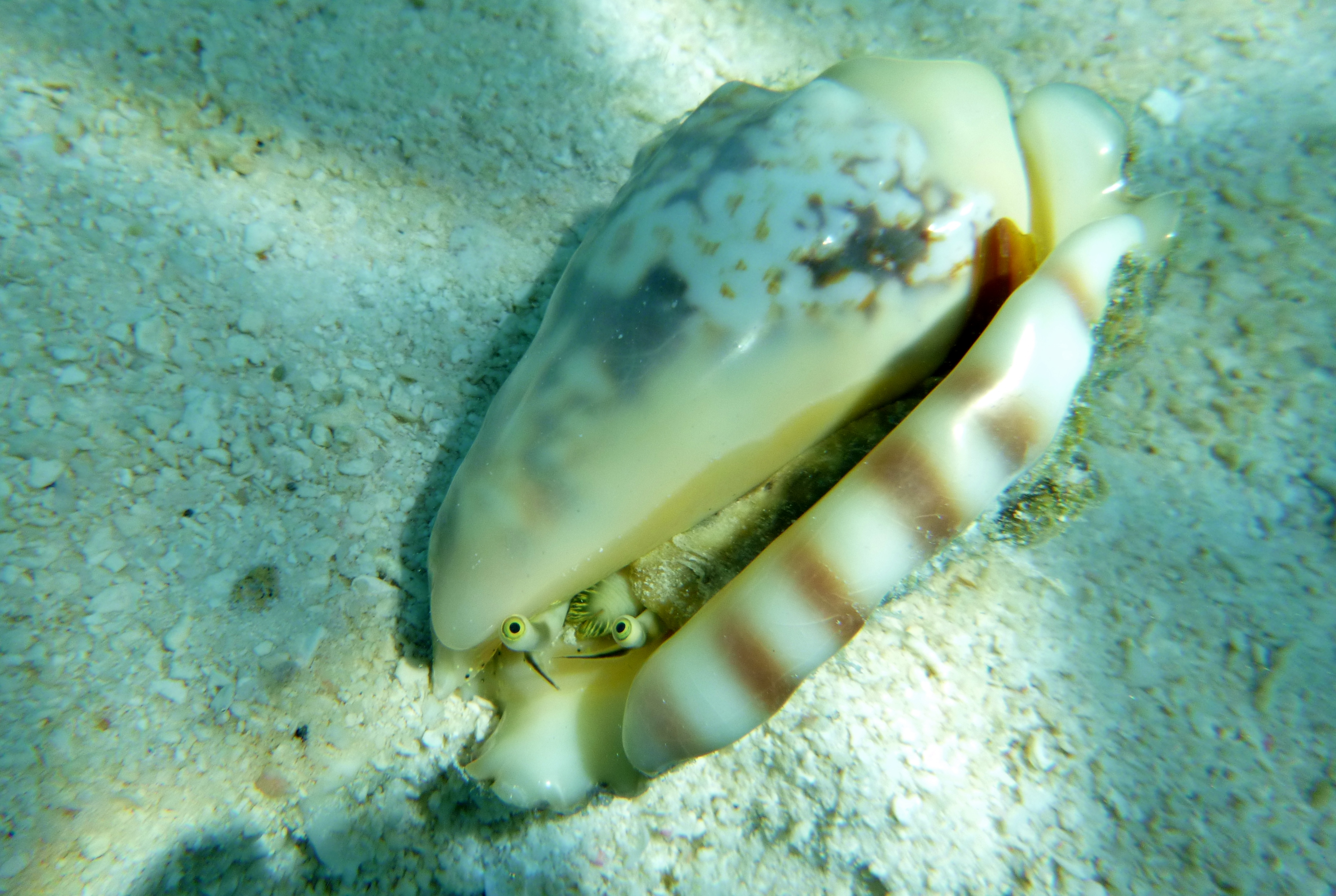
On the Maldives

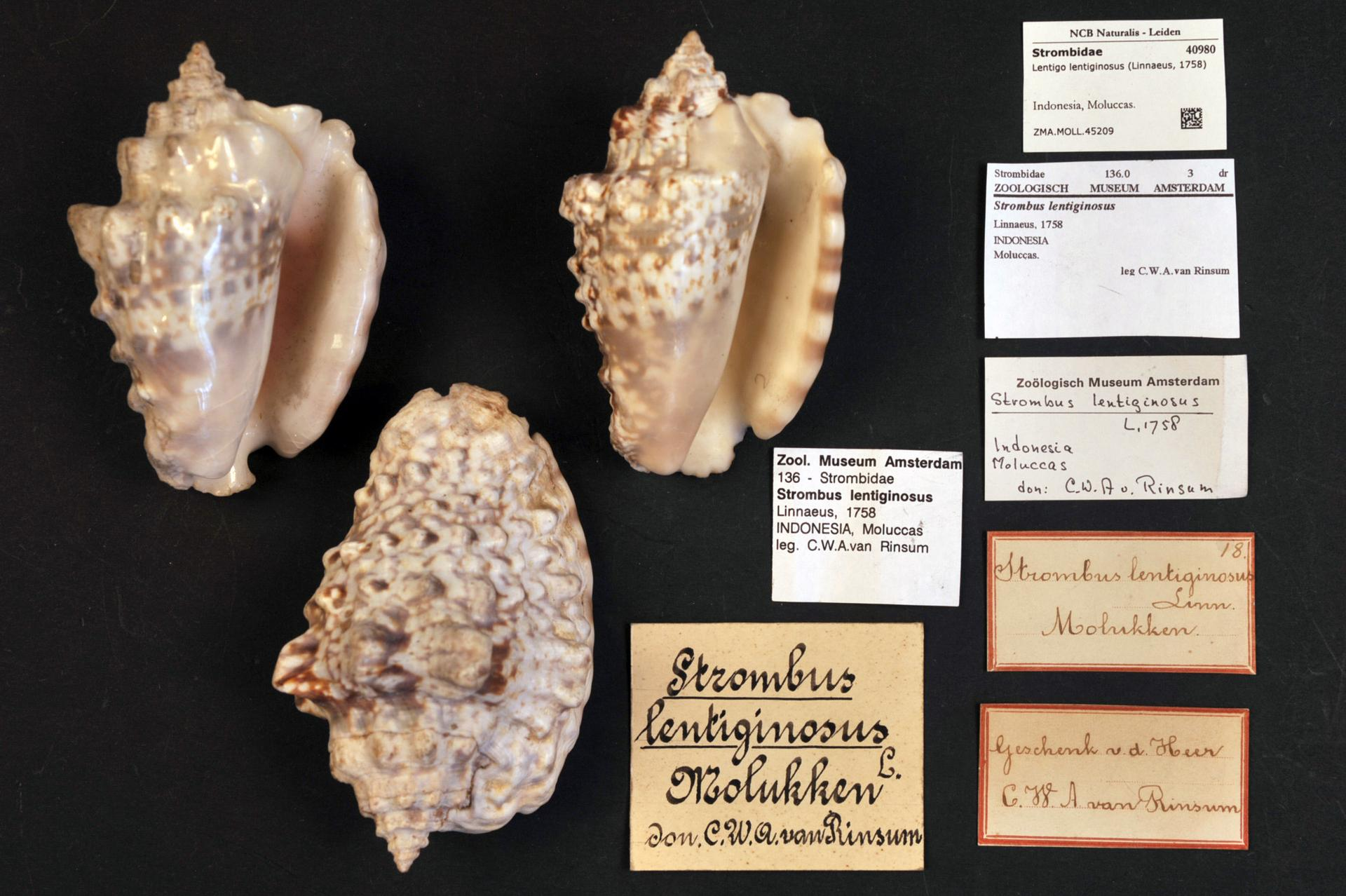
In a museum

== Distribution ==
Lentigo lentiginosus is widespread in the Indo-Pacific, from East Africa, including Aldabra, Madagascar, Mauritius and Tanzania to eastern Polynesia, and also in southern Japan and northern Australia.

== Ecology ==
=== Habitat ===
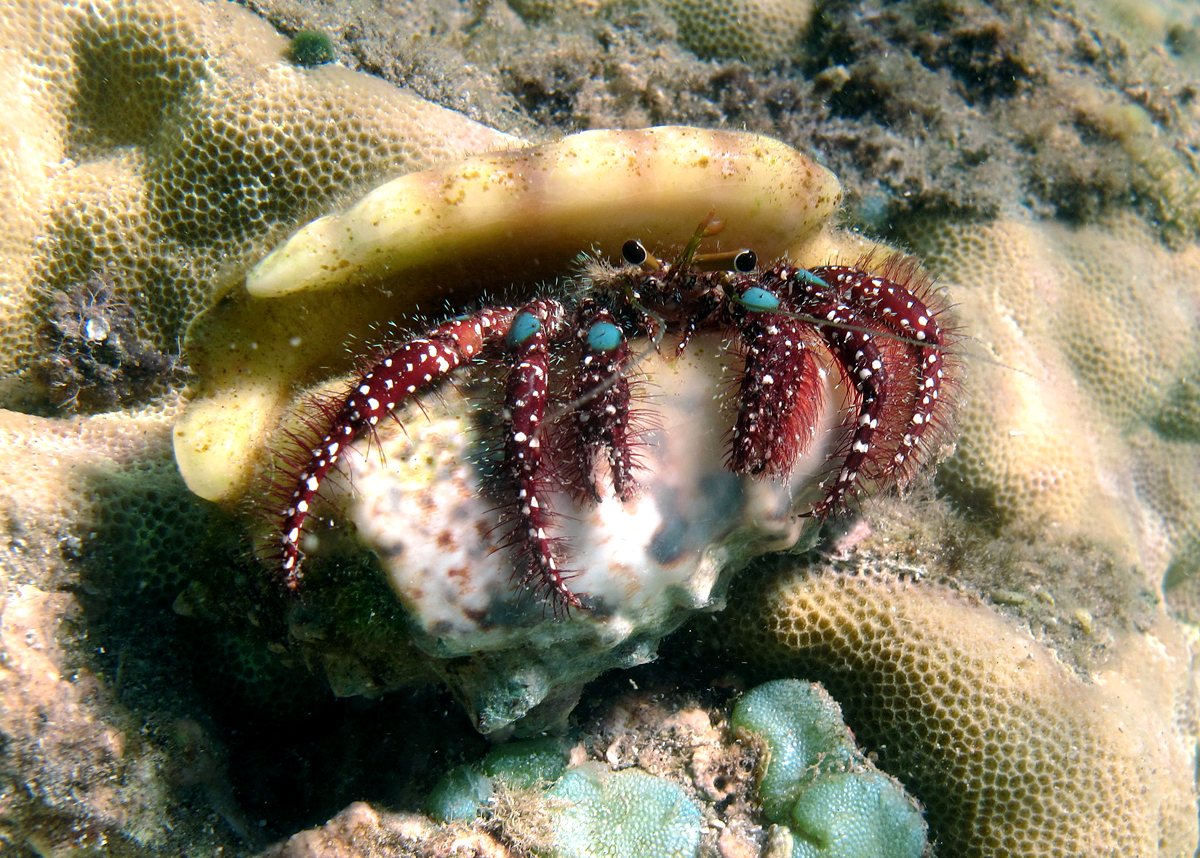
The hermit crab Dardanus guttatus occupying an empty shell of L. lentiginosus

The silver conch lives on coral and sandy bottoms in clear water. It is commonly found on barrier or lagoon reefs, in intertidal and shallow subtidal zones to a depth of around 4 m. It is rarely seen buried in the sand.

=== Feeding habits ===
Like the other species that used to be included in the genus Strombus, L. lentiginosus is known to be a herbivore.

== Human uses ==
The flesh of Lentigo lentiginosus is edible, and it is locally collected for food. The shell is used in shellcraft, and is commonly sold in local markets around the central Philippines.
