= Meat grinder =

Kitchen appliance

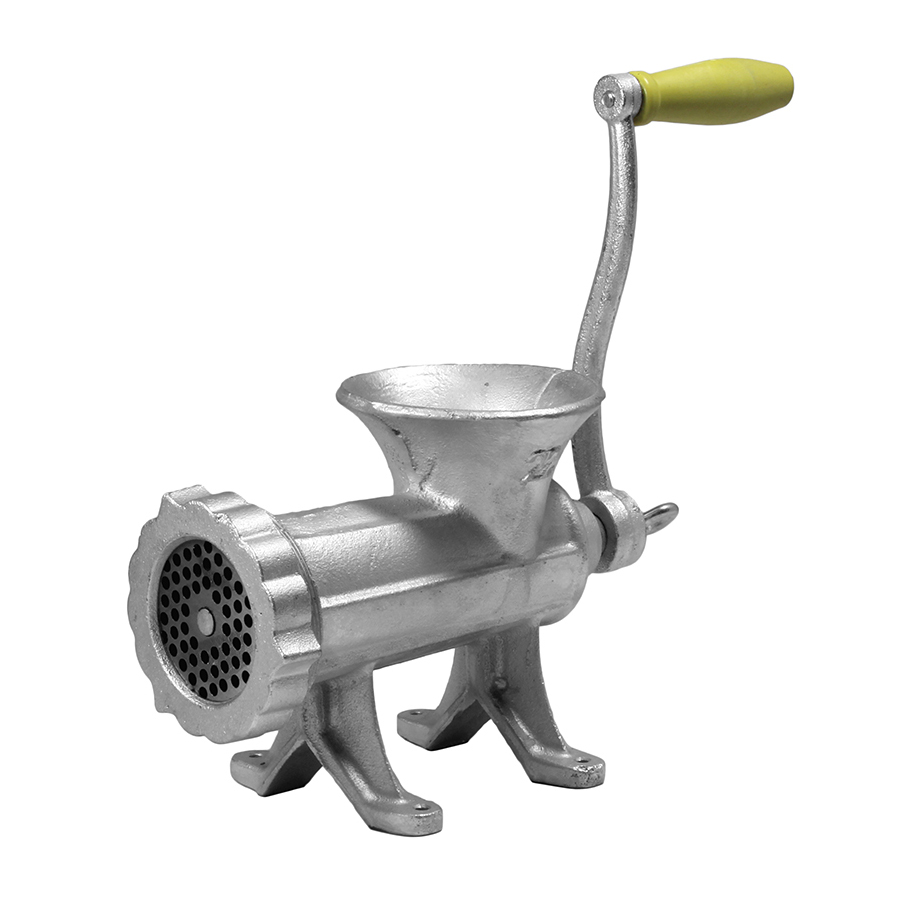
Modern hand food grinder (Alfa Inc)

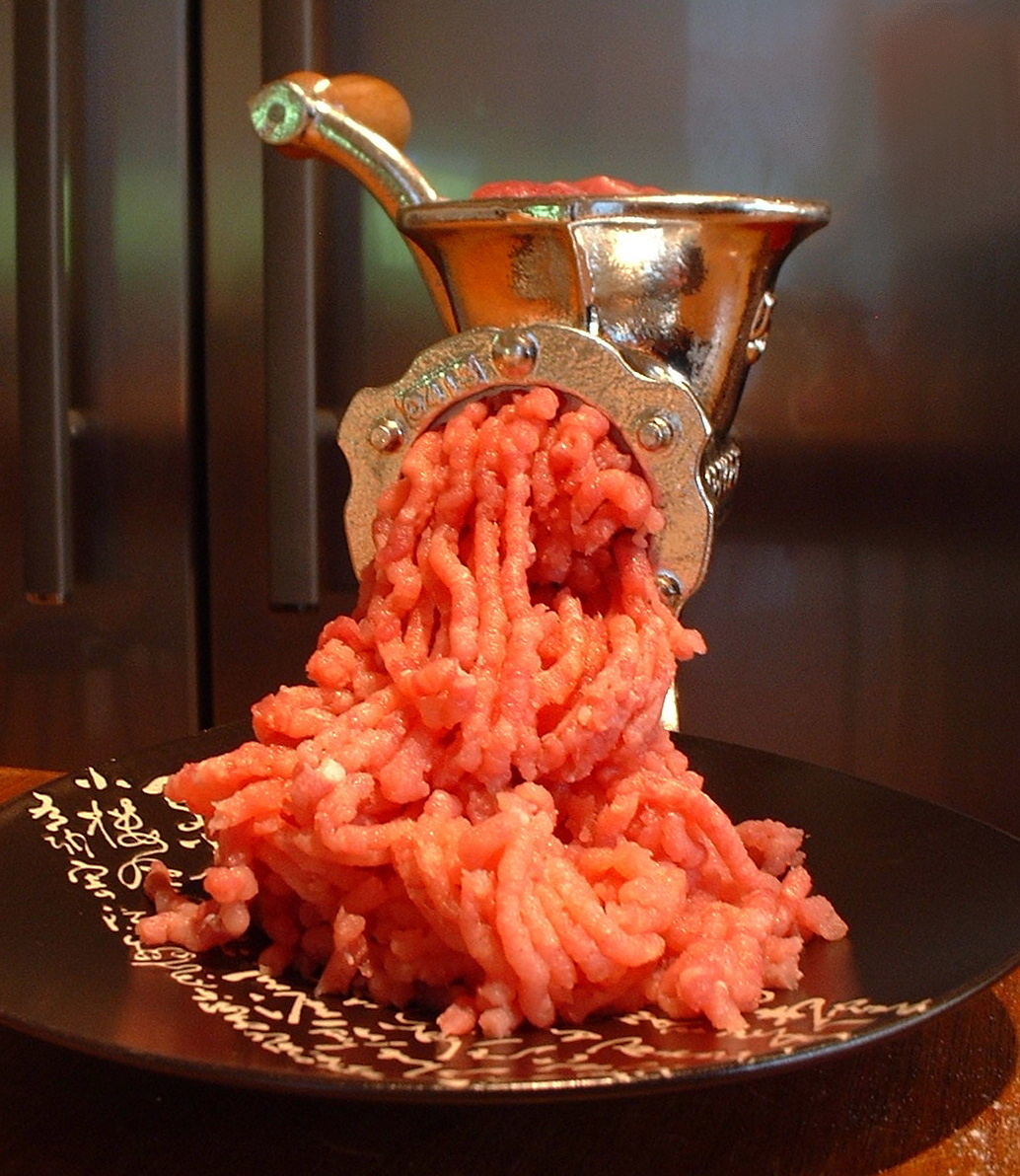
A meat grinder in operation

A meat grinder (also called a "meat mincer" in the UK) is a kitchen appliance for mincing (UK) or grinding (US) meat, fish, vegetables and other foods, raw or cooked. It replaces tools like the mincing knife. The food to be minced is placed into a funnel on the top of the grinder. From there, the material enters a horizontal screw conveyor, which may be hand-cranked or motorized. The screw compresses the food against a set of knives pressing against a fixed plate with holes in it. The fineness of the mince depends on the size of the holes.

By changing the hole plate it is also possible to produce breadcrumbs or fill sausage casing. After the drop from the retainer, it is possible to change the hole plate. By removing the fixing screw the grinder can be disassembled completely for cleaning. Besides the domestic manually or motor operated grinders, there are also grinders for butchery (table- or shop-grinders for example) and for the food industry. Some large machines are able to produce several tons per hour.

== History ==
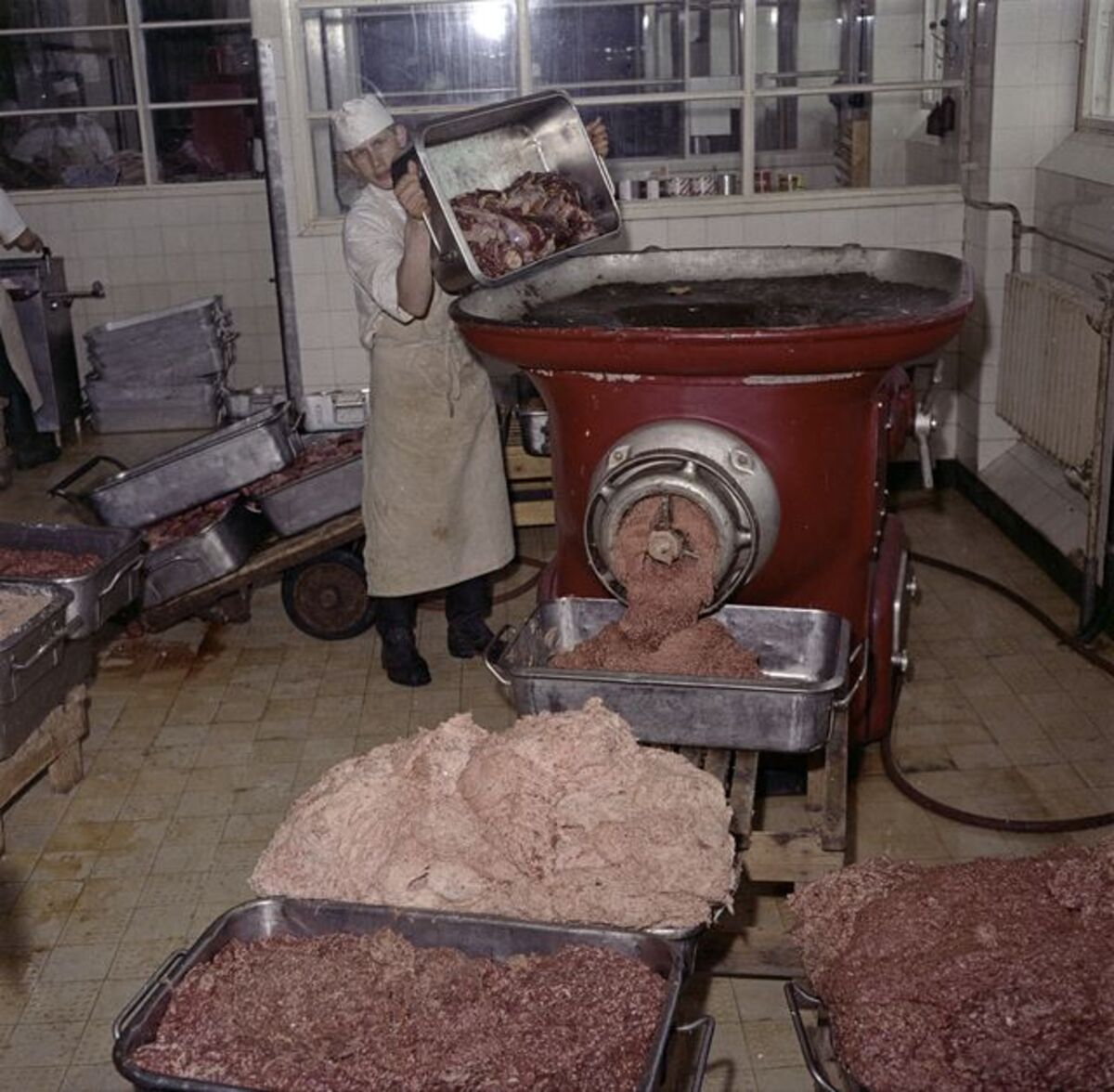
An employee pours meat into a meat grinder at a slaughterhouse in Pori, Finland in 1958

The first meat grinder was invented in the nineteenth century by Karl Drais. The earliest form of the meat grinder was hand-cranked and forced meat into a metal plate that had several small holes, resulting in long, thin strands of meat.

Manufacturers developed powered machines as electricity became more accessible, and modern electric meat grinders can process several pounds of meat easily and uniformly. Some models have different attachments to add functionality, such as sausage-making, kibbe, and juicing, which have greatly broadened the way meat grinders are used.

== Mixer unit ==
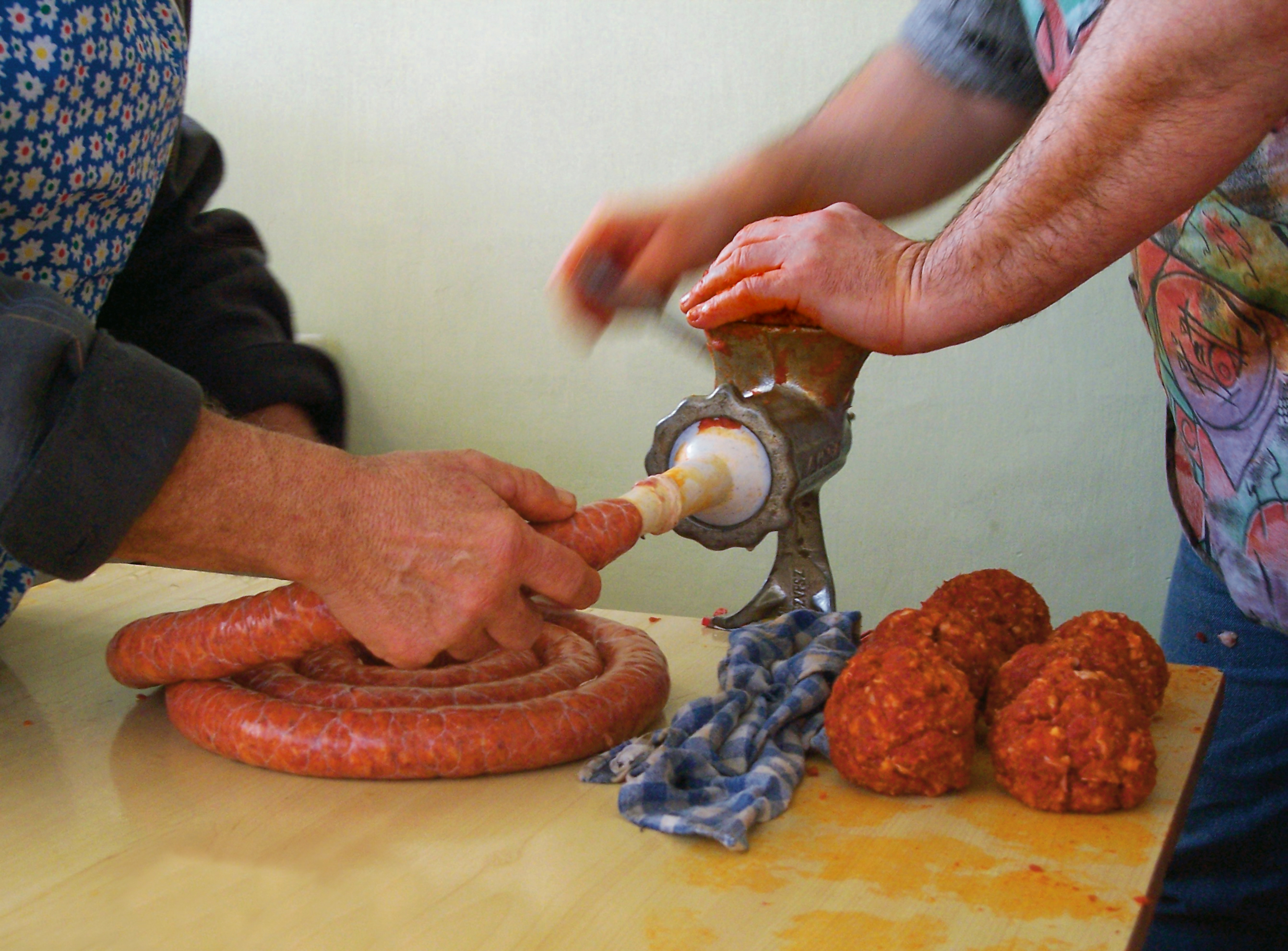
An example of sausage making with a meat grinder

A basic optional feature for larger grinders is the mixer unit. With this unit different kinds of meat (for example beef or pork) can be mixed with each other homogeneously and/or the meat can be mixed with additives, like salt or spices, before grinding it. Without such a mixer unit, the additives must be mixed into the meat after grinding it, which adversely affects the taste and appearance of most products. Salt is used especially to reduce the concentration of bacteria which preserves it for a longer time and gives a salty taste.

== Commercial vs. home use ==
Commercial meat grinders are used to process thousands of pounds of meat per hour. Frozen meat grinders can process frozen blocks of meat, down to –25 °C. The frozen blocks can range from 90×50×15 cm to 90×50×20 cm, and the force applied from 80,000 newtons (18,000 lbf) to 120,000 newtons (27,000 lbf).

There are two different drive forms used in industrial meat grinders, a single-rev drive, which is ideal to grind frozen meat blocks using a single auger, and a two-rev drive, which pushes the product through a cutting knife using an auger and then through a perforated plate.

The frozen meat gets pushed by the auger into the star-shaped cutting blade. Once it has been cut, it gets pushed through a second cutting surface, the plate. The plate will further reduce the size of the product and will remove/break up any fat deposits.

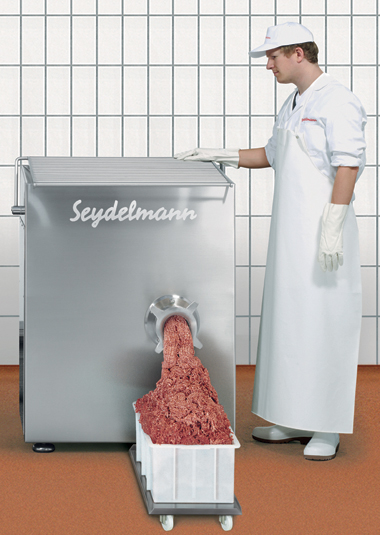
Automatic grinder AD 114

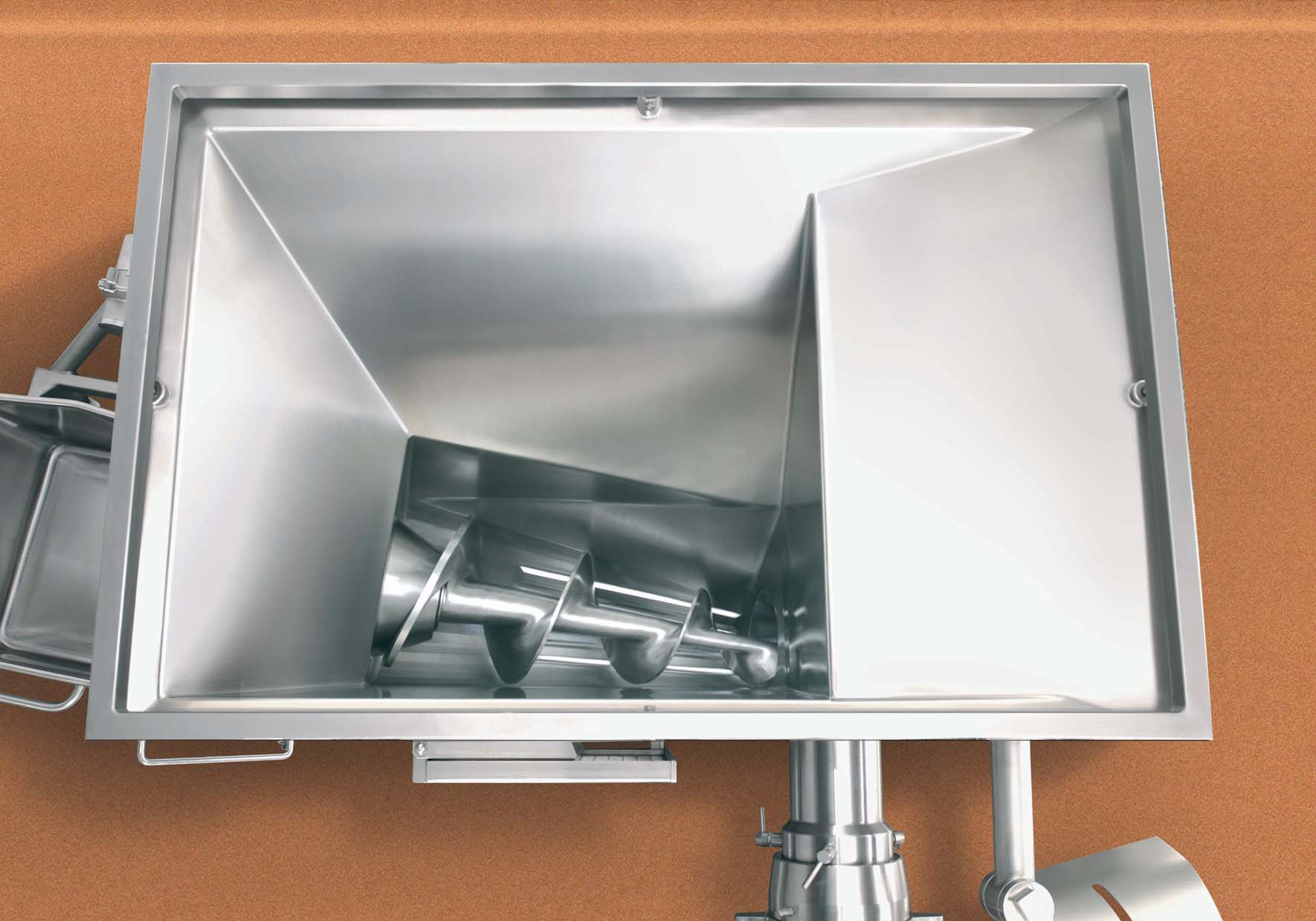
Feed hopper with the conveying screw of AU 200

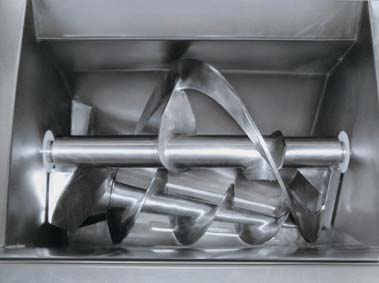
Mixer of AM130

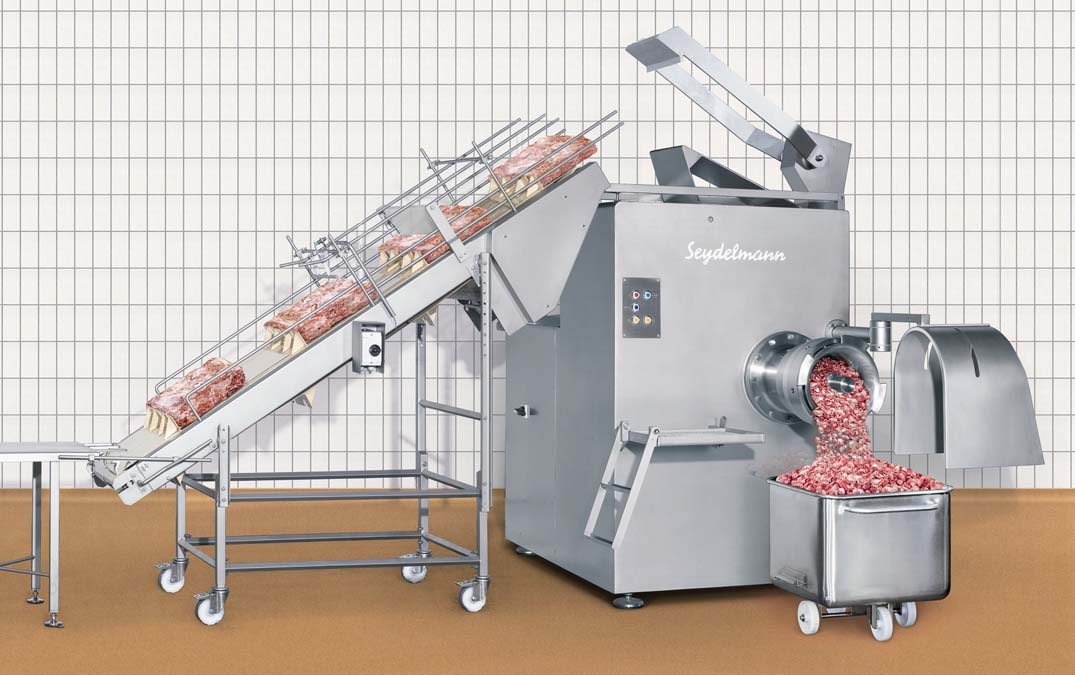
Frozen meat grinder GW 300

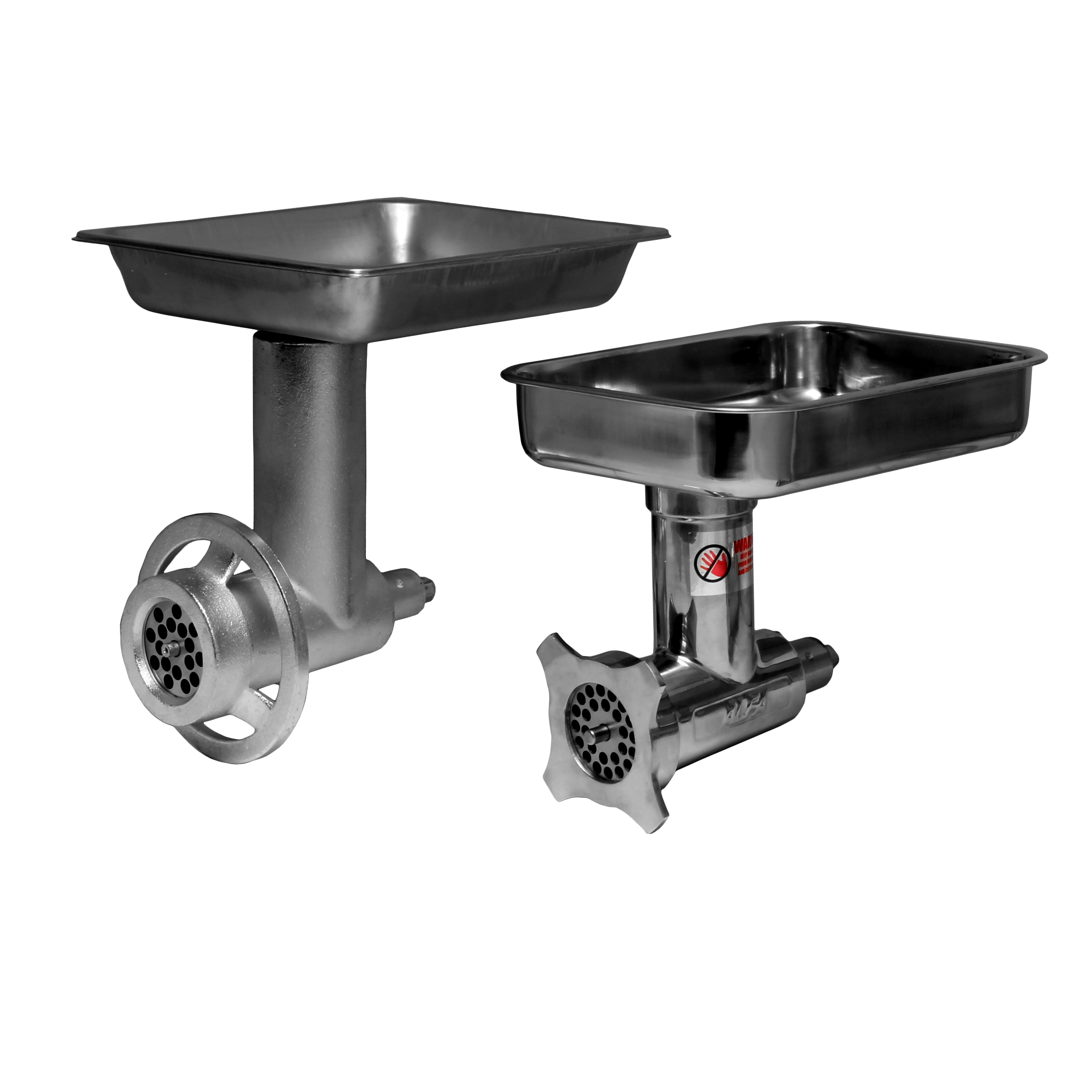
Alfa 12 SS and 12 H CCA meat grinder attachments

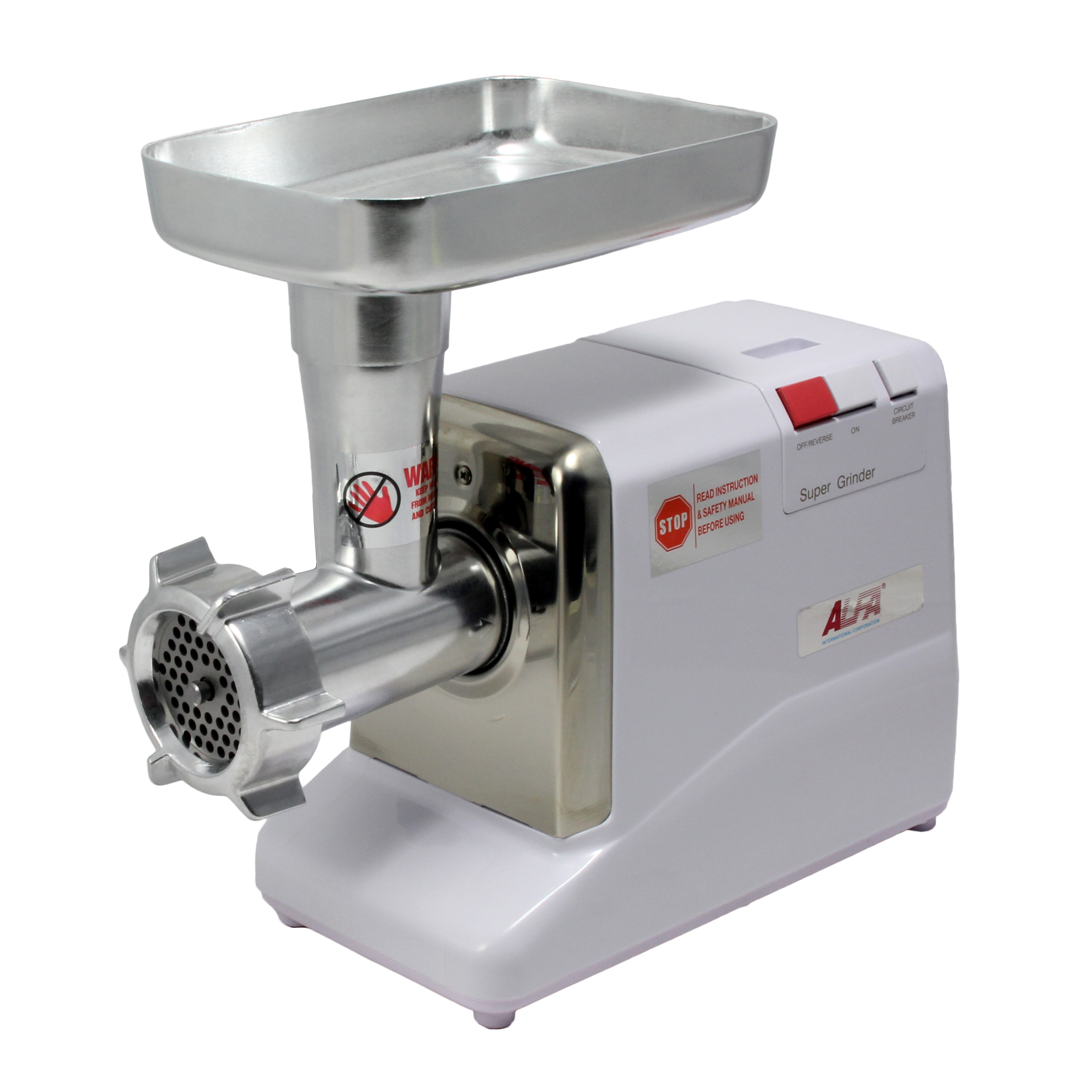
Alfa MC5 stand-alone meat grinder

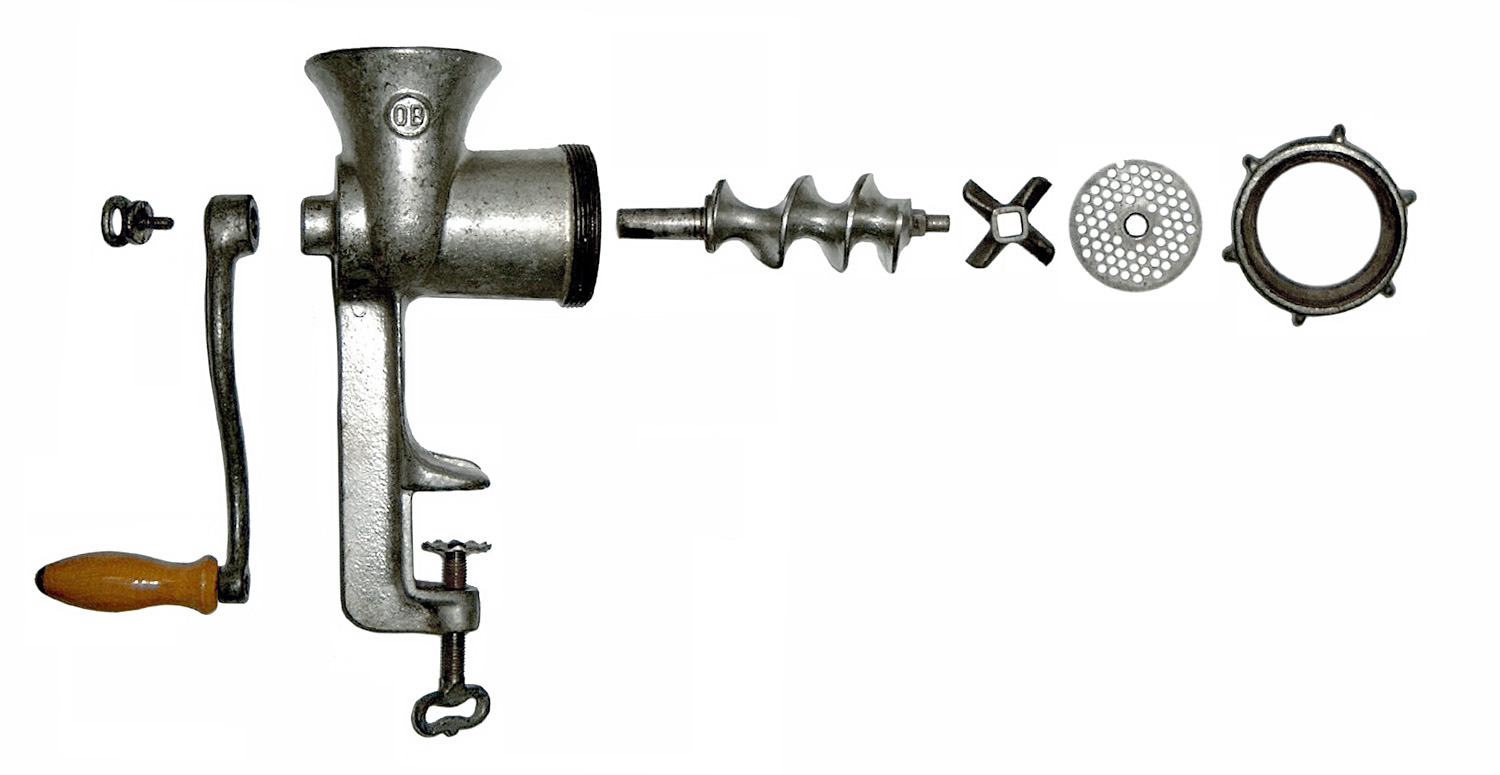
Disassembled hand-cranked grinder

== See also ==
- Food processor
- Ground beef
