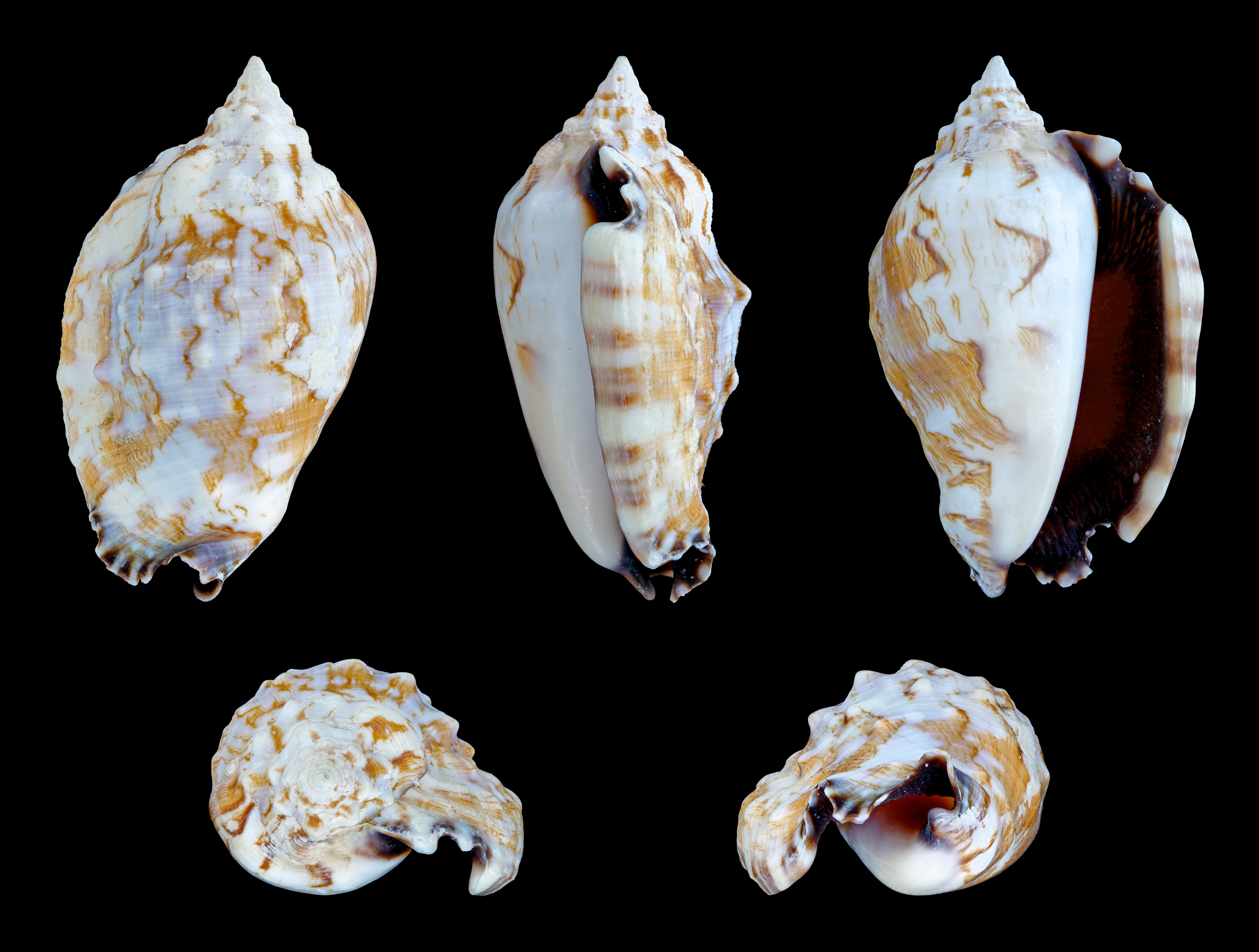

Scientific classification
- Kingdom: Animalia
- Phylum: Mollusca
- Class: Gastropoda
- Subclass: Caenogastropoda
- Order: Littorinimorpha
- Family: Strombidae
- Genus: Lentigo
- Species: L. pipus

Binomial name
- Lentigo pipus (Röding, 1798)

Synonyms
- Lambis pipus Röding, 1798 (basionym); Strombus adustus Reeve, 1851; Strombus exustus Swainson, 1822; Strombus papilio Dillwyn, 1817; Strombus pipus Röding, 1798

= Lentigo pipus =

Species of gastropod

Lentigo pipus, the elegant conch, is a species of Conch sea snail, a marine gastropod mollusc in the family Strombidae, the true conchs.

== Description ==
The shell size varies between 35 mm and 85 mm.

== Distribution ==
This species is distributed in the Indo-West Pacific along the Mascarene Basin and the Philippines.
