= Marsoulas =

- Commune
- Location of Marsoulas
- Location within France Location within Occitanie
- Coordinates: 43°06′23″N 0°59′58″E
- Country: France
- Region: Occitania
- Department: Haute-Garonne
- Arrondissement: Saint-Gaudens
- Canton: Bagnères-de-Luchon
- Intercommunality: Cagire Garonne Salat

Government
  - Mayor (2020–2026): Alexandre Ader
- Area^{1}: 2.4 km^{2} (0.93 sq mi)
- Elevation: 384 m (1,260 ft)
- Highest elevation: 422 m (1,385 ft)
- Lowest elevation: 292 m (958 ft)
- Population (2023): 143
  - Density: 60/km^{2} (150/sq mi)
- Time zone: UTC+01:00 (CET)
  - Summer (DST): UTC+02:00 (CEST)
- INSEE/Postal code: 31321 /31260
- ^{1} French Land Register data, which excludes lakes, ponds, glaciers > 1 km^{2} (0.386 sq mi or 247 acres) and river estuaries.

Marsoulas is a commune in the Haute-Garonne department in southwestern France.

It is notable for the Marsoulas Cave in which palæolithic artifacts and paintings were discovered.

== History ==
Early in the morning of 10 June 1944, Nazi Germany invaded Marsoulas, and killed 27 people, 11 being children.

== Population ==
Historical population
Year	Pop.	±% p.a.
1968	114	—
1975	94	−2.72%
1982	100	+0.89%
1990	112	+1.43%
1999	137	+2.26%
2007	137	+0.00%
2012	123	−2.13%
2017	123	+0.00%
2023	143	+2.54%
Source: INSEE

== See also ==
- Communes of the Haute-Garonne department
