= Mincing =

Food preparation technique

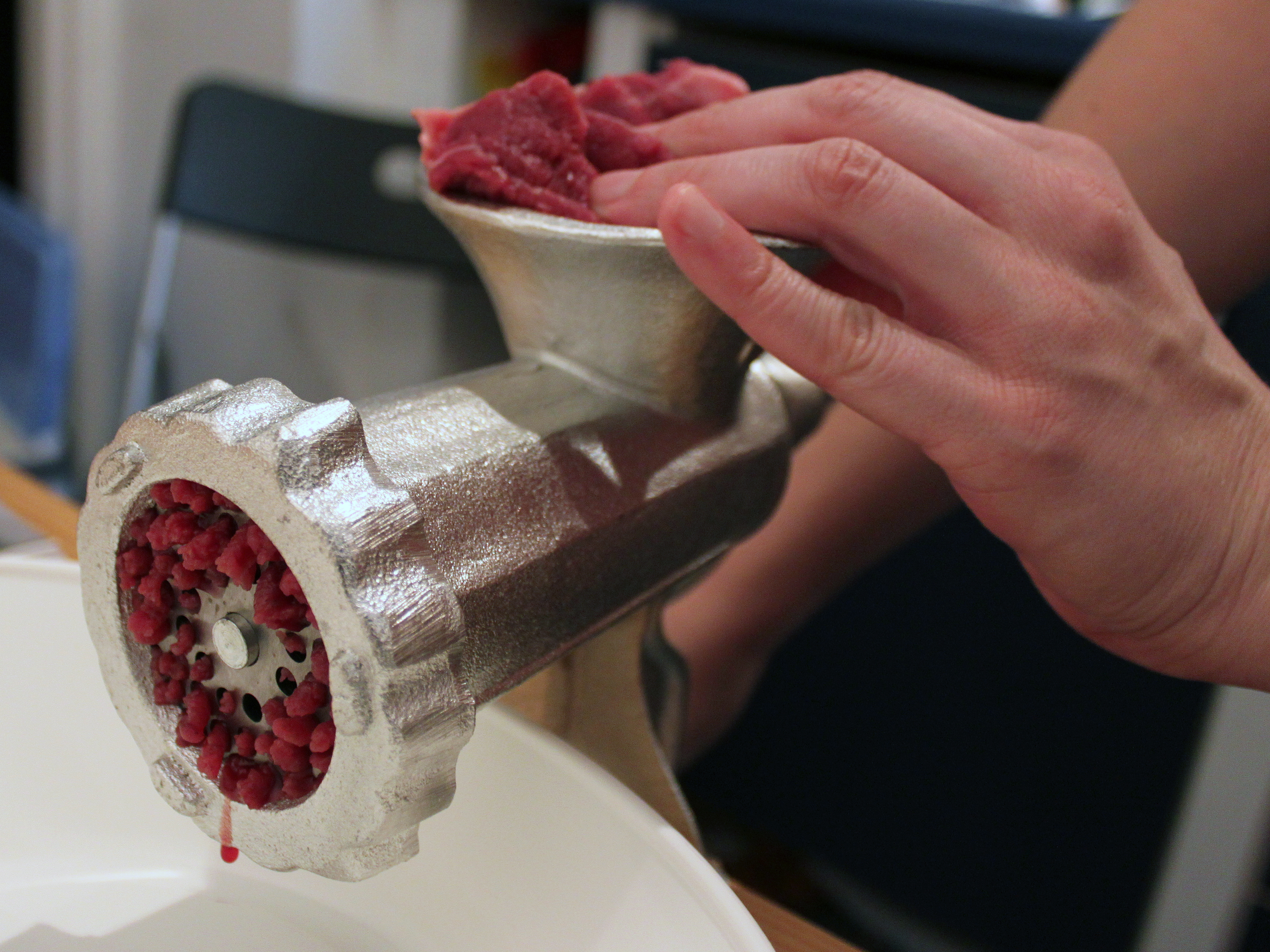
Meat grinder in operation. Mincing is slicing, not grinding/extruding

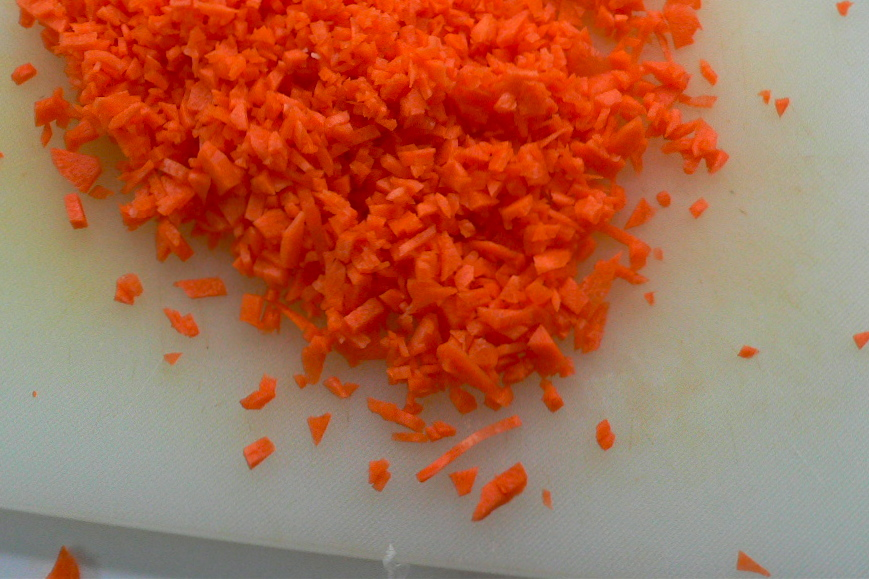
Minced carrots

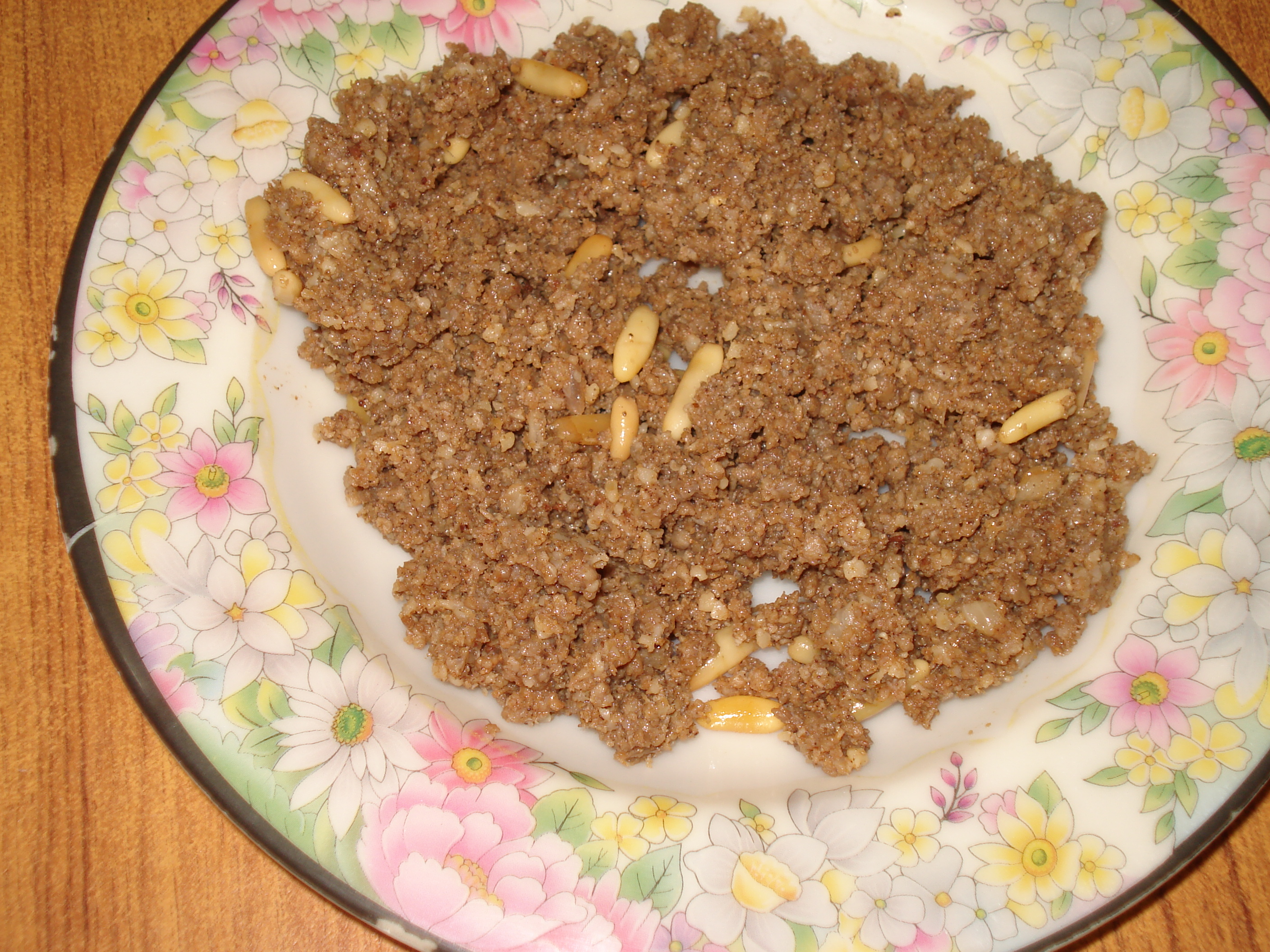
Minced lamb

Mincing is a culinary technique in which ingredients are cut into small, uniform pieces. Mincing was originally a manual process using knives or mezzalunas. The invention of the meat grinder or mincer in the 1850s made mincing faster and easier.

== Etymology ==
To mince in the culinary sense is "to cut up or grind (food, especially meat) into very small pieces, now typically in a machine with revolving blades". It is first attested in 1381: "Nym onyons & mynce hem smale & fry hem in oyle dolyf" ("Chop onions small and fry them in good oil"). The word is borrowed from the eleventh-century Anglo-Norman and Old French mincer, mincier: to cut into food into small pieces. The equivalent modern French term, hacher, dating from the thirteenth century, derives from hache, "axe".

== Technique ==
For centuries mincing was done using kitchen knives, sometimes including a multi-bladed, double-handled chopper known most commonly in English as a mezzaluna (Italian for "half moon") and in French as an hachoir.

=== Mincing machines ===
The mincing machine was invented in the 1850s and described by Scientific American as "a cutting or mincing machine, operating by means of a cylinder, or cylinders, having tapering grooves extending from end to end".

The first mincers were hand-cranked; the meat or other food to be minced was fed into the top aperture and propelled through the grinders, emerging as mince through a die at the outlet. Electrically powered mincers have since become available. Professional mincers have dies of varying sizes, most domestic models have two: the larger die grinds coarsely; the smaller, more finely. For food that needs to be particularly finely minced it may be necessary to put it through the machine twice.

=== Quality of machine mincing ===
The food writer Elizabeth David found that a mezzaluna "produces far superior minced meat to that done in the mincing machine, for it does not squeeze out the juices" adding that "few people would care to bother with it nowadays". The cook and food writer Jane Grigson agreed:

But with the first mincing-machines, prison, school and seaside boarding house cooks acquired a new weapon to depress their victims, with watery mince, shepherd's pie with rubbery granules of left-over meat."

== Uses ==
Larousse Gastronomique records numerous uses for a mincing machine, including the preparation of chicory fondue, fricadelles, haggis, hamburgers, mushroom fondue, pelmeni, potato fritters, potted meat and rillettes.

Several cooks and food writers prefer finely chopped meat to minced for some recipes. For cottage pie, Grigson and Felicity Cloake do so, as, for steak tartare, do many chefs. David prefers finely chopped meat to minced for pâtés.

In the US, the process is usually referred to as "grinding", and the product as "ground meat".

== Sources ==
- David, Elizabeth (2008) [1960]. French Provincial Cooking. London: Folio Society. OCLC 809349711.
- Davidson, Alan (1999). The Oxford Companion to Food. Oxford: Oxford University Press. ISBN 0-19-211579-0.
- Grigson, Jane (1992). English Food. London: Ebury Press. ISBN 978-0-09-177043-3.
- Hieatt, Constance; Sharon Butler, eds. (1985). Curye on Inglysch: English Culinary Manuscripts of the Fourteenth Century. London and New York: Oxford University Press. ISBN 978-0-19-722409-0.
- Kerridge, Tom (2014). Proper Pub Food. Bath: Absolute Press. ISBN 978-1-47-290353-2.
- Leith, Prue (2018). Prue: Favourite Recipes from a Lifetime of Cooking and Eating. London: Bluebird. ISBN 978-1-50-989148-1.
- Montagné, Prosper (1976). Larousse Gastronomique. London: Hamlyn. OCLC 1285641881.
- Ramsay, Gordon (2010). Chef for All Seasons. London: Quadrille. ISBN 978-1-84-400876-6.
- Ruhlman, Michael (2010). The Elements of Cooking. New York: Scribner. ISBN 978-1-43-917252-0.
- Torode, John (2008). Beef. London: Quadrille. ISBN 978-1-84400-690-8.
