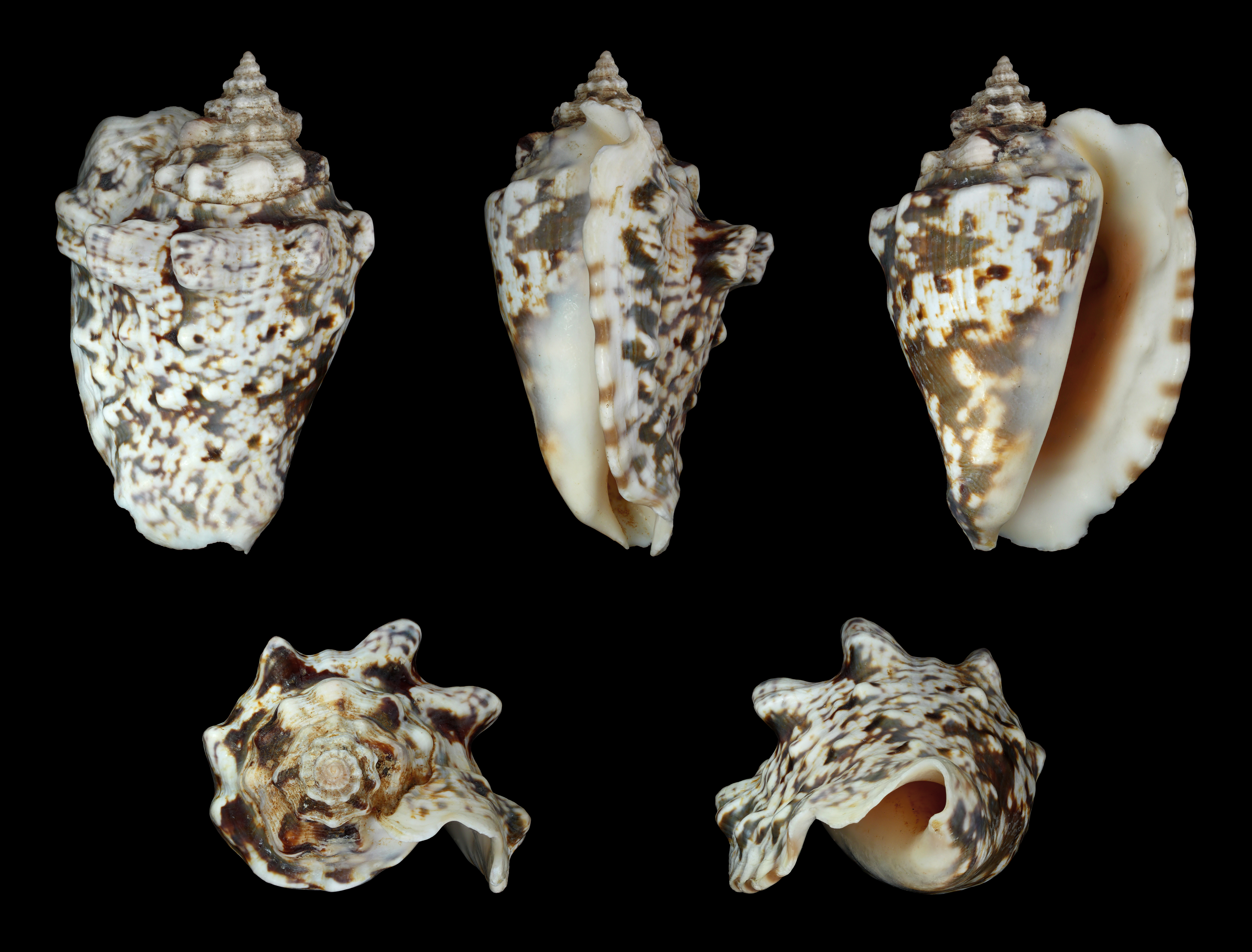
- Five views of a shell of the silver conch, Lentigo lentiginosus

Scientific classification
- Kingdom: Animalia
- Phylum: Mollusca
- Class: Gastropoda
- Subclass: Caenogastropoda
- Order: Littorinimorpha
- Family: Strombidae
- Genus: Lentigo; Jousseaume, 1886

Type species
- Strombus lentiginosus Linnaeus, 1758

= Lentigo (gastropod) =

Genus of gastropods

Lentigo is a genus of sea snails, marine gastropod molluscs in the family Strombidae, the true conchs.

== Species ==
Species within the genus Lentigo include:

- Lentigo lentiginosus (Linnaeus, 1758)
- Lentigo pipus (Röding, 1798)
