= Marsoulas Cave =

Cave in southern France

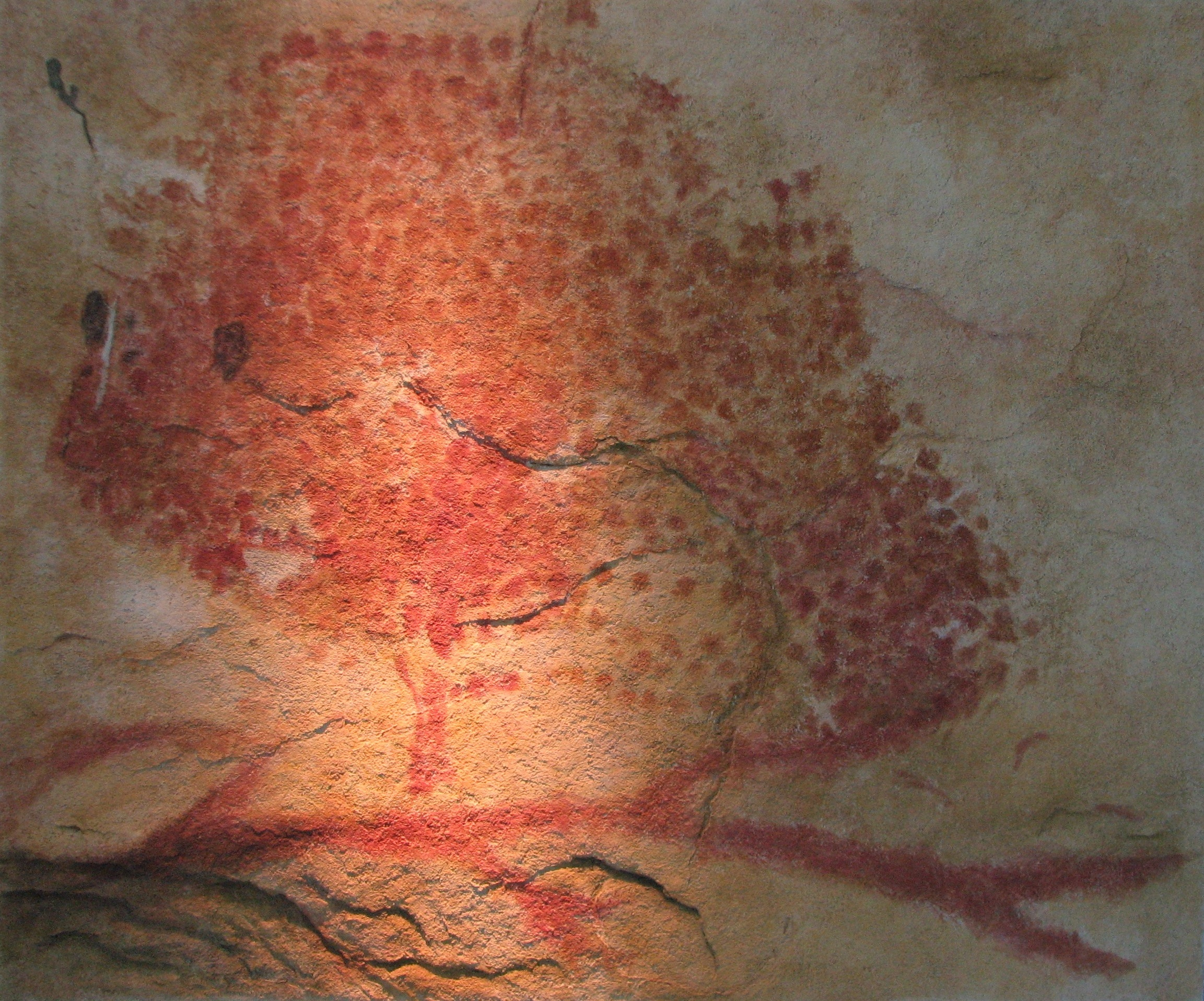
- Bison painting

- Location in Occitania, France
- 43°6′11″N 0°59′10″E
- Location: Salies-du-Salat, Occitania, France

History
- Built: c. 18,000 years ago
- Abandoned: c. 17,000 years ago

Site notes
- Length: 100 m (330 ft)
- Excavation dates: 1883, 1931
- Archaeologists: Henri Breuil, André Leroi-Gourhan

The Marsoulas Cave in southwestern France, near Marsoulas in the Haute-Garonne, is a small cave notable for its archaeological wealth, including Paleolithic cave paintings and ornaments from the Magdalenian. It consists of a straight gallery about 100 m (330 ft) long with parietal art along the entire length of the cave. The art includes human and animal (bison and horses) figures as well as geometric forms and has been described as being of "profound stylistic originality with few equivalents in the region from the same period". The prehistoric artists who produced these used the varied topography of the cave and ceiling to produce three-dimensional engravings and paintings in scales ranging between 2.2 m (7.2 ft) to tiny miniatures.

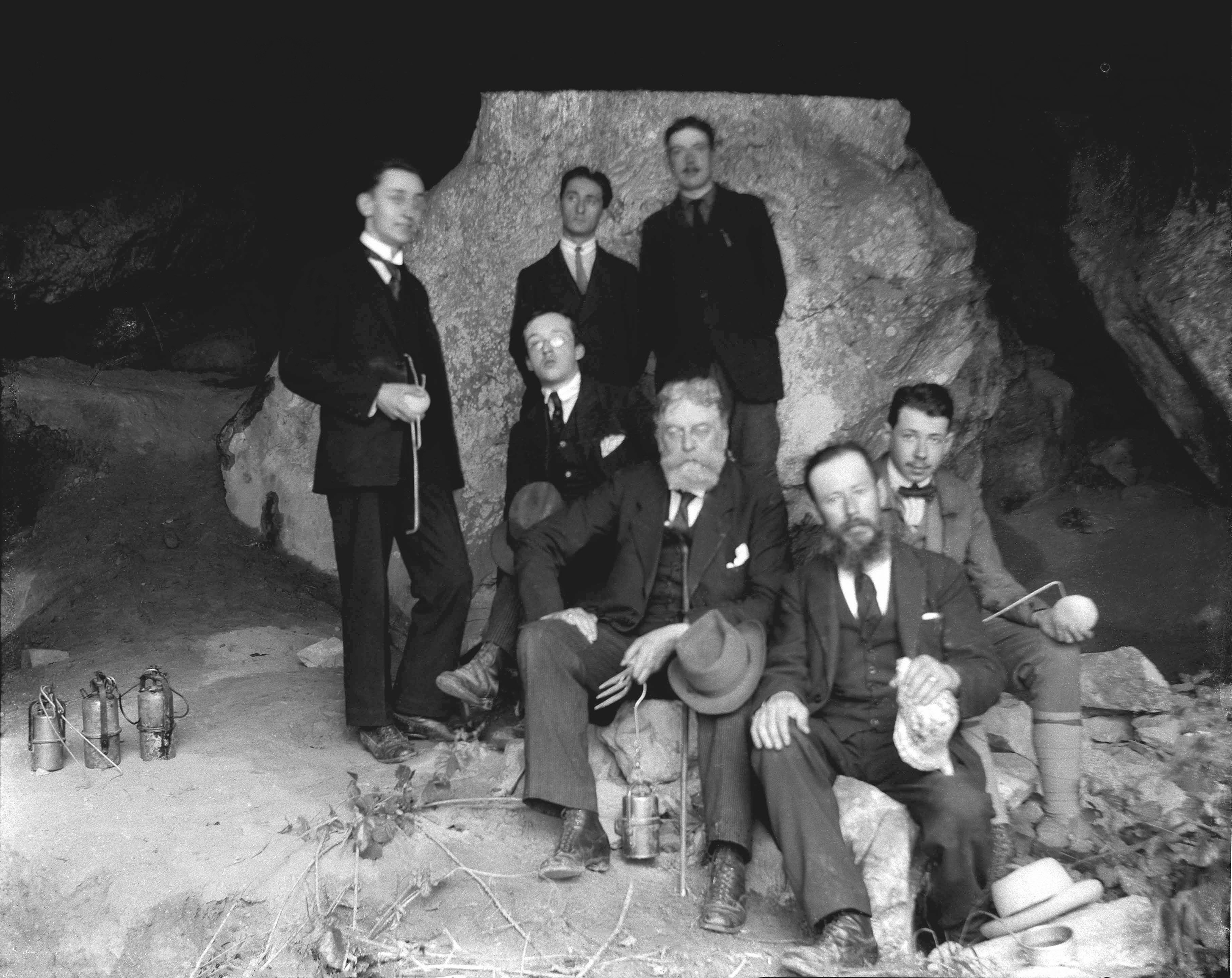
The 1931 excavation

Excavations have been carried out since at least 1883 by a number of researchers including Henri Breuil and André Leroi-Gourhan and between these and the visitors attracted by the many publications describing the cave (the first was published in 1885), virtually all the easily accessible surfaces were damaged. Public entrance to the cave was closed in 1996 due to vandalism and graffiti. Engravings and paintings found in the cave have been dated to around 17,000 years ago and an extensive program of photographing the decorated panels has been undertaken. These have been digitised and the cave interior laser scanned and 3D images produced with the intention of producing "different recreations of the cave and eventually offer a series of 3D environments for other researchers and the public at large to explore." These will include models of the cave today, as it might have looked when the rock art was new, a virtual version aimed at making the rock art more visible than it is today, and another which will attempt to model what the prehistoric shape of the cave would have been.

A conch from around 18,000 years ago found in the cave in 1931 was demonstrated in 2021 as having been adapted by Magdalenian people as a musical instrument. The patterns painted on the inner-surface of the shell's opening are done in same style as those on the walls of the cave.
