= Mezzaluna =

Knife with one or more curved blades and a handle on each end

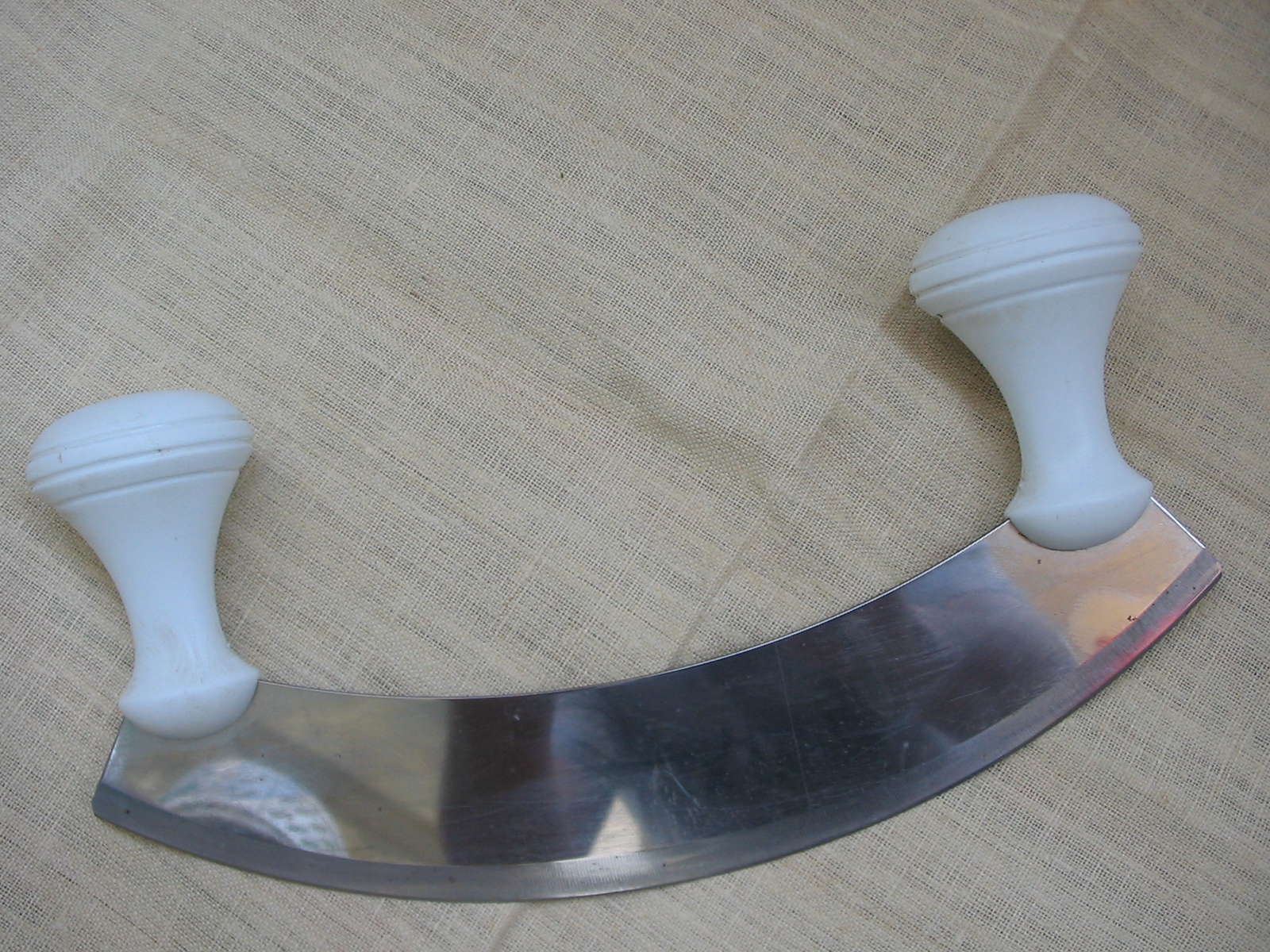
Mezzaluna with a single blade

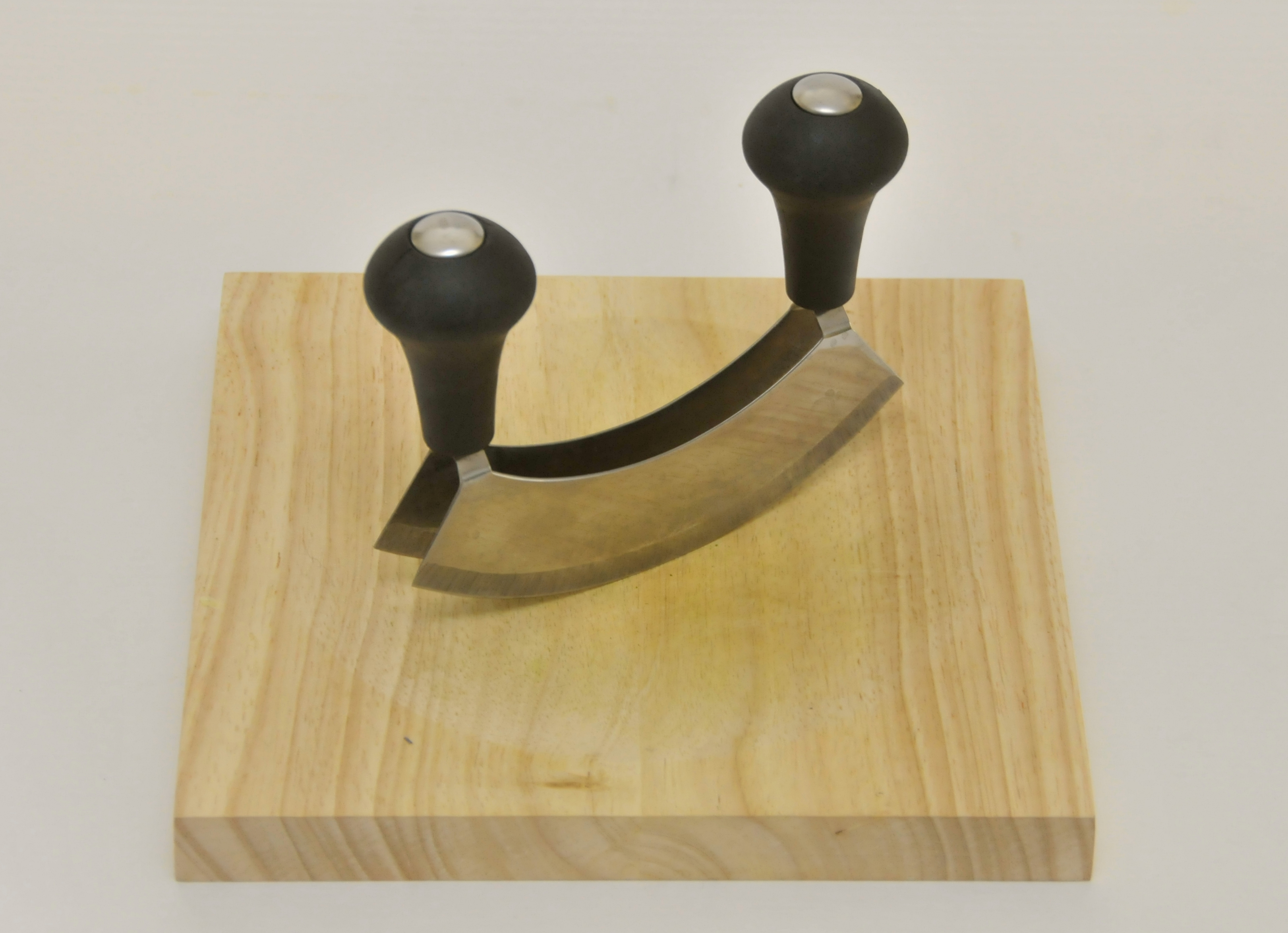
Mezzaluna with a double blade used for chopping herbs

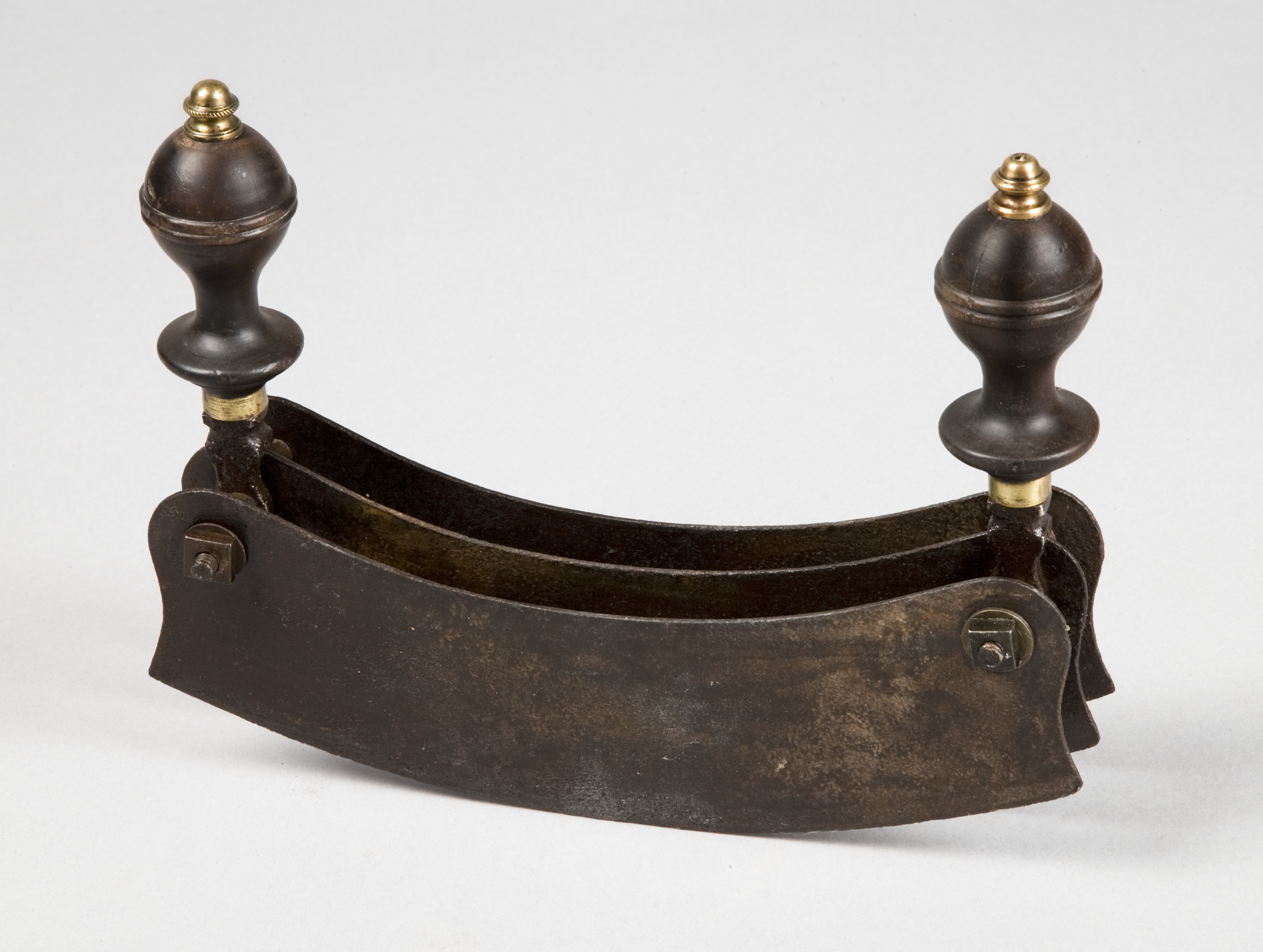
Mezzaluna with a triple blade used for cutting meat

A mezzaluna (/ˌmɛtsəˈluːnə/ MET-sə-LOO-nə, Italian: [ˌmɛddzaˈluːna]) is a knife consisting of one or more curved blades with a handle on each end, which is rocked back and forth chopping the ingredients below with each movement. They most commonly have a single blade, but are sometimes seen with two or three blades.

Mezzalunas may be found sold with a cutting board that has a shallow indentation in it, marketed as a herb chopper.

== Etymology ==
Mezzaluna means literally 'half moon' or 'crescent' in Italian, after the curved shape of the blade, and is the most common name used in the UK. Other names used include "herb chopper", hachoir (from French, pronounced [aʃwaʁ]), makhratah (from Arabic مخرطة), and hakmesser (from Yiddish האַקמעסער).

== Use ==
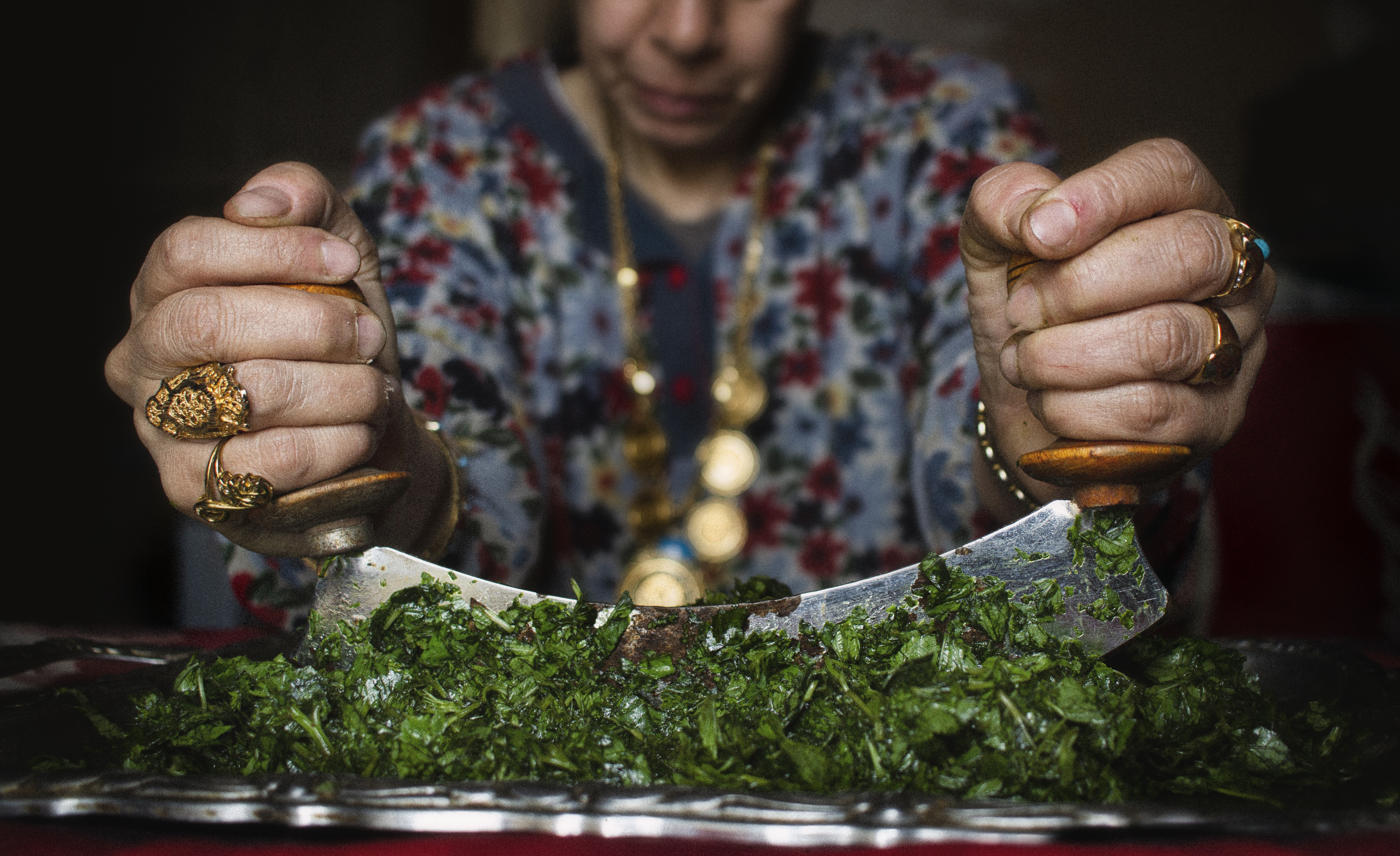
Egyptian woman chopping mulukhiyah

It is typically used for mincing herbs or garlic, but it can be used for chopping other things such as cheese or meat. Very large single blade versions are sometimes used for pizza. Common uses in Italy include preparation of a soffritto or a pesto, etc. In countries like Egypt, Jordan and Palestine, it is used to chop mulukhiyah.

== See also ==
Media related to mezzalunas at Wikimedia Commons

- List of food preparation utensils
- Pizza cutter
- Tumi – any of several sharp tool Central Andean cultures
- Ulu – traditional knife of Inuit, Yupik and Aleut women
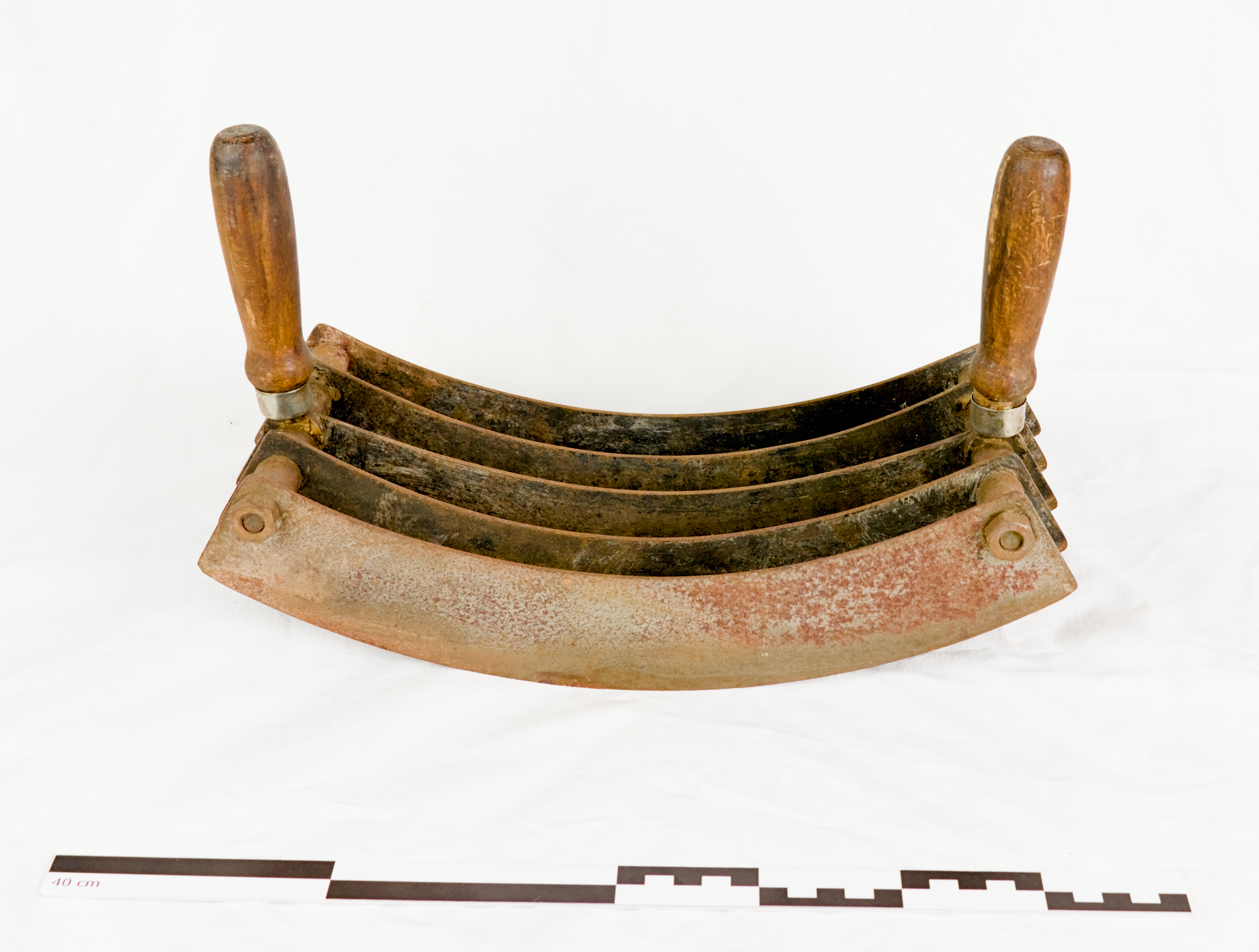
- Five blades mezzaluna.
  Drawknife – a type of knife with two handles
