= Alonsotegi =

Municipality in Basque Country, Spain

- Municipality
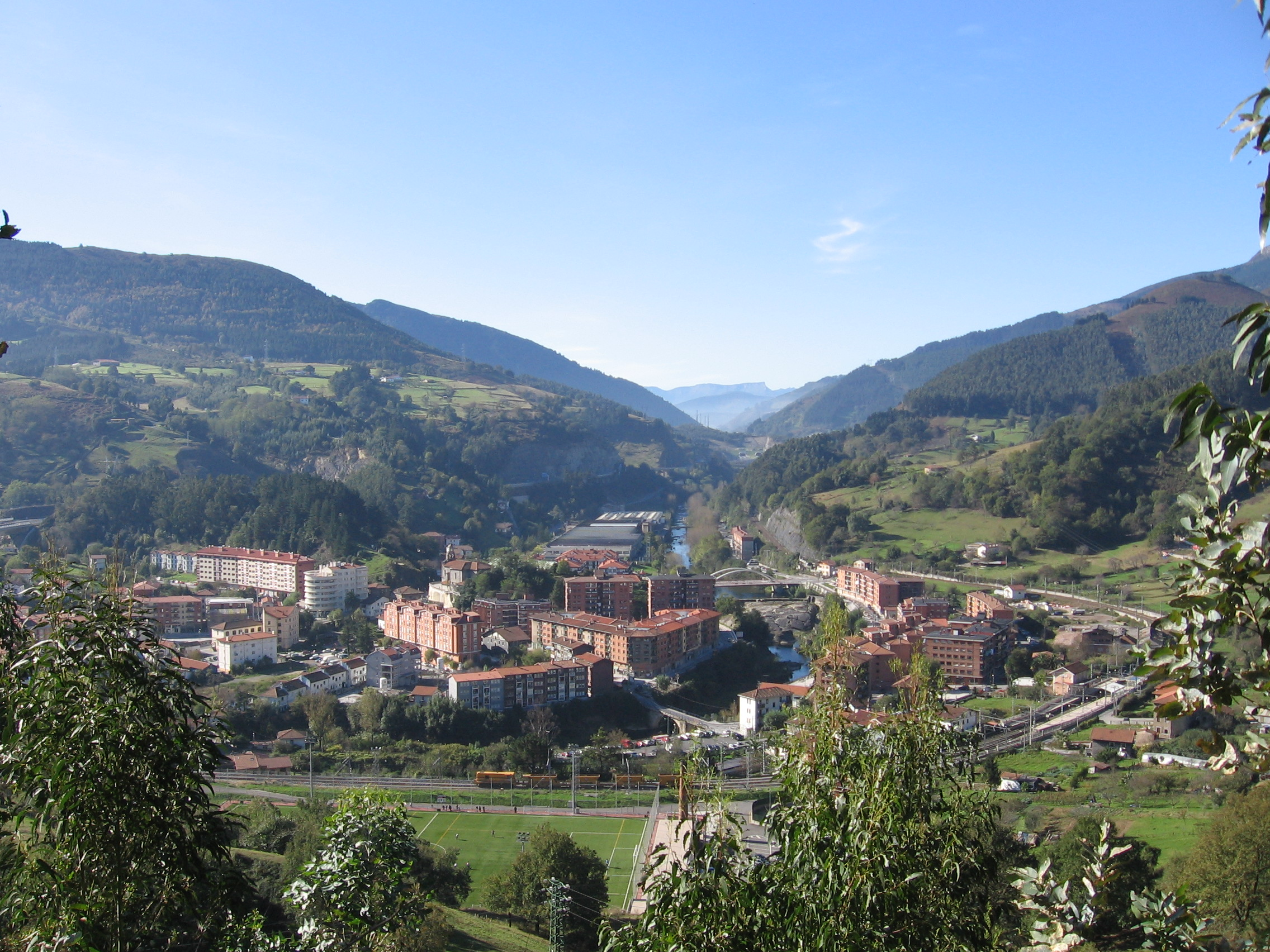

- Coat of arms

- Location of Alonsotegi within the Basque Country Alonsotegi (Spain)
- Coordinates: 43°14′48″N 2°59′16″W
- Country: Spain
- Autonomous community: Basque Country
- Province: Biscay
- Comarca: Greater Bilbao

Government
  - Mayor: José Luis Erezuma (PNV)

Area
  - Total: 21 km^{2} (8.1 sq mi)

Population (2025-01-01)
  - Total: 2,991
  - Density: 140/km^{2} (370/sq mi)
- Demonym: Basque: alonsotegiarra
- Time zone: UTC+1 (CET)
  - Summer (DST): UTC+2 (CEST)
- Postal code: 48810
- Website: Official website

Alonsotegi (Spanish: Alonsótegui) is a municipality in the province of Biscay, Basque Country, Spain. Alonsotegi was attached to the Baracaldo municipality until the end of the 19th century, when it separated and was officially recognized as its own independent municipality. Alonsotegi is approximately 8 kilometres from the center of Bilbao. It is located in the valley of the Cadagua River, following Highway BI-636.

With a total area of 21 km^{2}, its 2,907 inhabitants (INE 2019) are distributed across three main settlements: Alonsotegi (the capital), Iráuregui, and Arbuyo.

== Geography ==
Alonsotegi encompasses a total area of 21 km^{2}. Much of the municipality's industry and population is concentrated in the corridor opened by the Cadagua River between the Sierra Sasiburu range (with peaks as high as 500 m above sea level) and the Ganekogorta (998 m) and Pagasarri (673 m) mountains. Several tributaries start in the mountains and flow down the slopes to the Cadagua. The capital is located at an altitude of 32 m. Barakaldo and Bilbao border on the north, Arrankudiaga and Güeñes on the south, Arrigorriaga and Bilbao on the east, and Güeñes on the west.

== History ==
Alonsotegi is not referenced in any document before 1300.

Its history can be divided into four distinct periods:

1. Until the late 15th and early 16th centuries, Alonsotegi was part of the Arrigorriaga municipality. The San Antolín church, the oldest building in Alonsotegi, was constructed in the 15th century.
2. In the 16th century, Alonsotegi was established as an independent municipality and remained so until 1888. The San Bartolomé parish church was constructed in the 16th century. It split from its founding church, the Santa María Magdalena Church in Arrigorriaga, and became independent due to the distance between both locations. On October 24, 1647, both municipalities signed an agreement that determined, among many other things, the use of pastures and meadows and the political and provincial governments each municipality had to follow. On August 7, 1777, an agreement between the town Bilbao and the municipalities of Alonsotegi and Arrigorriaga was signed at the Church of San Vicente de Abando for the "recognition of a new ice house constructed by the town in the Ganekogorta mountains." By the 19th century, the impact of the Carlist Wars on Alonsotegi's coffers was obvious; much of their provisions were given to the Carlist Army, causing Alonsotegi to push for annexation by Baracaldo in 1888.
3. From November 13, 1888, until December 31, 1990, Alonsotegi remained annexed to the Baracaldo municipality. Schools were constructed in 1903, followed by the new San Bartolomé Church in 1904.
4. On January 20, 1980, the Alonsotegi bombing took place in Alonsotegi. The Grupos Armados Españoles (GAE), an armed group operating in the Basque Country in the early years of the Spanish democracy, planted a bomb in a local bar which exploded that evening killing four civilians and wounding ten.
5. January 1, 1991, marked a new stage for Alonsotegi. A new and distinct municipality was created, together with the Iráuregui district.

== Places of interest ==
Scenic hiking trails connect the city to the Ganekogorta and Sasiburu mountain ranges.

The area is full of attractions, from manmade structures like mines, ice houses or workers' homes, to natural features like mineral deposits, oak groves, beech forests, meadows, wild boars, and roe deer.

Alonsotegi has several items of historical, cultural and natural interest:

- Pagasarri's ice houses
- Vizcaya Bridge
- San Antolín de Iráuregui, San Martín, Santa Quiteria, and Nuestra Señora de la Guía Hermitages.
- Neobasque architecture, like the Barrankalea working houses
- Neo-Gothic architecture, like San Bartolomé Church
- Architectural elements with ethnographic interest, like the stables and pens in Artiba's pastoral district

== Municipal elections, 2011 ==
Six parties submitted municipal lists: EAJ-PNV, Bildu, PSE-EE, PP, EB and an independent party called Alonsotegiko Ezkerra. The results were as follows:

| Political Party | Number of votes | % valid votes for candidates | Town councillor(s) |
|---|---|---|---|
| Basque Nationalist Party (EAJ-PNV) | 708 | 41,55% | 5 |
| Bildu (Bildu) | 500 | 29,34% | 4 |
| Alonsotegiko Ezkerra (AE) | 194 | 11,38% | 1 |
| Basque Country's Socialist Party – Euskadiko Ezkerra (PSE-EE) | 173 | 10,15% | 1 |
| Partido Popular (PP) | 68 | 3,99% | 0 |
| Ezker Batua (EB) | 30 | 1,76% | 0 |

This led to the election of Aitor Santiesteban Aldama as mayor.

== Notable people ==
- Fray Martin de Coscojales, monk
- Fray Miguel de Alonsotegui and Miranda and Jose Zabala, friar
- Iñigo Urkullu, politician
- Andoni Goikoetxea, former footballer and football coach.
- Marcelino Bilbao Bilbao, Lieutenant Isaac battalion Bridge of the National Confederation of Labour (CNT) and the People's Republic Army (EPR). Survivor Nazi concentration camp Mauthausen.
