= Blowing horn =

Natural horn instrument

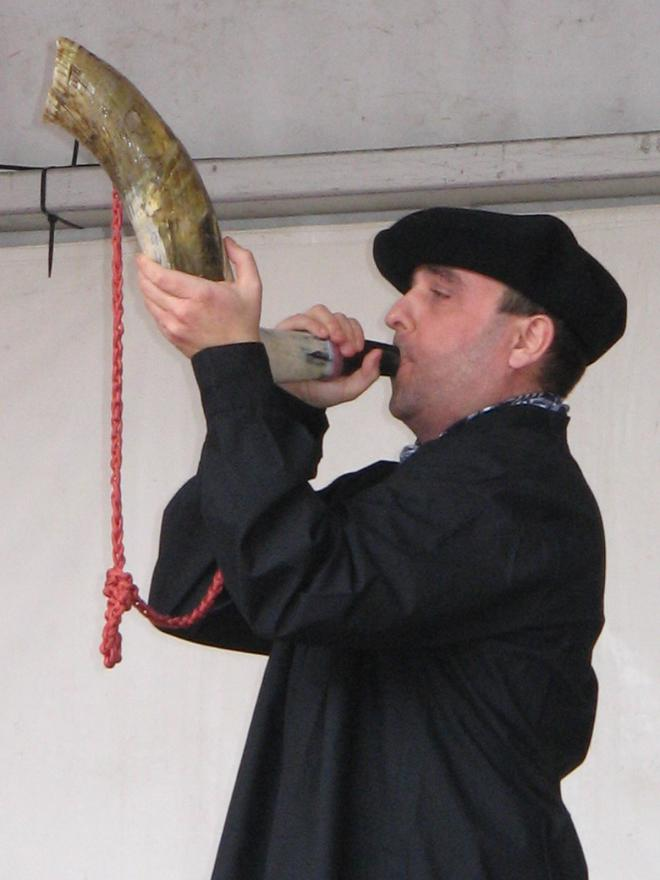
Blowing an ox horn in a Basque festival

The blowing horn or winding horn is a sound device that is usually made of or shaped like an animal horn, arranged to blow from a hole in the pointed end of it. This rudimentary device had a variety of functions in many cultures, in most cases reducing its scope to exhibiting, celebratory or group identification purposes (signal instrument). On the other hand, it has kept its function and profile in many cattle raising, agricultural and hunter-gatherer societies.

== Types ==
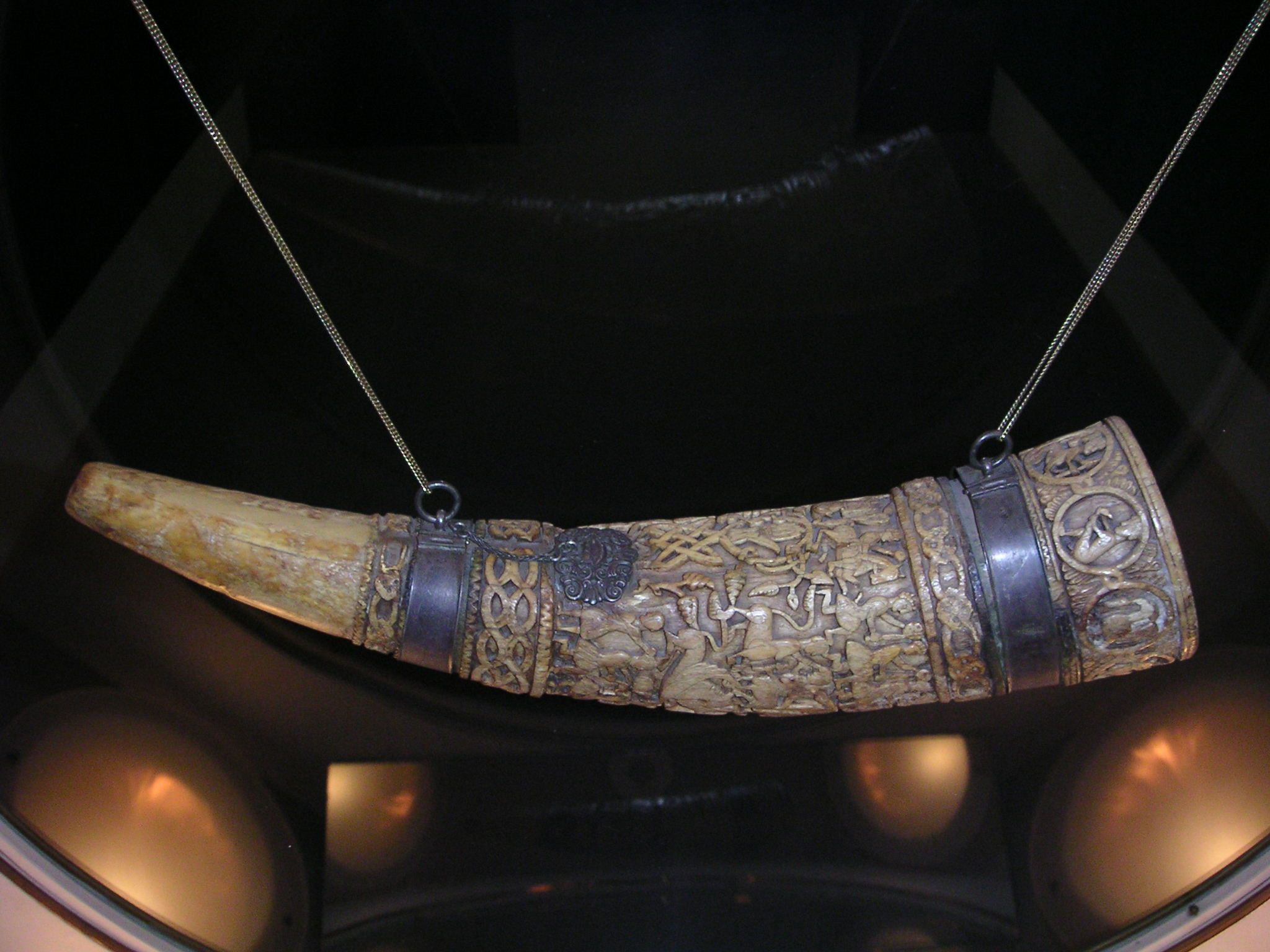
The horn attributed to the 10th-century Magyar chieftain Lehel, kept in Jászberény, Hungary.

The oldest varieties were made of horns of Bovidae and wood. The earliest findings in Europe are Bronze Age metal horns, the strength of which resulted in its better endurance of the rigours of time. As a result, previous traces of other materials have vanished, so the oldest surviving animal horn dates back to the Late Iron Age in Visnum, Sweden. As big horned animals are rarely found in Scandinavia, blowing horns are often made from wood, wound birch bark or bout, called a "lur".

== Uses ==
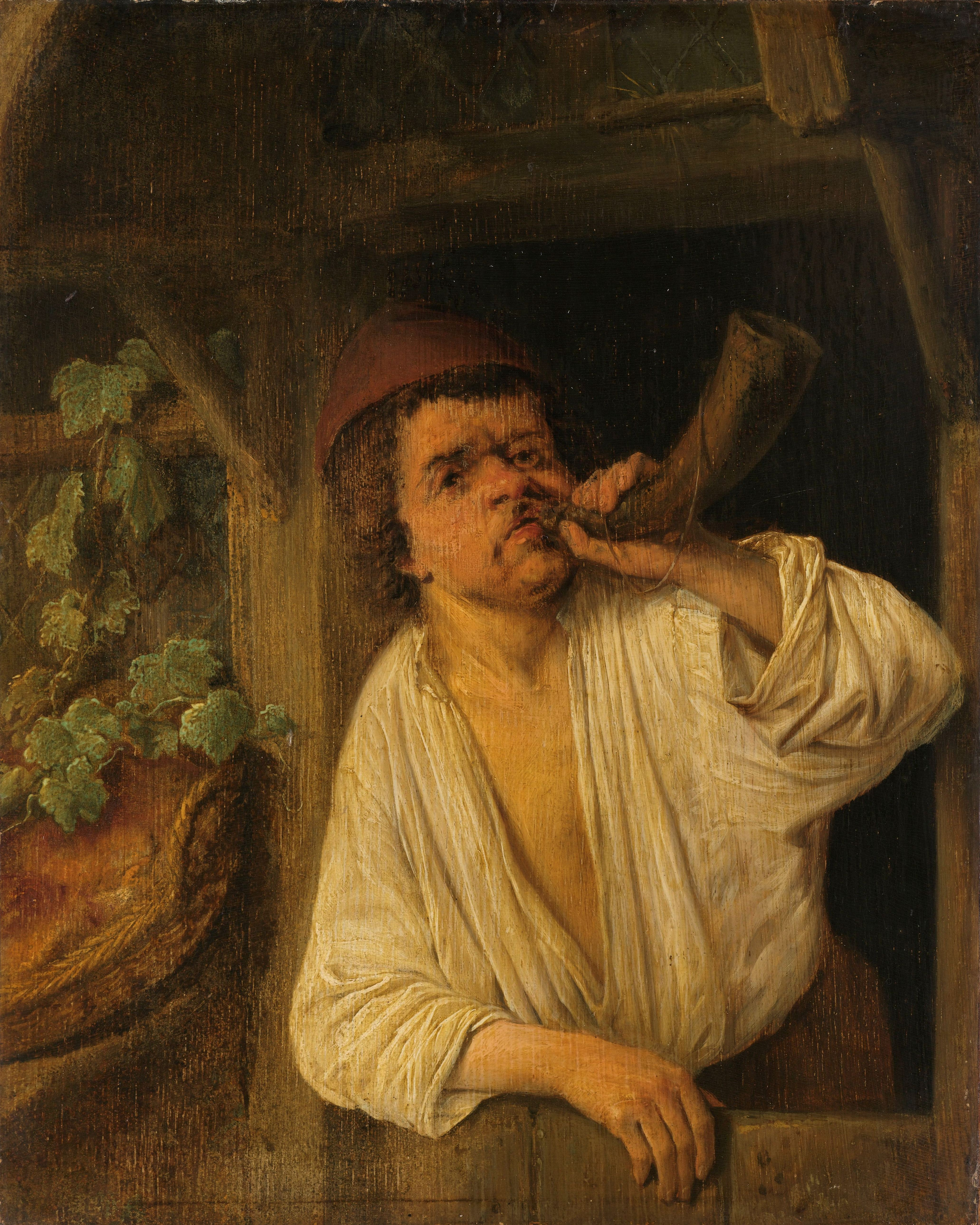
Painting of a baker blowing his horn, by Adriaen van Ostade

Many horns have been used as sounding cries by ancient societies. A modern day descendant of the horn, the bugle, is used to call out orders in military camps. The hunting horn was used to communicate on a hunt and is still used today in some places.

In Biscay, territory of the Basque Country, following an old tradition, a practice is being restored to blow the horn from five mountains in the province once a year. These mountains, namely Gorbea (4,859 ft.), Sollube (2,251 ft), Oiz (3,376 ft.), Ganekogorta (3,274 ft) and Kolitza (2,884 ft) are dubbed the montes bocineros, meaning the 'hornblower mounts'. According to historic evidence, up to the late 16th century the Biscayne were summoned to the General Council of the Domain of Biscay to be held in the town of Guernica by playing horns from the summits.

A like function may be attributed to the pututu, the sound instrument from the Andes. The device, usually made of a shell or hollowed out cow horn, is used to summon people to a meeting or a festival. In the Inca period, the messengers spreading throughout Empire known as chaski carried along a pututu, which was blown to herald their arrival to a particular place.

Cheap plastic vuvuzelas achieved fame and controversy in the hands of football supporters during the 2010 World Cup in South Africa.

== Mythology ==
In Norse mythology, Gjallarhorn (Old Norse: [ˈɡjɑlːɑrˌhorn]; "hollering horn" or "the loud sounding horn") is a horn associated with the god Heimdallr and the wise being Mímir. The sound of Heimdallr's horn will herald the beginning of Ragnarök, the sound of which will be heard in all corners of the world.

== Religion ==
One of the more widespread uses for blowing horns today is the shofar, a ram or Kudu horn with a hole drilled through it. The shofar is used mainly for Jewish ceremonies such as Rosh Hashanah. Horns also have significance in Christianity and Islam.

The dungchen is a ritual horn used in Tibetan Buddhism.

An angel (Moroni) blowing a horn as a warning voice is an unofficial symbol used frequently by the Church of Jesus Christ of Latter-day Saints (frequently referred to by others as "Mormons"). A statue of the Angel Moroni sits atop the main spire of most of the sacred temples belonging to this church.

== Cowhorn, oxhorn ==
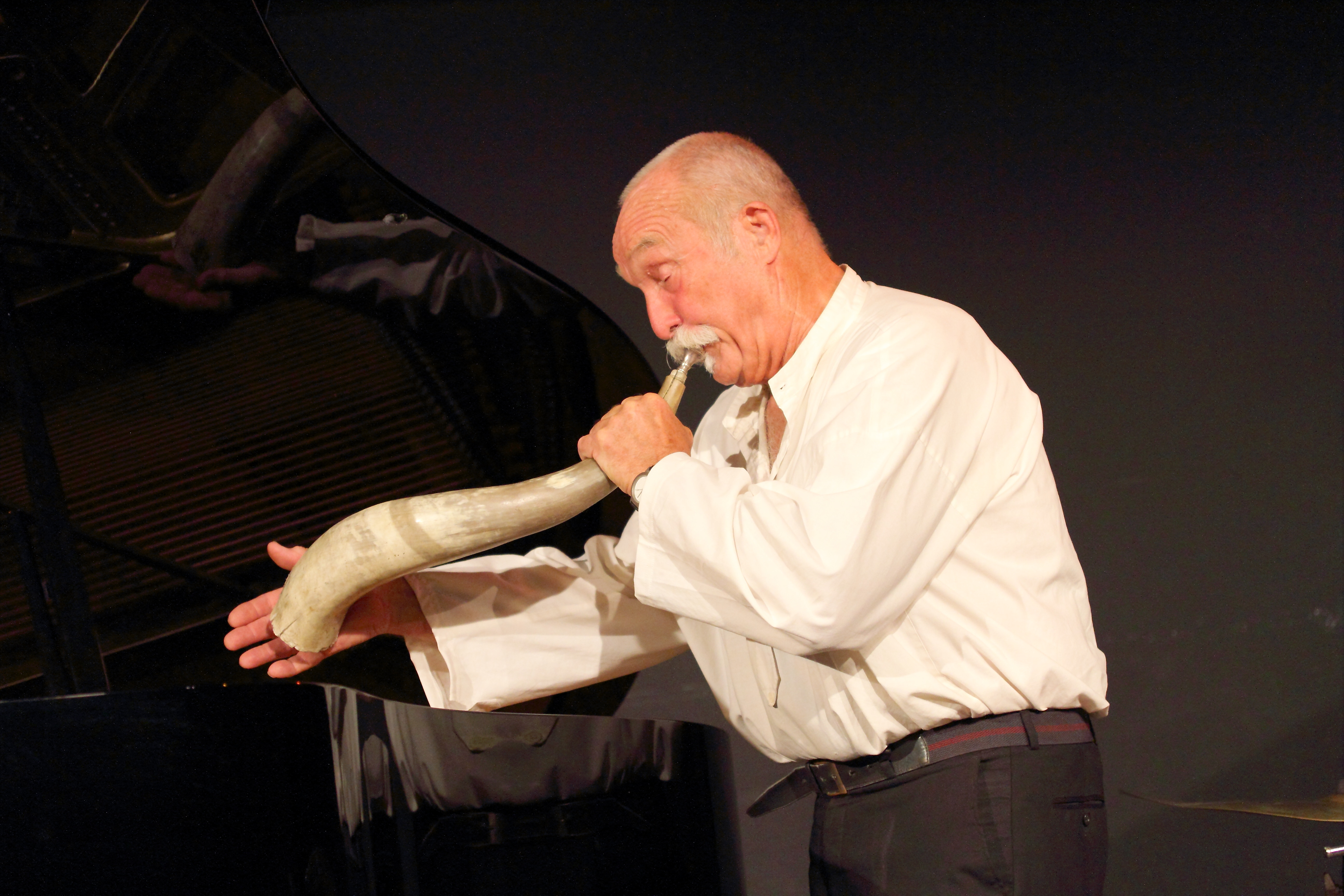
German musician Günter Sommer playing an oxhorn.

In classical music, bullhorns, cowhorns, oxhorns or steerhorns with the tips removed have been called for by Wagner (a stierhörner) for Der Ring des Nibelungen, Die Walküre, Götterdämmerung and Die Meistersinger. Such instruments have been used "since antiquity" in war (war horn) and for community events, such as signaling alarm, calling assembly, and herding.

== See also ==
- Swedish cowhorn
- Bukkehorn
- The shells of some very large sea snails are modified by humans so that they can be blown like a horn, see Conch (musical instrument).
- Drinking horn
- Powder horn
