= Horagai =

Japanese conch shells used as trumpets

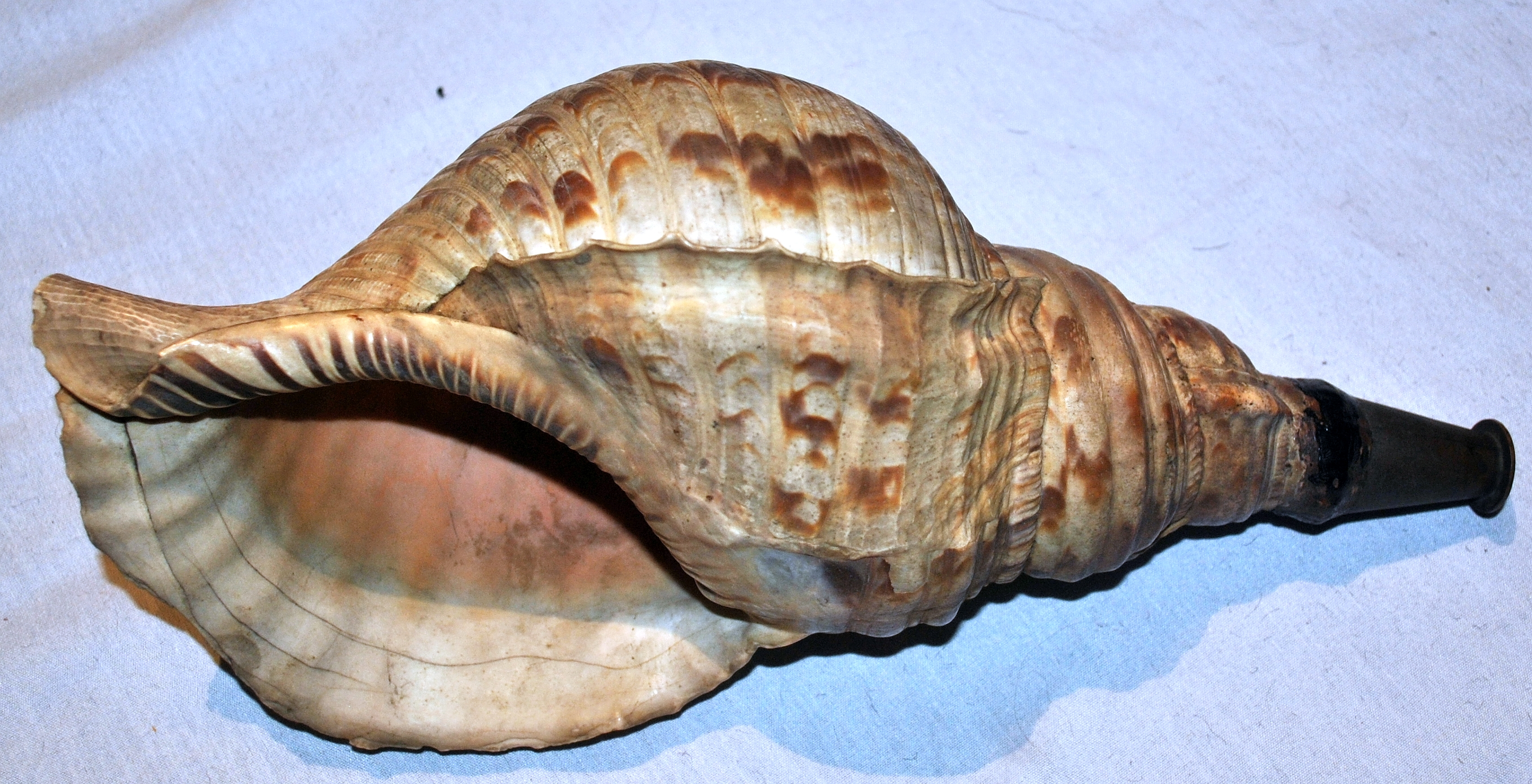
Japanese horagai, a conch shell used for religious purposes or as a signal for samurai

Horagai (法螺貝) (or jinkai 陣貝) are large conch shells, usually from Charonia tritonis, that have been used as trumpets in Japan for many centuries. The instrument, which has served a number of purposes throughout Japanese history, has been given a number of Japanese names depending on its function. Special schools still teach students to play the traditional music associated with the conch.

== Instrument ==
Unlike most shell trumpets from other parts of the world which produce only one pitch, the Japanese hora or horagai can produce three or five different notes. The different pitches are achieved using a bronze or wooden mouthpiece attached to the apex of the shell's spire. At freezing temperatures (often encountered in the mountainous regions of Japan) the lips may freeze to the metal surface, so wooden or bamboo mouthpieces are used.

Horagai being used in a Shugendō ceremony, 2016

== Historical usage ==
=== Religion ===
The conch is used by Buddhist monks for religious purposes. Its use goes back at least 1,000 years, and it is still used today for some rituals, such as the omizutori (water drawing) portion of the Shuni-e rites at the Tōdai-ji in Nara. Each Shugendō school has his own conch shell melodies.

The hora is especially associated with the Yamabushi, ascetic monks of the Shugendō tradition. The yamabushi used the trumpet to signal their presence (or movements) to one another across mountains and to accompany the chanting of sutras.

=== Military ===
In war, the shell, called jinkai, or "war shell", was one of several signal devices used by Japanese feudal warriors known as samurai. A large conch would be used and fitted with a bronze (or wooden) mouthpiece. It would be held in an openwork basket and blown with a different combination of "notes" to signal troops to attack, withdraw, or change strategies, in the same way a bugle or flugelhorn was used in the west. The trumpeter was called a kai yaku (貝役).

The jinkai served a similar function to drums and bells in signaling troop formations, setting a rhythm for marching, providing something of a heroic accompaniment to encourage the troops and confusing the enemy by inferring that the troop numbers were large enough to require such trumpeters. Many daimyōs (feudal lords) enlisted yamabushi to serve as kai yaku, due to their experience with the instrument.

The sound of jinkai is often used in motion pictures and television dramas as a symbolic sound effect indicating an impending battle, e.g., The Last Samurai or the 2007 Taiga drama Fūrinkazan, but both of these screen renditions use deep, resonating monotones, not the melodic tones that yamabushi used for relaying messages.

== See also ==
- Conch (musical instrument)
- Nagak, a similar shell horn used in Korea
- Shankha
