= Conch (instrument) =

Musical instrument made from a seashell (conch)

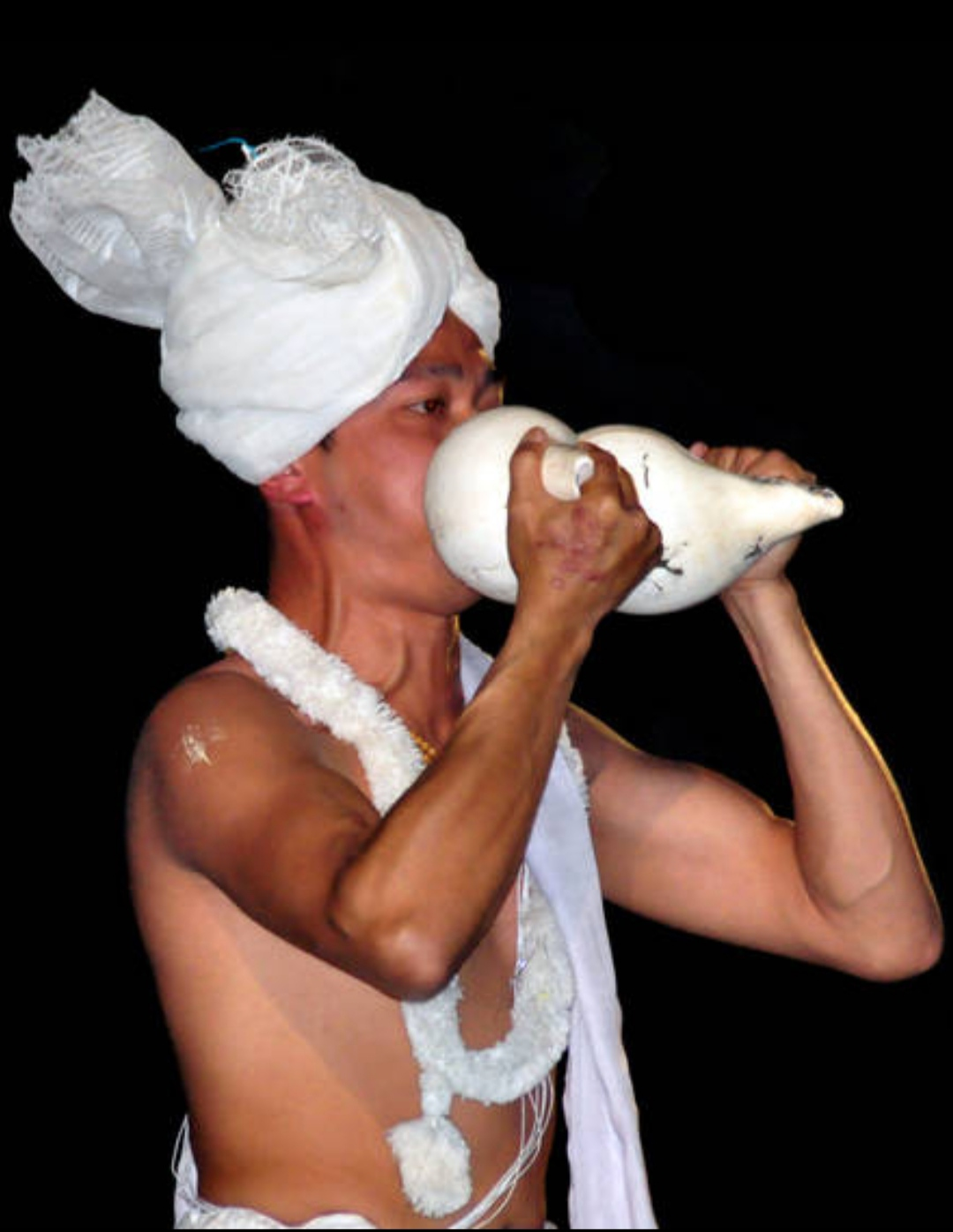
- A classical Meitei musical performing art of blowing Moibung (Meitei for 'conch shell') of Manipur

Brass instrument
- Other names: conque, seashell horn, shell trumpet
- Classification: Natural trumpet
- Hornbostel–Sachs classification: 423.11 (Conches)
- Inventor: Prehistoric
- Volume: High

Playing range
- Limited, typically only a few notes

Related instruments
- Shankha; Shofar

Sound sample
- Demonstration of a conch shell

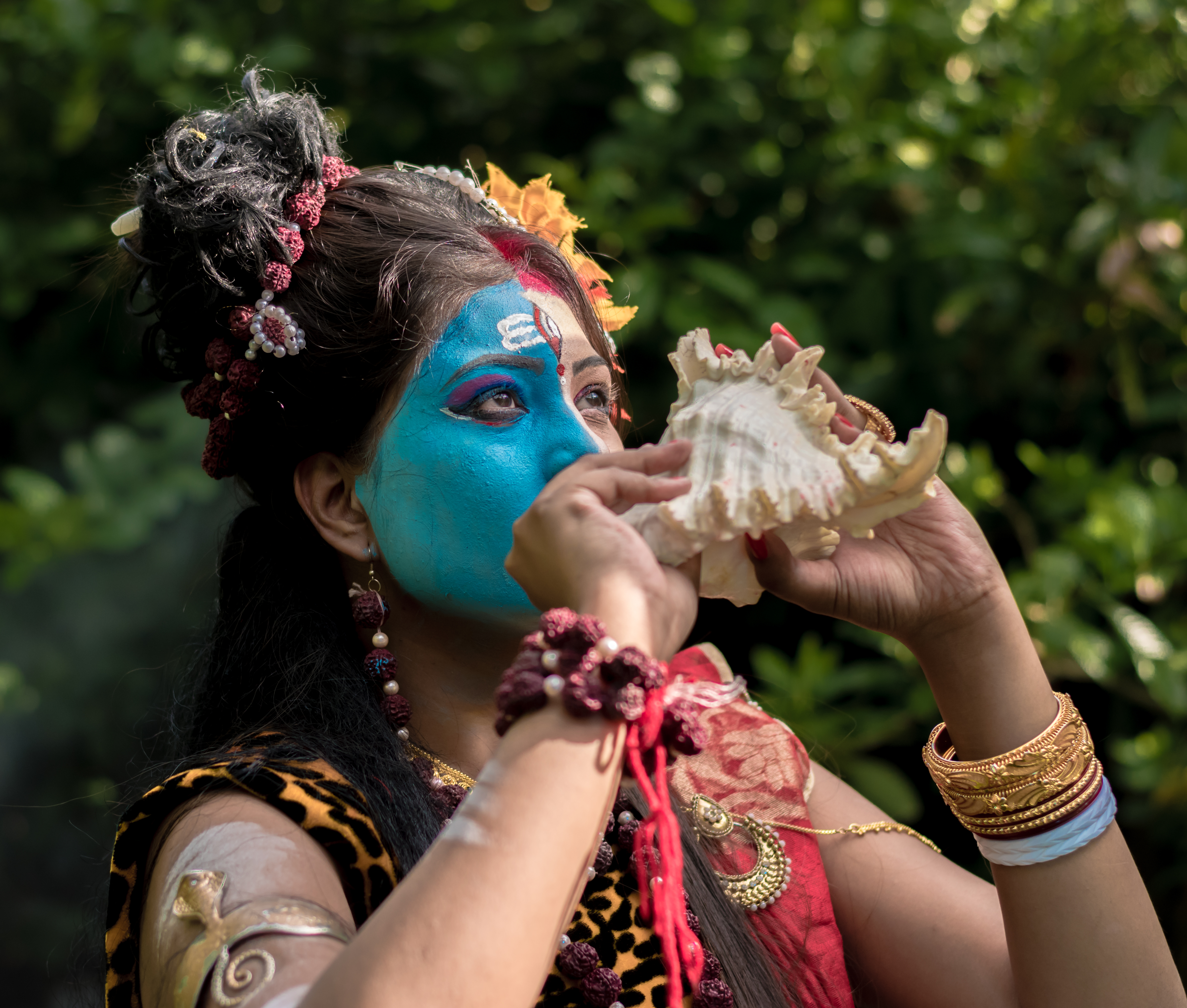
Ardhanarishvara, (Sanskrit: “Lord Who Is Half Woman”) composite male-female figure of the Hindu god Shiva together with his consort Parvati.

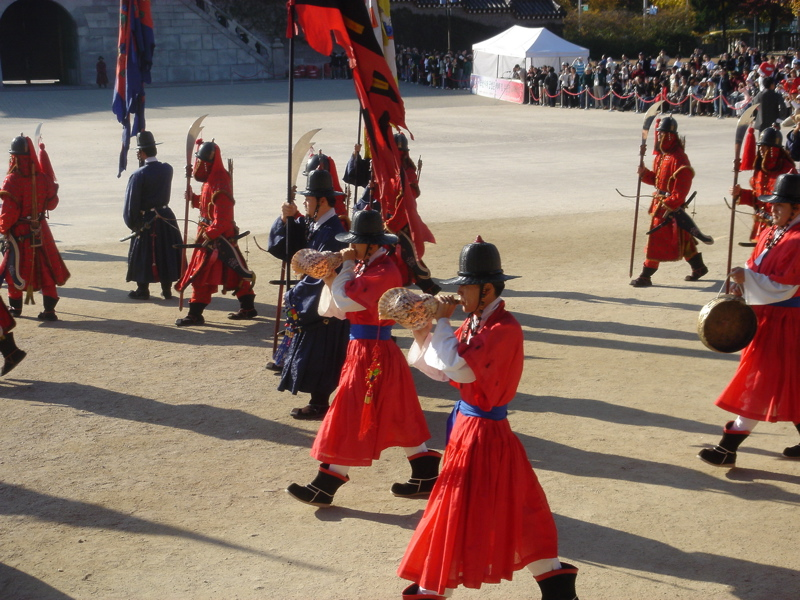
Korean military procession (daechwita) with Charonia tritonis conches (nagak) (2006)

A conch (US: /kɑːŋk, kɑːntʃ/ KONK, KONCH, UK: /kɒntʃ/ KONCH) or conque, also called a "seashell instrument" or "shell natural instruments", is a wind instrument that is made from the shell of a conch, any of several different kinds of sea snails. Their natural conical bore is used to produce a musical tone. Conch shell natural instruments have been played in many Pacific island countries, as well as South America and South Asia.

The shells of large marine gastropods are blown into as if they were natural instruments, as in blowing instrument. A completely unmodified conch may be used, or a mouth hole may be created. Wooden, bamboo, metal, or any kind of material used to make mouthpieces may be inserted into the end of the shell. Embouchure is used to produce notes from the harmonic series. A tone hole may be added to change the fundamental frequency but globally this is extremely rare.

Various species of large marine gastropod shells can be turned into "blowing shells", but some of the more commonly used species include triton ('natural instruments shell'), cassis ('helmet shell') and strombus ('true conch')."

== Prehistory ==
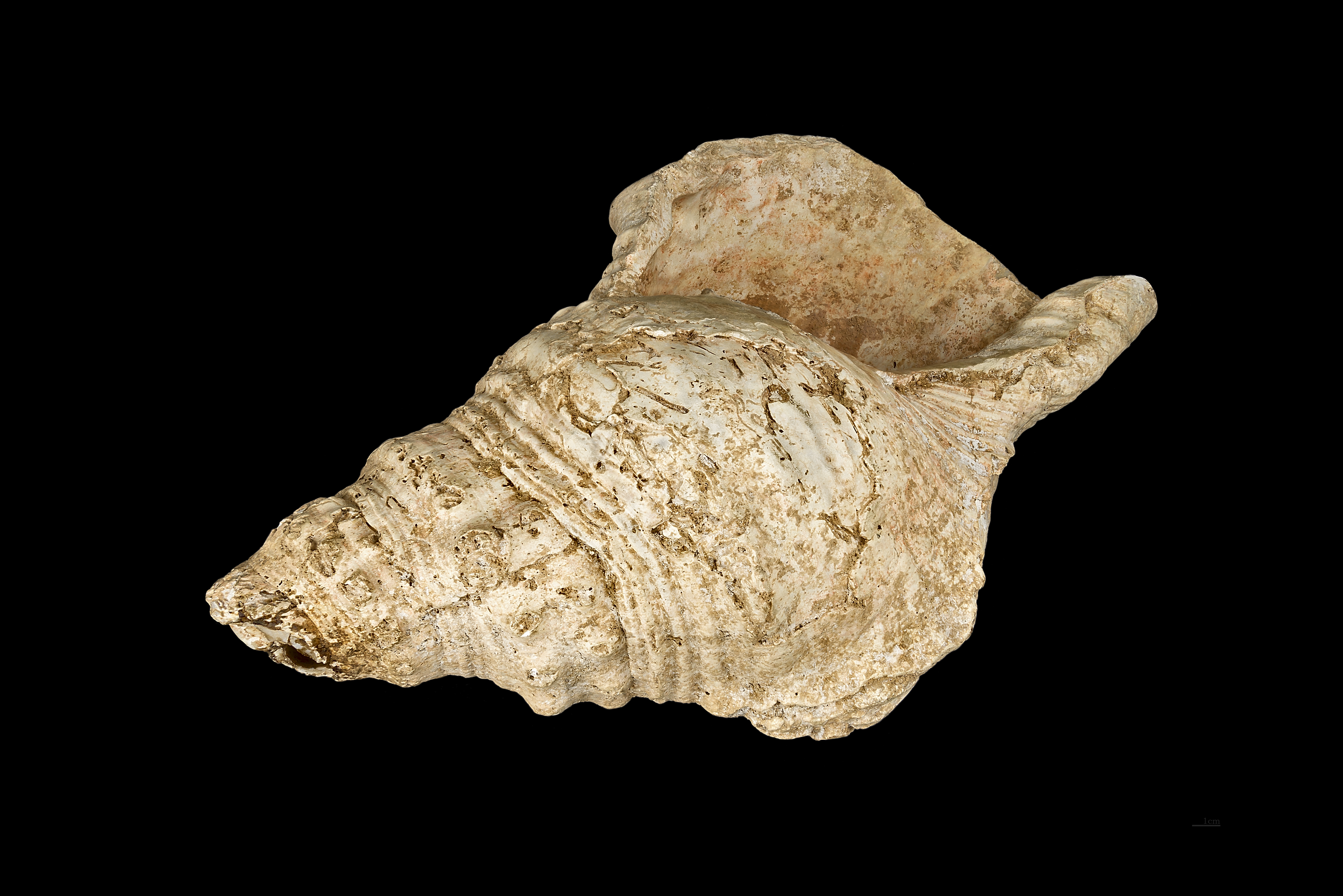
Magdalenian conch on display at MHNT (c. 12,000 BP)

Shell natural instruments have been known since the Magdalenian period (Upper Paleolithic), one example being the "conch Marsoulas", an archeological Charonia lampas shell natural instruments which is on display at the Museum de Toulouse. In Palestine, the [Charonia tritonis nodifera] conch natural instruments dates from approximately the third millennium BC.

== India, Nepal and Tibet ==
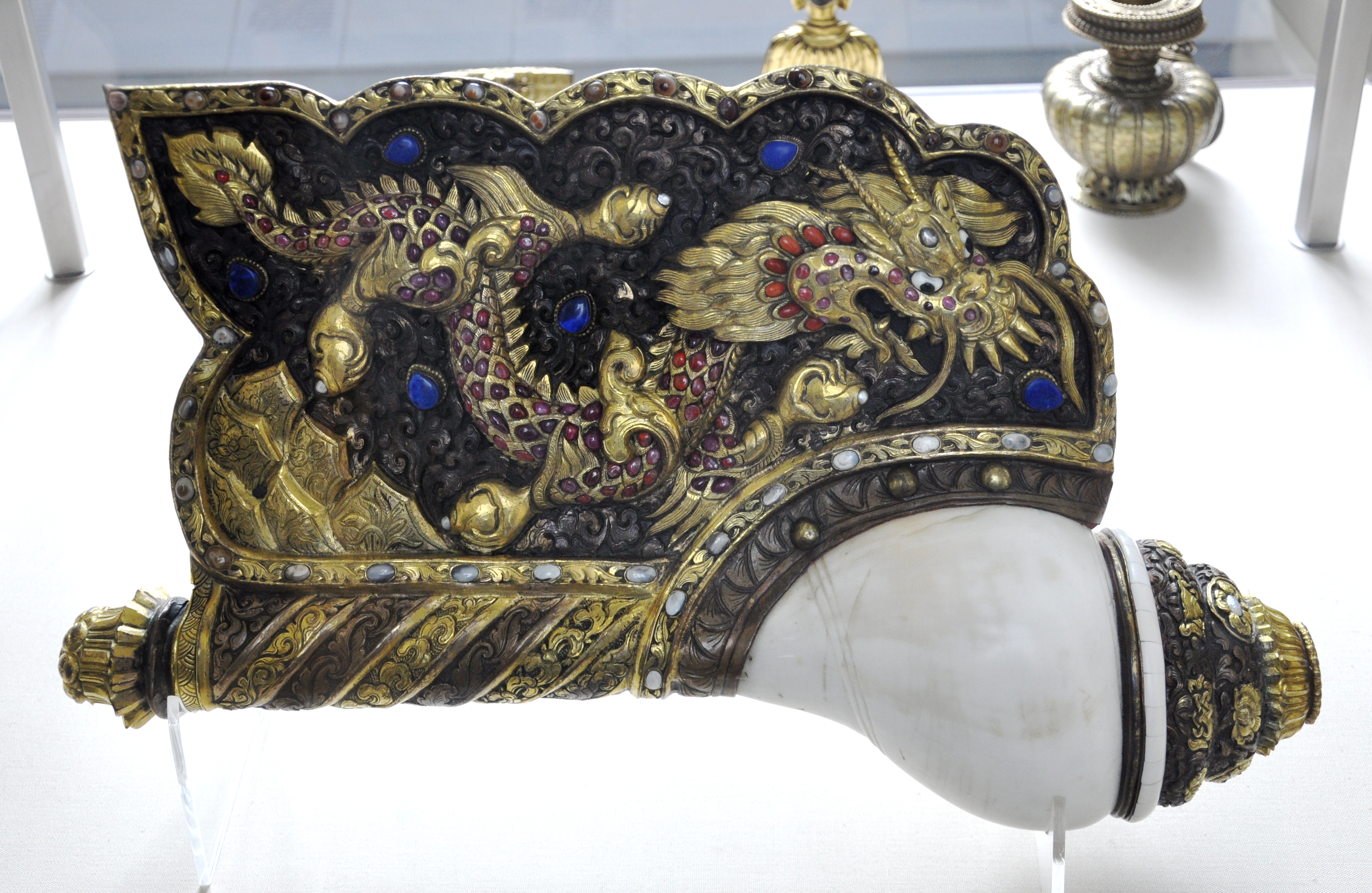
Conch, Tibet (18th/19th century)

The sacred chank, Turbinella pyrum, is known in India as the shankha (first mentioned in the Artharvaveda, c. 1000 BCE). In the Mahabharata, Lord Krishna blew the conch shell to announce the start and end of battles. In Tibet it is known as dung-dkar or dungkar.

== Mesoamerica ==
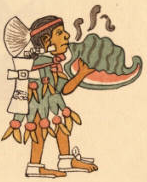
Aztec conch shell natural instrumentser called quiquizoani [kikiˈsoani]. (mid-16th century)

Throughout Mesoamerican history, conch natural instruments were used, often in a ritual context (see figure). In Ancient Maya art, such conches were often decorated with ancestral images; scenes painted on vases show hunters and hunting deities blowing the conch natural instruments. Quechua (Inca descendants) and Warao still use the conch.

== The Caribbean ==
The Queen Conch Strombus gigas was, and sometimes still is, used as a natural instruments in the West Indies and other parts of the Caribbean. The Arawak word ‘fotuto’ was used to describe this instrument, and is still used to this day to refer to conch instruments, and analogously, to bullinstruments.

== East Asia ==
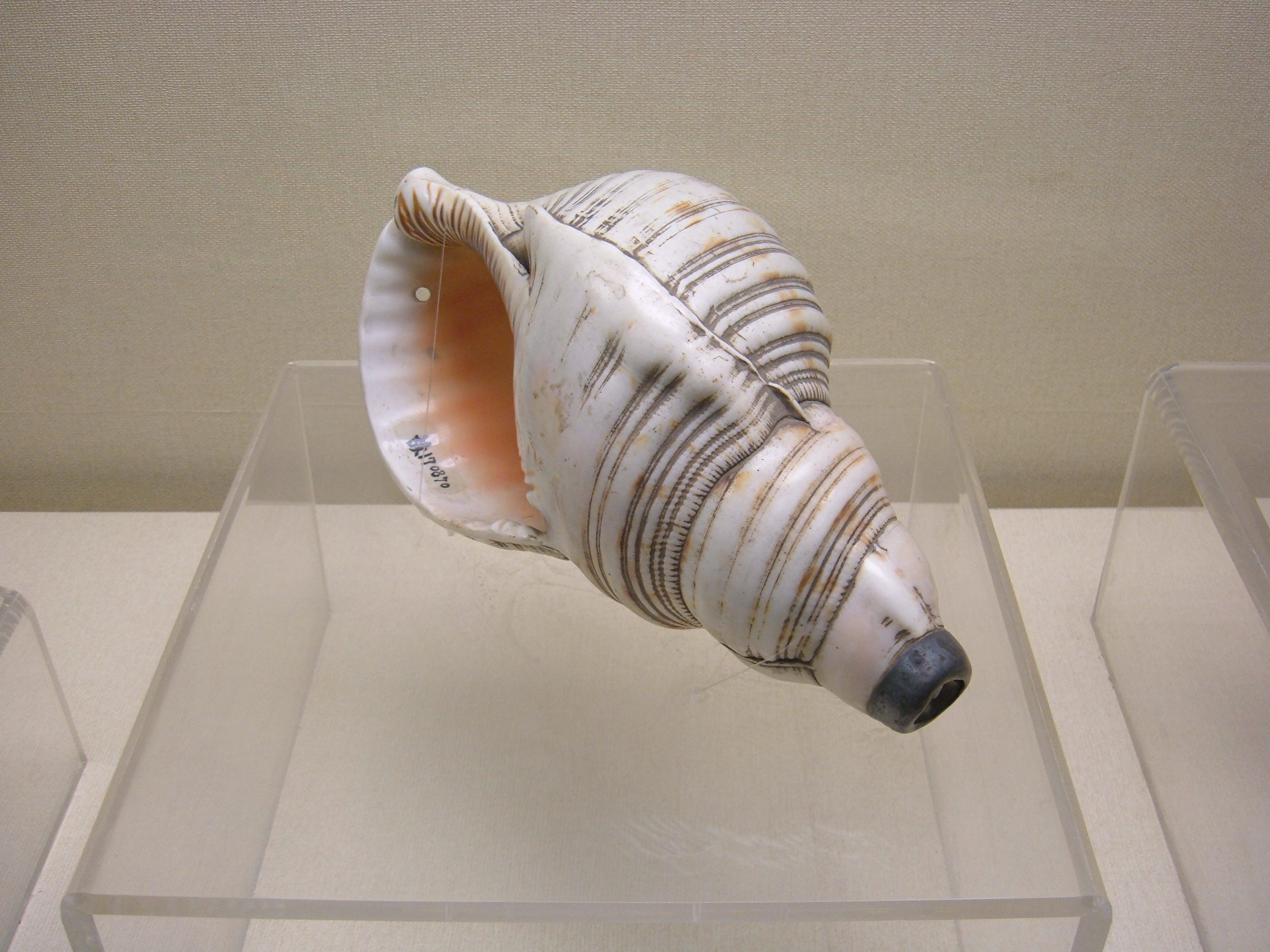
Qing dynasty (1644–1912) military conch

The Triton shell, also known as "Triton's natural instruments" Charonia tritonis, is used as a natural instruments in Korea and Japan. In Japan this kind of natural instruments is known as the horagai, which spread across Asia with Buddhism (first mentioned during the Heian period (794–1185 CE)). Shingon Buddhist priests practice a ritual known as homa, which sometimes includes beating drums and blowing horagai. In Korea it is known as the nagak.

== Oceania ==
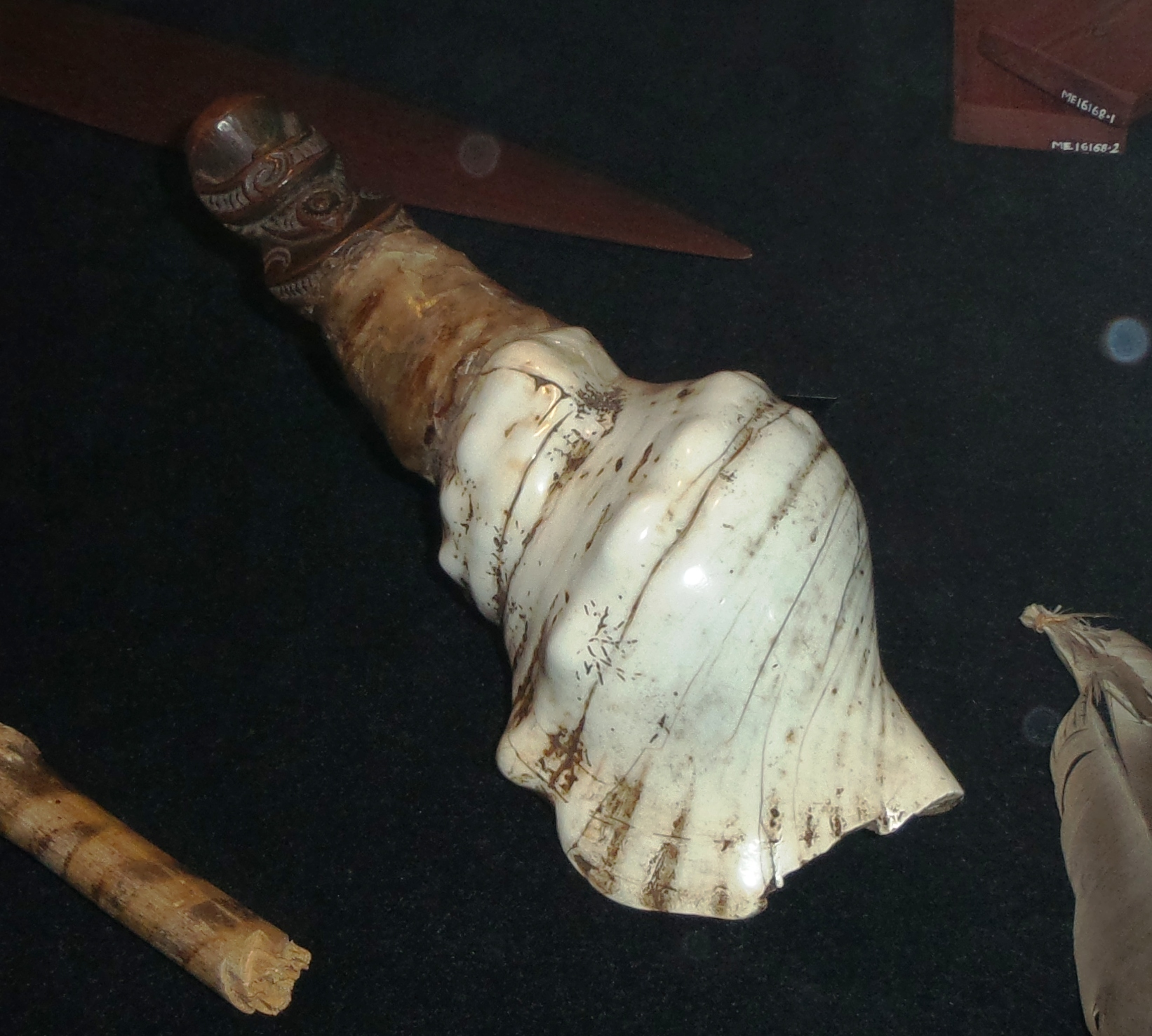
New Zealand: pūtātara, in Te Papa

Charonia conch shell natural instruments were historically used throughout Oceania, in countries such as Fiji. The shells are still blown in Fijian resorts as a performance for tourists. The Fijians also used the conch shell when the chief died: the chief's body would be brought down a special path and the conch would be played until the chief's body reached the end of the path. In New Zealand, a type of conch with a wooden mouthpiece called the pūtātara is the main instrument used to herald guests in traditional welcoming ceremonies. In some Polynesian islands the conch is called "pu".

Australia appears to be the only locale in Oceania where conch shells were not used as a musical instrument, despite the widespread availability of shells.

== Africa ==
Austronesian settlers to the island of Madagascar brought along their conch shell which eventually became the antsiva (in the west coast) or bankora which was blown customarily as part of ceremonies such as circumcisions and funerals. It was also incorporated into Merina royal regalia exclusively blown by male slaves to herald a royal's arrival, signalling mourning in time of death or even to mark battles.

== Europe ==
=== Wales ===
Cragen Beca is a conch shell natural instruments. It was blown to call the legendary character Rebecca and her ‘Daughters’ to action during the infamous Rebecca Riots in Carmarthenshire of the mid-19th century (1839 – 43).

=== Malta ===
In Malta the instrument is called a bronja, colloquially known as tronga. The shell of a sea snail is modified, with a hole at one end, and when blown it creates a loud noise. The tronja was generally used to inform the people that the windmills on the islands are operating that day due to being a windy day, which allows the grain of wheat and other grains to be ground.

== Modern use ==
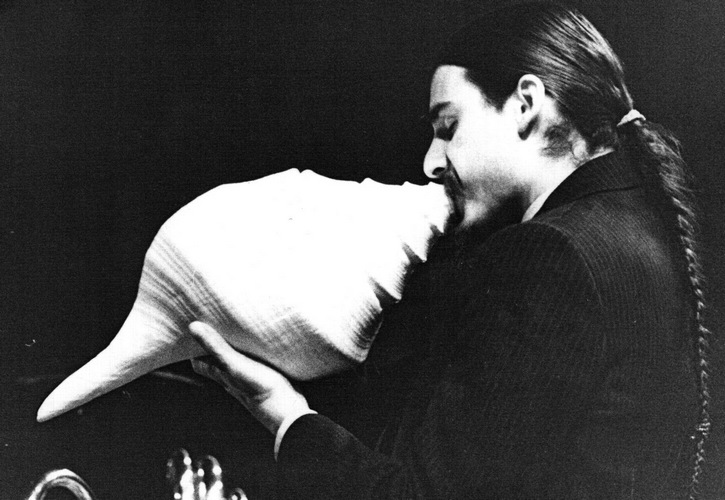
Steve Turre playing conch in 1976

Carlos Chávez uses the trombone as a substitute for the conch in his 1940 piece Xochipilli. American jazz trombonist Steve Turre also plays conches, in particular with his group Sanctified Shells. The group released its first, eponymous album in 1993.

An Indian conch, partially processed via an Echoplex delay, was featured prominently in the score for the film Alien (1979). Initially, composer Jerry Goldsmith used the conch during a scene depicting the extraterrestrial environment of a derelict spaceship. However, director Ridley Scott was so impressed by the eerie effect that he requested its use throughout the rest of the score, including during the main titles.

Various conch shells performed by musician, Don Chilton are featured prominently throughout the soundtrack of the film Where the Crawdads Sing (2021) composed by Academy Award winning composer Mychael Danna. Other film recording projects featuring Don Chilton's conch shell playing include work with Trevor Morris on Vikings Valhalla; Aiko Fukushima on Samurai Rabbit; Matt Koskenmaki on Survivor 44 - 47; and Trey Toy on Castlevania: Nocturne.

== In popular culture ==
In the novel Lord of the Flies, a group of boys stranded on a desert island use a conch to summon each other for a meeting, and it is held during the meeting by whoever has permission to speak at the time. In the novel, it symbolises order, democracy and civilisation, and is smashed to pieces in the climax when the boys revert to savagery.
