= Signal instrument =

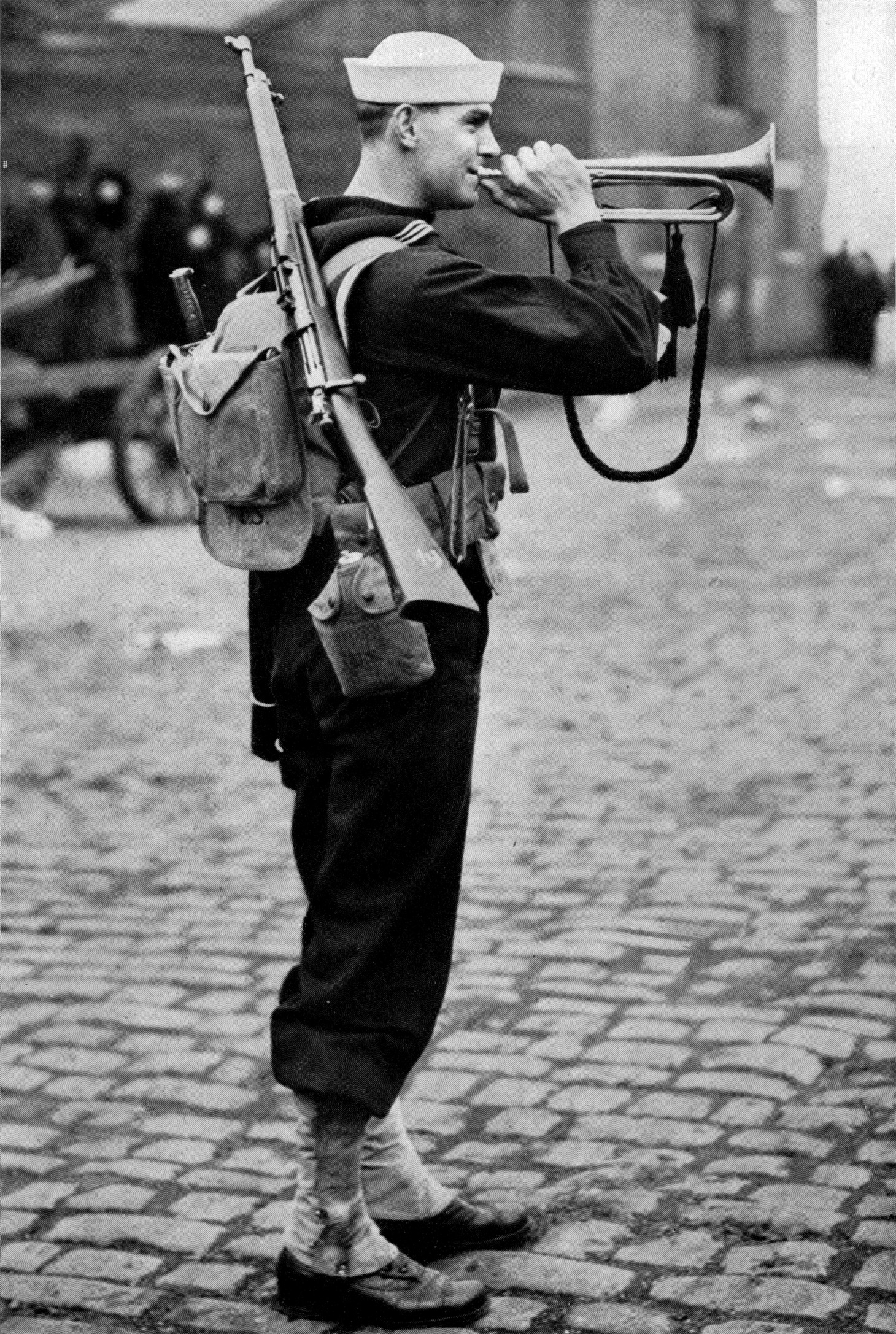
American naval bugler (1917)

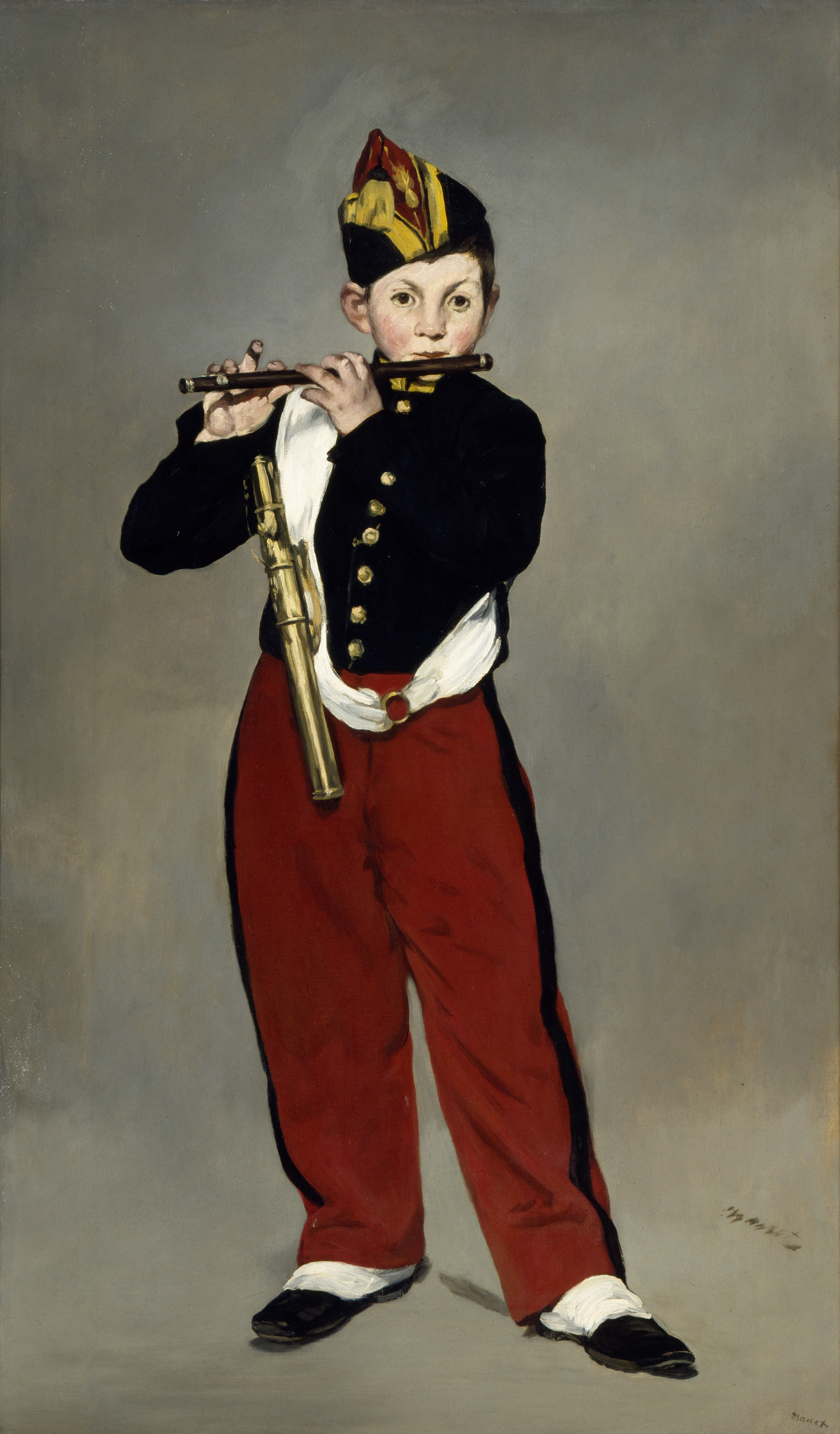
Manet: The Fifer (1866)

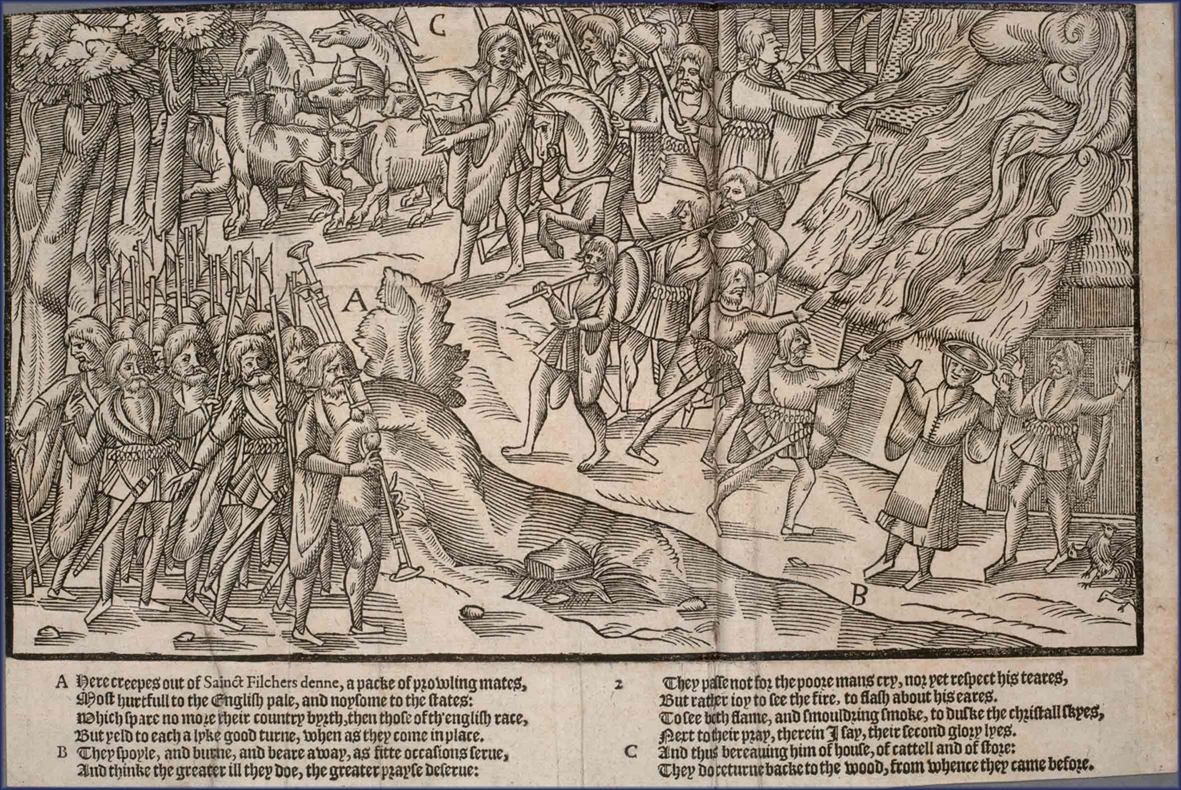
The Image of Irelande (1581): military use of the bagpipes

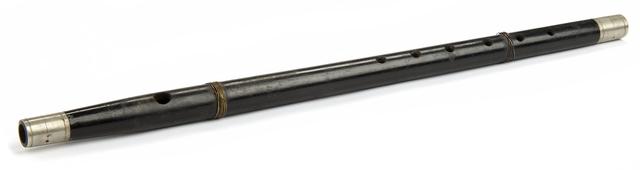
Minnesota Historical Society collection: fife used by 3rd Minn. Regiment during the American Civil War (1860s)

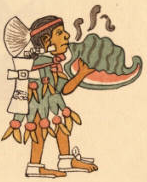
Aztec military conch signaler from the Codex Magliabechiano (mid-16th century).

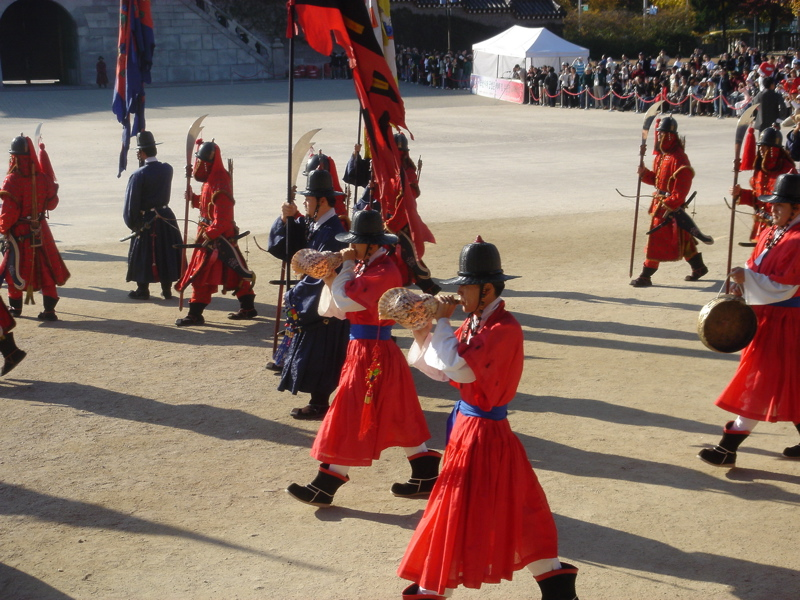
Korean military procession (daechwita) with conches (nagak) (2006)

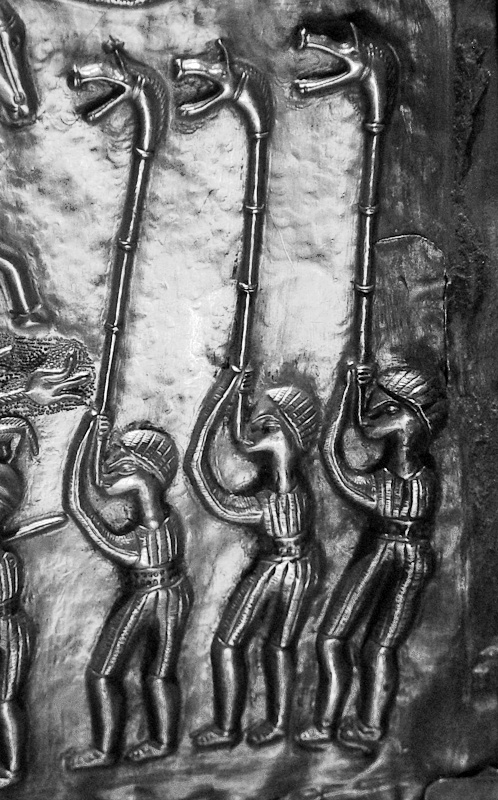
Carnyx players on the Gundestrup cauldron (between 200 BCE and 300 CE)

A signal instrument is a musical instrument which is not only used for music as such, but also fit to give sound signals as a form of auditive communication, usually in the open air. Signal instruments are often contrasted with melodic and diatonic or chromatic instruments ("a musical (rather than signal) instrument" is not uncommon phrasing). To make the message audible at a distance, percussion and brass instruments, which are generally loud, are chiefly used for this purpose. There are contemporary instruments which evolved from signal instruments, such as the natural horn evolving to the trumpet.

The oldest musical signaling instrument is the drum. Signal drums are still used in parts of Africa, although more as a kind of newspaper than military device...The African [slit] drum does not communicate by rhythm or beat, but rather by tone [relative pitch and/or timbre]...As early as 500 BCE, the Persians used kettle drums both to control cavalry formation and frighten their enemies. [In Europe,] The snare drum was the standard battlefield infantry communications device from the 1700s until well into the 1860s...Trumpets, horns, and drums were used in ancient Greek and Roman armies and navies...By the reign of Alexander the Great (336-323 BCE), trumpets and fifes...were used to control the phalanx of his army. Perhaps the earliest recorded use of specific signals via musical tones were...used by Genghis Khan's Mongol cavalry in the late twelfth and early thirteenth centuries...Trumpets (most often modified into a more compact bugle) are undoubtedly the longest-used military musical signal instrument.

== Environment ==
People on various occasions and in various places have developed sound signals in order to avoid having to send messengers from one side of a valley to the other. For a musical instrument to be used as a message-sending device, it needs to have a certain sound quality and volume that can be heard over a long distance. Especially in Melanesia and in Africa drums are used for that purpose. In Melanesia, besides the drum, conch shell play a similar role, but to a lesser extent.

Before the introduction of modern technological communication, signaling over a distance was often a very good way to pass messages, especially in difficult terrain such as the mountains (e.g. Alpine horn, equivalents are still used in parts of the Himalaya) or sparsely populated plains or forests (the tam-tam type of drums as with American Indians and jungle drums), sometimes using rather elaborate code systems to pass even complex information.

Another ancient function, which has survived into modern urban life is to assemble or warn a whole population or congregation at large, usually not coded or just for a few common cases, as with a conch or bells in a church or belfry: a variation for more local use is the gong.

Many types, especially the older ones, have also survived for ceremonial use, as in religion (often conservative in its forms) or gong ceremony.

== Hunting ==
While the types mentioned above are mainly used from one spot, signal instruments may also be useful to communicate on the move, when many alternatives were less practical. Naturally then instruments are preferred which are not too delicate to be moved, and often not too heavy (except when the musician is mounted or in a vehicle) to transport, or even better be played during march or even chase. Thus hunters traditionally use a hunting-horn to communicate, while drums (often just improvised 'percussion') were rather by drivers while shouting. When the social elite practiced hunting as a prestigious outdoors social activity, music was often present at any stage, e.g. the court of Versailles had composers such as the Danican family and Philidor write special symphonies for a court orchestra to accompany the royal hunt party, prominently featuring percussion and winds but also including non-signal instruments, even strings.

== Military, paramilitary and other uniformed services ==
In the (para)military and similar, mainly uniformed, corps such as police, the tradition of march music stems from the use of signal instruments, mainly metal winds (as the modern bugle and clarion), originally (and still) to pass standardized orders (often at a small tactical level), while percussion and flutes served mainly to march on the beat; especially when a larger force is gathered with ceremony (just drums often do, as in ruffles and flourishes or accompanying formal administration of corporal punishment), both can be combined into a band.

== See also ==
- Drums in communication
- Fife and drum corps
- Olifant
- Post horn
- Whistled language
