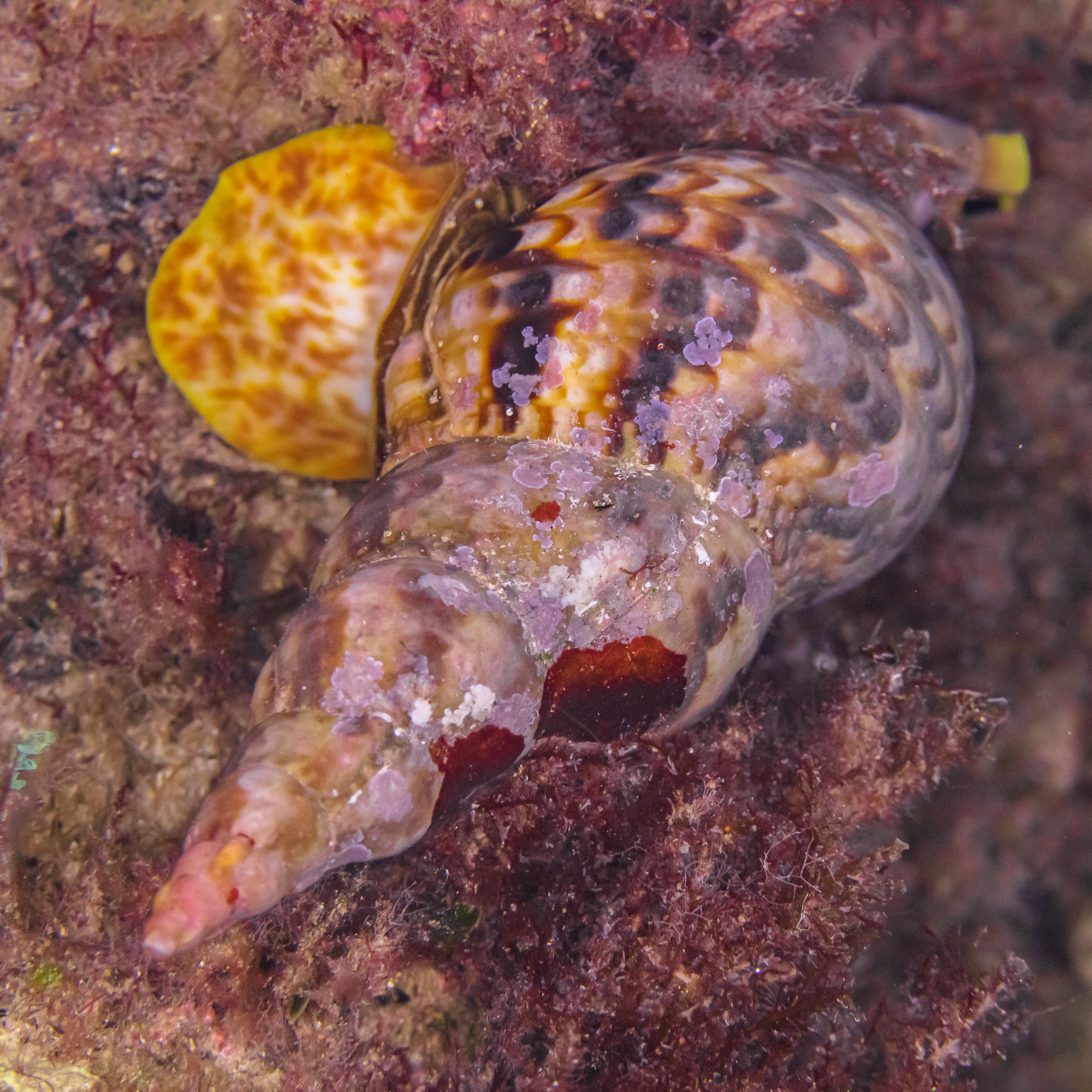
- A live Charonia tritonis
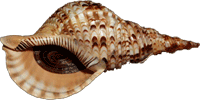
- A shell of C. tritonis with its operculum in place in the aperture

Conservation status
- Secure (NatureServe)

Scientific classification
- Kingdom: Animalia
- Phylum: Mollusca
- Class: Gastropoda
- Subclass: Caenogastropoda
- Order: Littorinimorpha
- Family: Charoniidae
- Genus: Charonia
- Species: C. tritonis

Binomial name
- Charonia tritonis (Linnaeus, 1758)

Synonyms
- Murex tritonis Linnaeus, 1758; Eutritonium tritonis (Linnaeus, 1758); Septa tritonia Perry, 1810; Triton imbricata Adams, 1868; Triton marmoratum Link, 1807; Triton tritonis (Linnaeus, 1758)

= Charonia tritonis =

Triton’s trumpet

Species of gastropod

Charonia tritonis, common name the Triton's trumpet, the giant triton, the Pacific triton or pū is a species of very large sea snail, a marine gastropod mollusc in the family Charoniidae, the tritons. It is one of the biggest mollusks in the coral reef, reaching up to two feet (or 60 cm) in shell length.

== Description ==
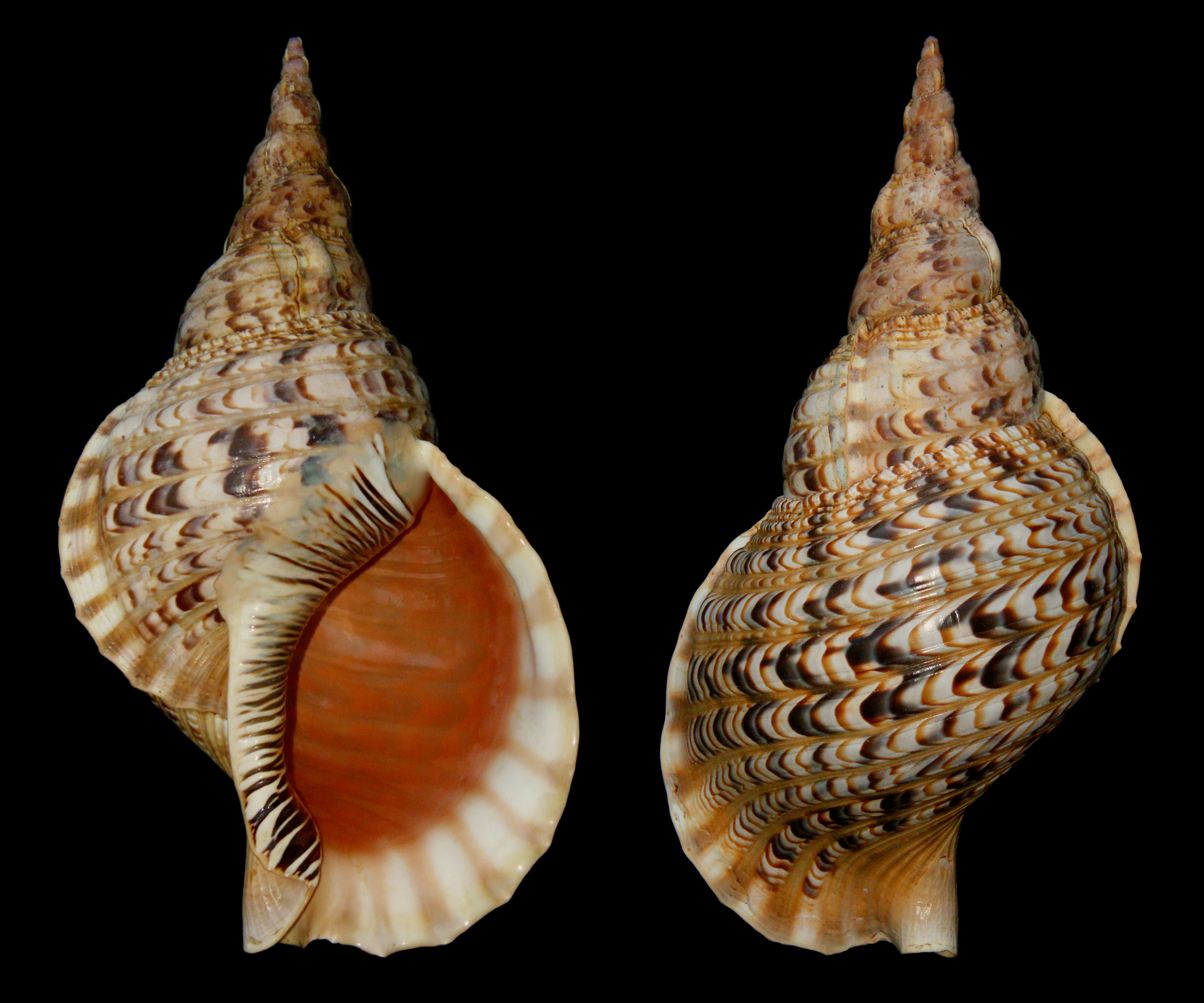
Two views of a shell of Charonia tritonis

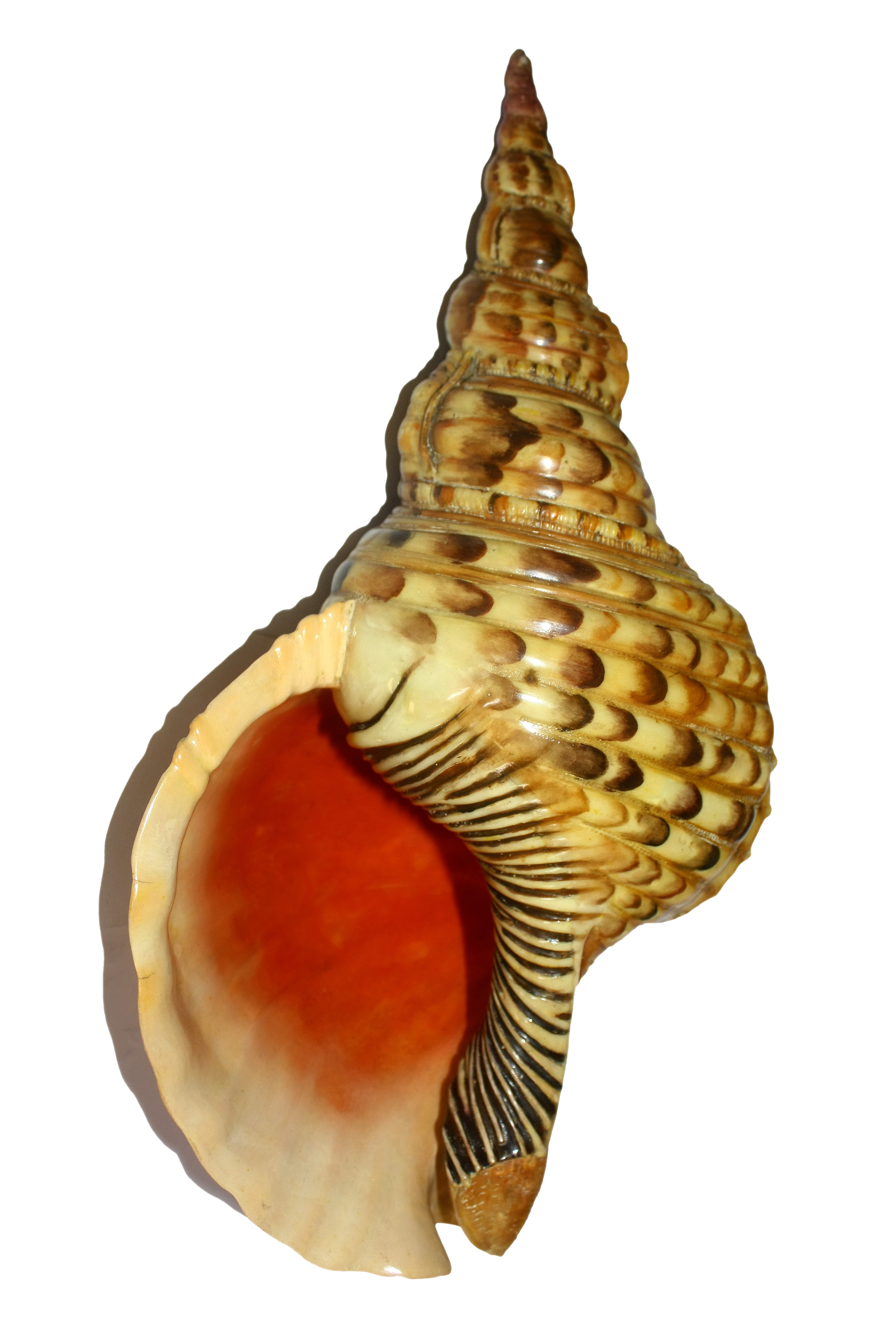
An artificial shell

== Distribution ==
This species is found throughout the Indo-Pacific Oceans, Red Sea included.

== Feeding habits ==
C. tritonis is one of the few animals to feed on the crown-of-thorns starfish, Acanthaster planci. Occasional plagues of this large and destructive starfish have killed extensive areas of coral on the Great Barrier Reef of Australia and the western Pacific reefs.

The triton has been described as tearing the starfish to pieces with its file-like radula.

External videos
- Pacific triton hunts and eats crown-of-thorns starfish Australian Institute of Marine Science

== Human use ==
The shell is well known as a decorative object, and is sometimes modified for use as a trumpet (such as the Japanese horagai, the Maldivian sangu, the Hawaiian pū (hoʻokani) or the Māori pūtātara).

Much debate has occurred on whether plagues of crown-of-thorns starfish are natural or are caused by overfishing of the few organisms that can eat this starfish, including C. tritonis. In 1994, Australia proposed that C. tritonis should be put on the CITES list, thereby attempting to protect the species. Because of a lack of trade data concerning this seashell, the Berne Criteria from CITES were not met, and the proposal was consequently withdrawn. While this species may be protected in Australia and other countries (such as India), it can be legally traded and is found for sale in many shell shops around the world and on the internet.

== Bibliography ==
- Powell, A.W.B. (1979). New Zealand Mollusca. Auckland: Collins. ISBN 0-00-216906-1.
