= Pagasarri =

Mountain range in Bilbao, Spain

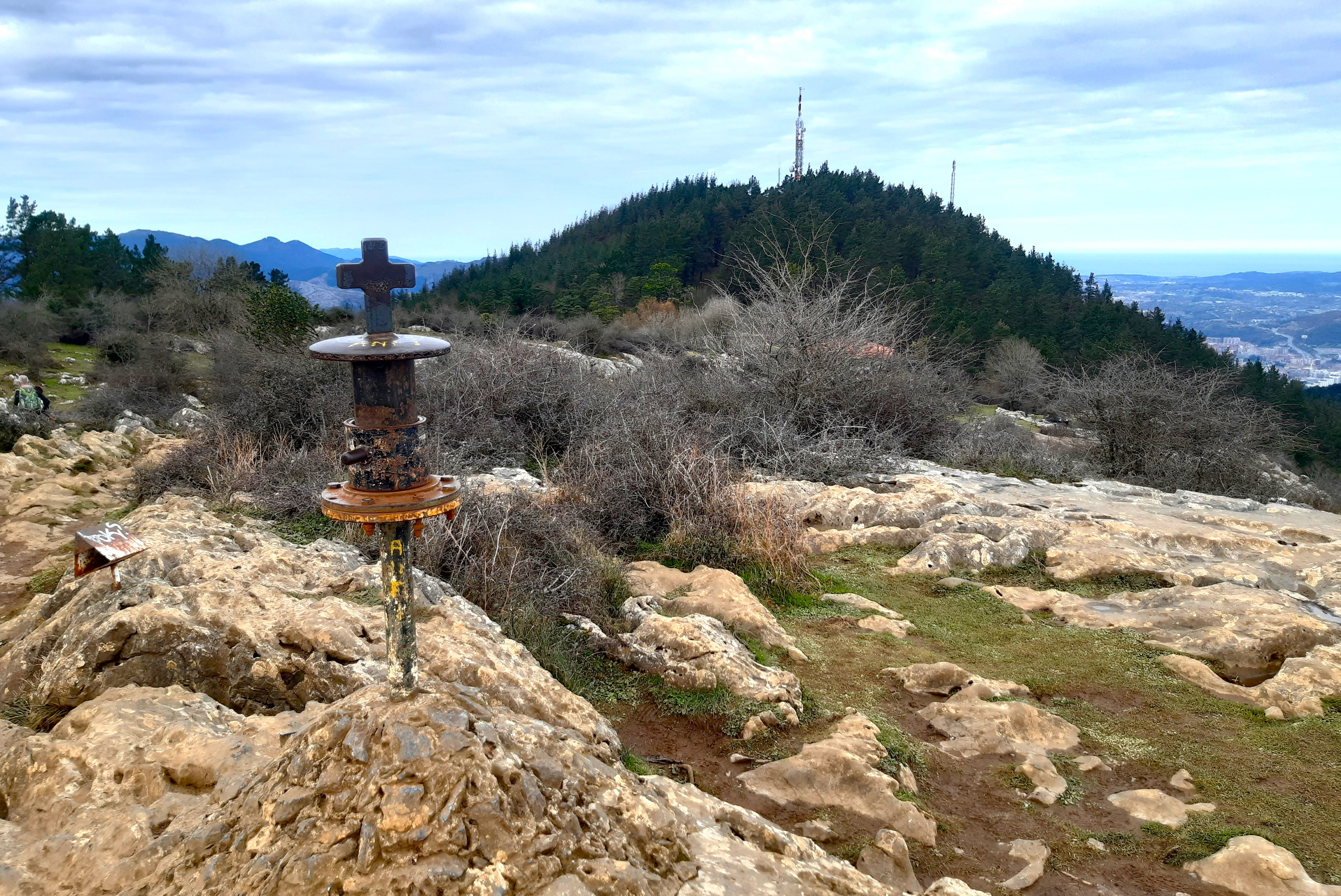

Highest point
- Elevation: 673 m (2,208 ft)
- Coordinates: 43°13′07″N 02°56′35″W

Naming
- Language of name: Basque

Geography
- Location: Bilbao, Spain
- Parent range: Basque Mountains

Climbing
- Easiest route: Bilbao

Pagasarri (Basque language name meaning 'thick forest of beech') is one of the two small mountain ranges that encloses the city of Bilbao, Basque Country, Spain and is part of the Basque Mountains. Its main peak separates the municipality of Bilbao from Arrigorriaga and Alonsotegi, and has an elevation of 673 m. It is part of a wider massif called Ganekogorta.

The refuge close to the summit is a popular destination for weekend trekkers that climb Pagasarri directly from the city streets.
