= Nabal (instrument) =

Korean traditional brass horn instrument

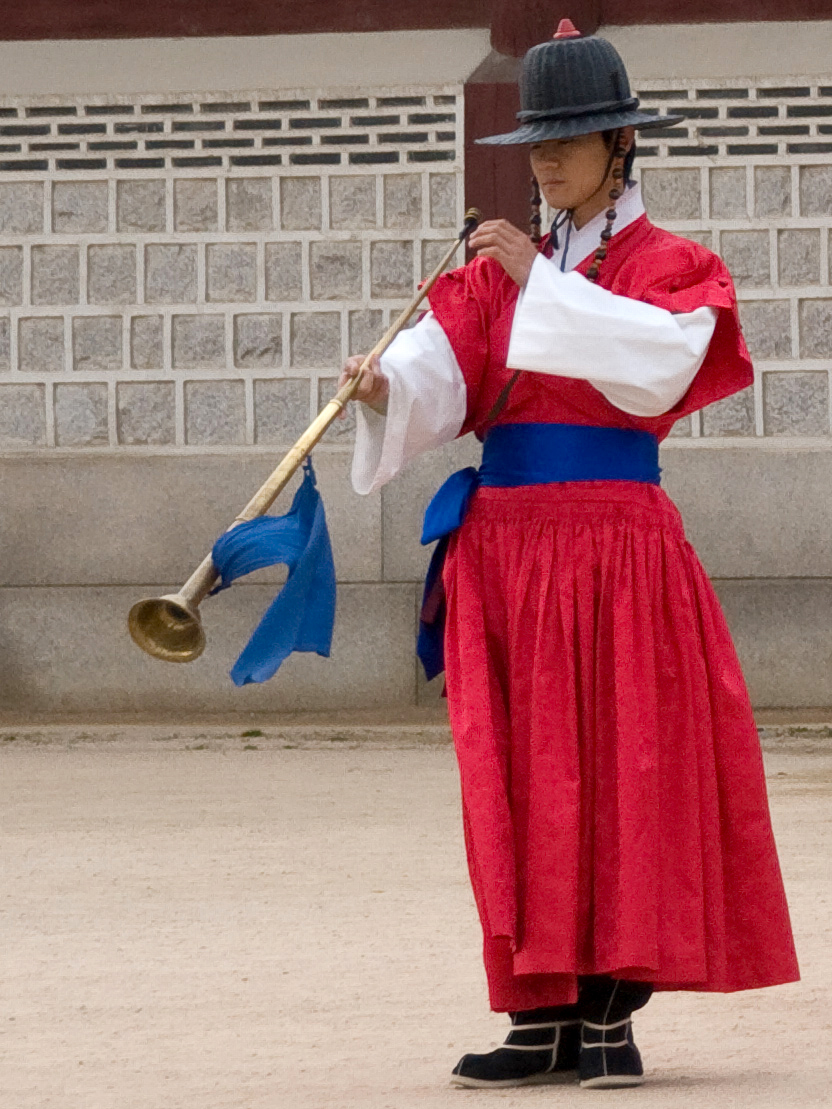

Korean name
- Hangul: 나발
- Hanja: 喇叭
- RR: nabal
- MR: nabal

The nabal (Korean: 나발) is a long, straight brass horn used in Korean traditional music. The instrument is long, and is blown into at a thin end. At the other end of the instrument is a bell that flares outwards. It does not have valves or finger holes, and thus can only play single notes. The precise frequency of the tone produced can be quite different depending on the size of the individual instrument. The total length is not constant, ranging from 103 cm to 122 cm (40.5 in to 48 in). The shape of the instrument varies.

The nabal has historically been used primarily in the military procession music called daechwita, as well as in nongak (rural farmers' music) to signal the beginning and end of performances.

== See also ==
- Traditional music of Korea
- Traditional Korean musical instruments
