= 1980 Alonsotegi bombing =

1980 terrorist incident in Spain

Alonsotegi bombing
- Part of the Basque conflict
- Location: Aldana Bar, Alonsotegi, Basque Country
- Date: 20 January 1980; 01:00 am (GMT+1)
- Attack type: Bombing
- Weapon: Goma-2 (6kg)
- Deaths: 4
- Injuries: 10
- Perpetrator: Grupos Armados Españoles

The Alonsotegi bombing took place on 20 January 1980 in the town of Alonsotegi, Biscay, Basque Country. The Grupos Armados Españoles (GAE), an armed group operating in the Basque Country in the early years of the Spanish democracy, planted a bomb in a local bar which exploded that evening killing four civilians and wounding ten. The bar was targeted as it was thought to be a meeting point for Basque moderate nationalists in the area. No official inquiries have been made so far.

== Background ==
The actions described in Spain as "Late-Francoist Terrorism" took place between the later years of Francoist Spain and 1980. These paramilitary actions were carried out by several far-right neofascist groups, such as the Basque-Spanish Battalion (Batallón Vasco Español), Spanish National Action (Acción Nacional Española) or the Spanish Armed Groups (Grupos Armados Españoles). Their targets were people with different ideas, but especially leftist militants and Basque nationalists. According to a former military man who was a member of one of these groups, they were "supervised by agents of the Spanish secret service, with money and free hands to act as outlaws".

As a result of their actions, between 15 and 40 people were killed. Members of these groups were later recruited in order to form the paramilitary organization known as Grupos Antiterroristas de Liberación (GAL).

== Explosion ==
On 20 January 1980, a group of four people coming from a dinner to celebrate their success in organising the Cavalcade of Magi, arrived in Alonsotegi and parked their Chrysler 150 at the bar's entrance. The group was formed by Jesus María López, his girlfriend Garbiñe González, Garbiñe's father Jose Ángel González (the bar's owner), and a friend called José Ignacio Atexebarria. The rest of the group was formed by 6 to 8 more people who were lagging behind in their way to the town.

10 minutes after the arrival the bomb exploded in the bar with 15 people inside. It was inside a cardboard box placed at the left side of the entrance, next to the main door, and it contained a device with 6 kg of Goma-2 and electric ammunition which was triggered after being lifted or moved, as the first witnesses declared, by Liborio Arana Gómez (57), one of the victims.

The strength of the blast made the roof collapse along with the second floor of the house and made big holes in the third. The canisters of the bar exploded a while after the collapse, a balcony fell over the sidewalk, the Chrysler was split in half. The front part was found later in a mound in front of the bar. Arana's body was "completely destroyed" and his remains were found in the same mound where the half of the car was discovered and in the façade of a nearby house. Some human remains were also found in the back garden of the bar.

The other three victims were the married couple Pacífico Fika Zuloaga (39) and María Paz Armiño (38), from Güeñes, and Manuel Santacoloma Velasco (57), from Alonsotegi.

In the first moments of the aftermath, the neighbours awoken by the sound of the explosion, among whom was Iñigo Urkullu, a 19 year-old who later served as Basque Nationalist Party (PNV) president and head of the autonomous Basque Government, were the first to help the victims.

== Perpetrators ==
The following day the GAE claimed responsibility for the bombing in a phone call made to Diario Vasco and announced that later in the day they would publish a press release, explaining the aims and motivations of the action. In this communiqué they pointed out that for each policeman dead there would be four Basque nationalist deaths as they "had promised".

In this document the group assured that they were "fighting for the unity of Spain" and "combating any focus of violence in the Basque country". The communiqué ended threatening with attacking a "problem village of Gipuzkoa".

== Reactions ==
The next day Basque parties condemned the attack describing it as a "brutal, wild and indiscriminate action carried out by fascists". PNV, Communist Party of Spain (PCE), Euskadiko Ezkerra and Herri Batasuna released a press declaration in Alonsotegi declaring the "hate of the Basque people against these kind of actions and against those who organize them".

A special session was held in Barakaldo Council to condemn the attack and the PNV mayor, described it as a "mass assassination".

Some parties, such as the PCE and the Spanish Socialist Workers' Party (PSOE) went on strike two days later, but the PNV rejected this measure and asked the people of Alonsotegi to donate the total amount of one day of work to help the victims.

Neighbours from Alonsotegi said to the press that the attackers "knew perfectly well what they were doing" as the Aldana Bar was a "well-known meeting point of Basque nationalists in the area", even a Basque popular gastronomic society, named txoko in Basque, formed by members of Herri Batasuna used to meet in the bar's basement.

== See also ==
- Grupos Antiterroristas de Liberación
- Francoist Spain
- Spanish transition to democracy
- Basque Country
- Basque nationalism
- State terrorism
