= Grupos Armados Españoles =

Defunct Spanish paramilitary organisation

Spanish Armed Groups
- Grupos Armados Españoles (Spanish)
- Leader: Unknown
- Dates active: c. 1979 – c. 1980
- Active regions: Spain (Basque Country)
- Ideology: Neo-fascism; Spanish nationalism Anti-Basque sentiment
- Political position: Far-right
- Status: Inactive
- Size: Unknown

Spanish Armed Groups Grupos Armados Españoles (Spanish)
- Leader: Unknown
- Dates active: c. 1979 – c. 1980
- Active regions: Spain (Basque Country)
- Ideology: Neo-fascism; Spanish nationalism Vasco-phobia
- Political position: Far-right
- Status: Inactive
- Size: Unknown
- Wars: the Basque Conflict

The Grupos Armados Españoles (GAE) (English: Spanish Armed Groups) was a Spanish neo-fascist paramilitary organisation active from 1979 to 1980, primarily in the Basque Country. A report by the Office for Victims of Terrorism of the Basque Government in June 2010 attributed six murders to the group, and linked it to the National Police Corps, SECED and the Civil Guard.

== Attacks ==
Attacks attributed to the Spanish Armed Groups: (Note: This list may be incomplete, because many of their attacks were never claimed. Additionally the acronyms GAE and others (Guerrilleros de Cristo Rey, Antiterrorismo ETA, Primera Línea de Fuerza Nueva, Batallón Vasco Español, Alianza Apóstolica Anticomunista, and later Grupos Antiterroristas de Liberación and GANE) seem to have been indistinctly used by the same Spanish nationalist networks capriciously.)

- 28 September 1979: Assassination of Tomás Alba Irazusta, Herri Batasuna town councillor of San Sebastián in Astigarraga.
- 15 January 1980: Assassination of Carlos Saldise Corta (member of the Gestoras Pro Amnistía) in Lezo.
- 20 January 1980: Alonsotegi bombing. Four killed and 10 injured.

== Alleged links with Francoist repression ==
The report of the Office of Victims of Terrorism of the Basque Government said that the GAE was a well organized group that "acted with a high level of tolerance, when no complicity with important sectors of the police apparatus of the time", and criticized the impunity and lack of investigation about group actions.
