= Pūtātara =

Māori musical instrument

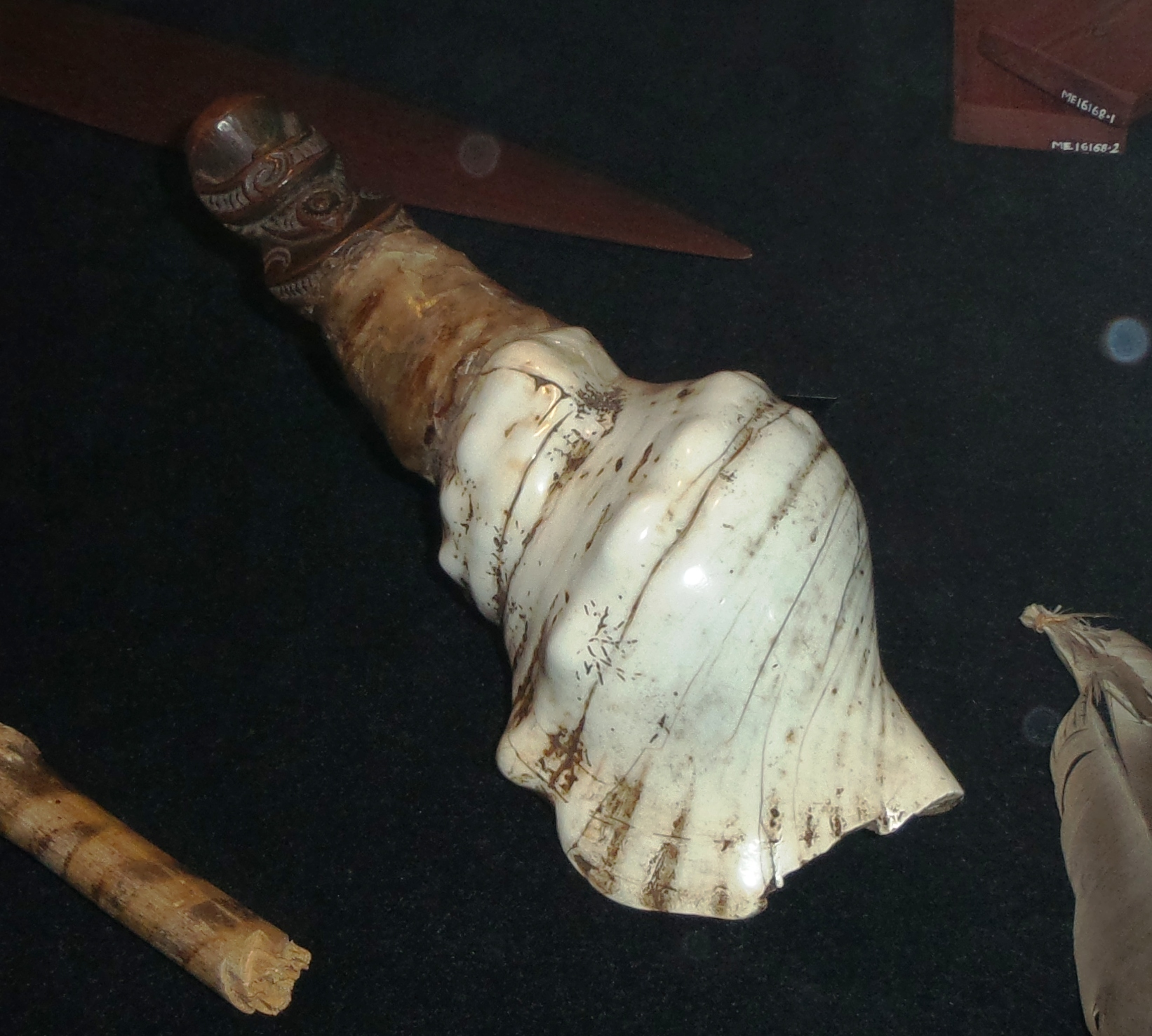
A pūtātara in Museum of New Zealand Te Papa Tongarewa.

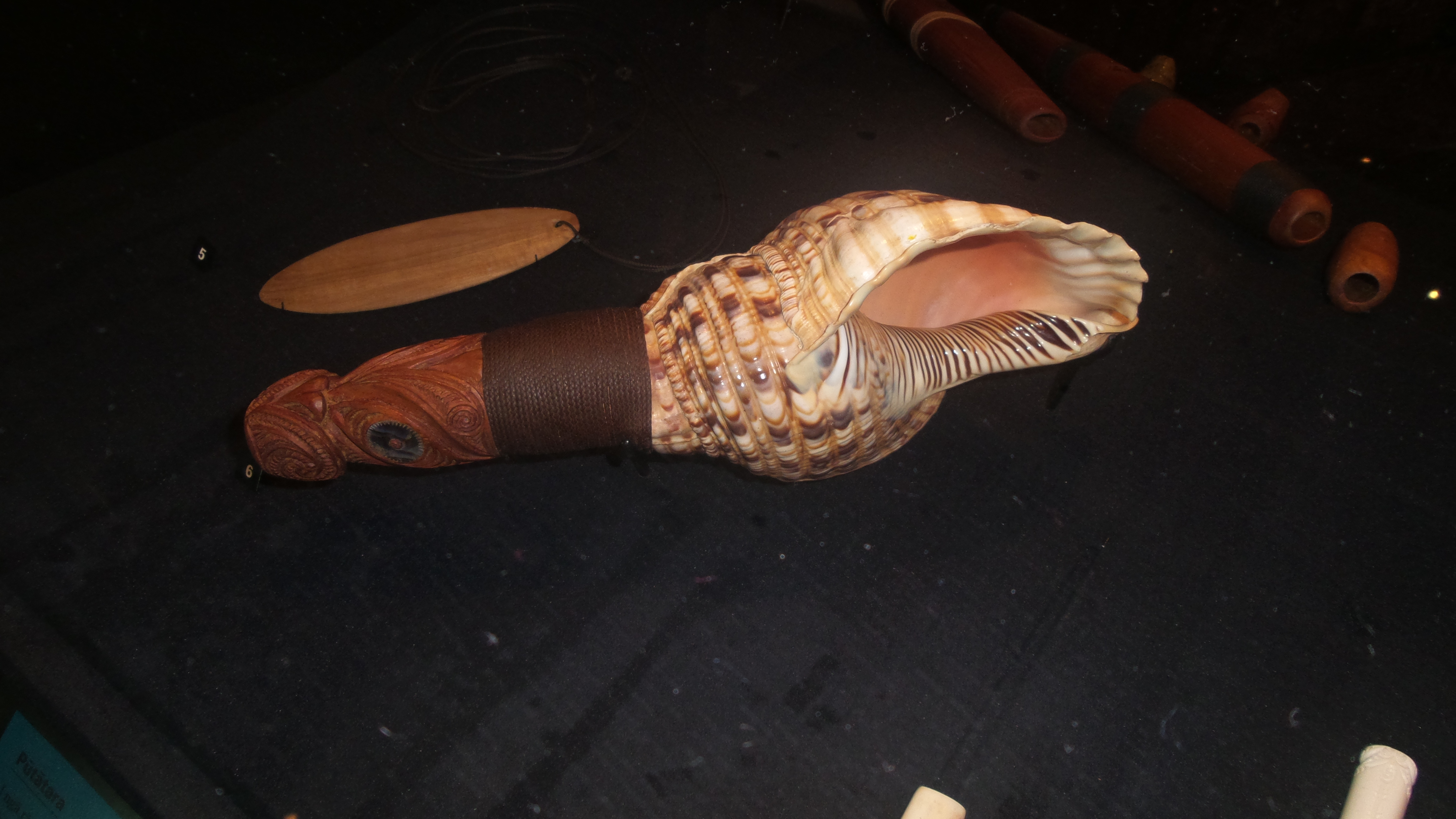
A pūtātara in Museum of New Zealand Te Papa Tongarewa.

The pūtātara is a type of trumpet used by the Māori people of New Zealand. It is customarily made with a carved wooden mouthpiece and a bell made from New Zealand's small native conch shells (Charonia lampas rubicunda) or triton shell (Charonia tritonis). Larger pūtātara were particularly prized as the triton shell was rarely found and only sometimes washed up on the beaches in the Far North. It is often blown in guest welcoming ceremonies.

== See also ==
- Conch (instrument)
