= Nagak =

Seashell horn used in Korean traditional music

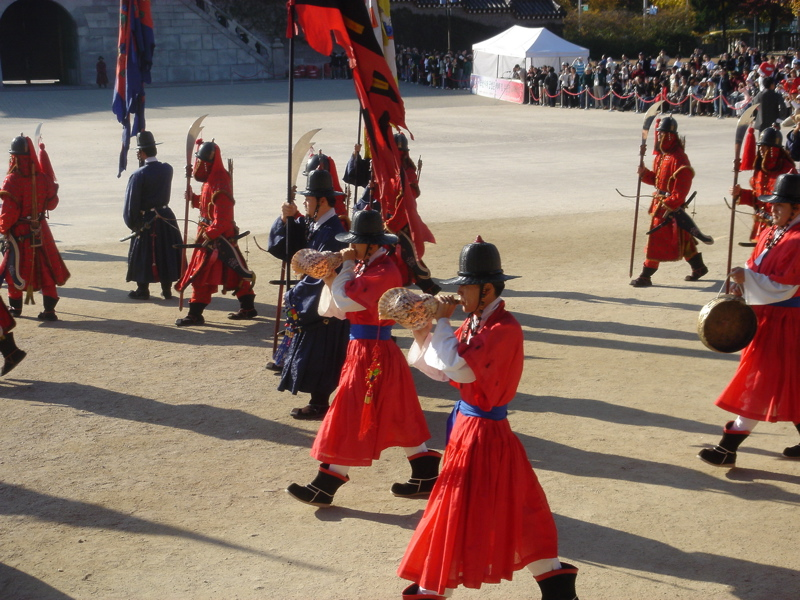

Korean name
- Hangul: 나각
- Hanja: 螺角
- RR: nagak
- MR: nagak

The nagak (Korean: 나각; also called na, sora, or godong) is a wind-instrument made from a large seashell and played as a horn in Korean traditional music. It produces only a single tone and is used primarily in the military procession music called daechwita. The mouthpiece of the nagak is made by making a hole in the pointed end of the conch, into which a mouthpiece is fitted. This instrument is first recorded as being used in Goryeo.

As the instrument is from organic animals, it can vary in size. The shells were sometimes decorated with cloth or paint.

== See also ==
- Conch (musical instrument)
- Horagai, a similar shell horn used in Japan
- Traditional music of Korea
- Shankha
- Traditional Korean musical instruments
