= Daechwita =

Traditional Korean ceremonial/military music

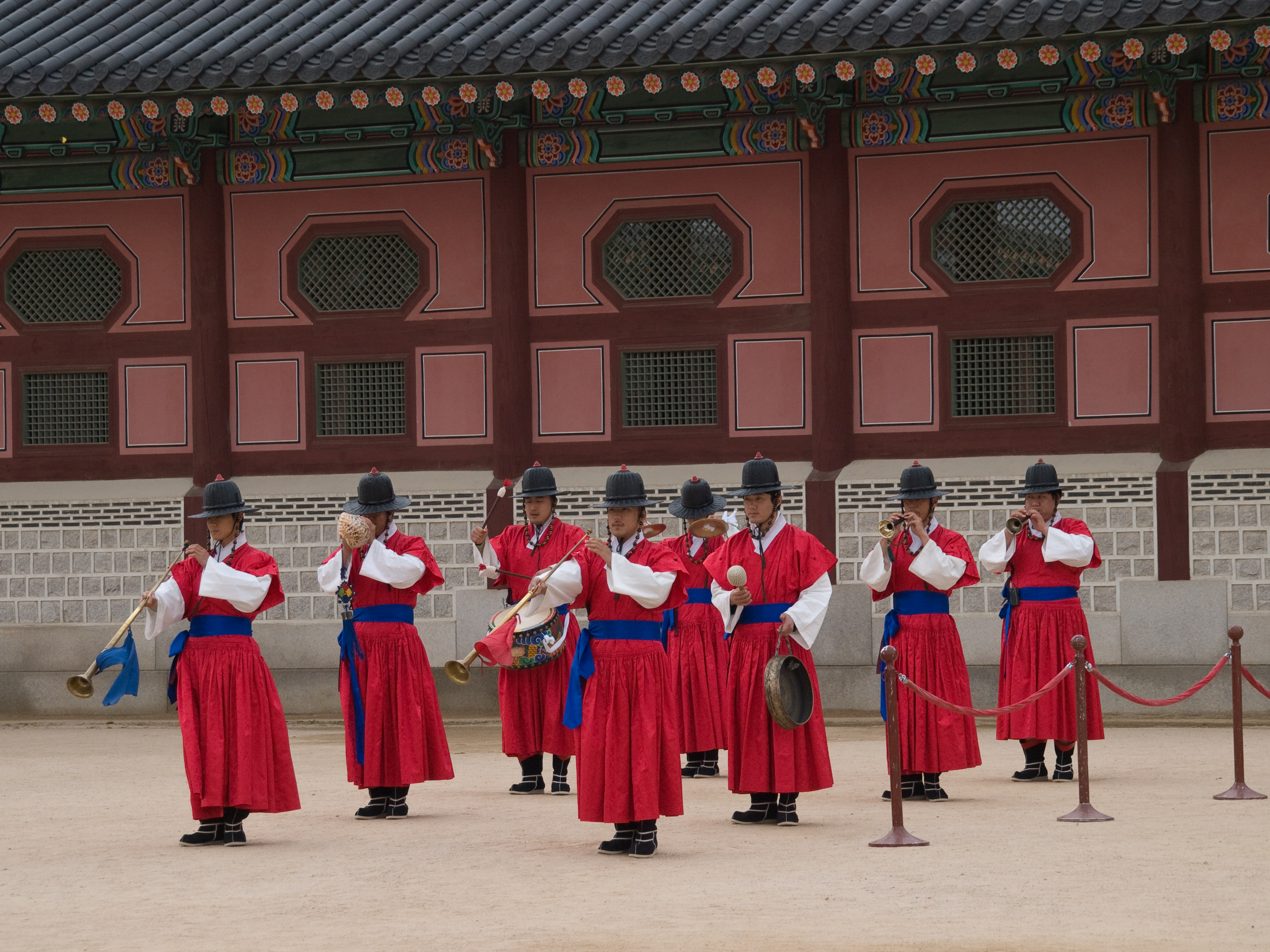
- Daechwita musicians performing for the changing of the guard at Gyeongbokgung in Seoul.

Korean name
- Hangul: 대취타
- Hanja: 大吹打
- Revised Romanization: Daechwita
- McCune–Reischauer: Taech'wit'a

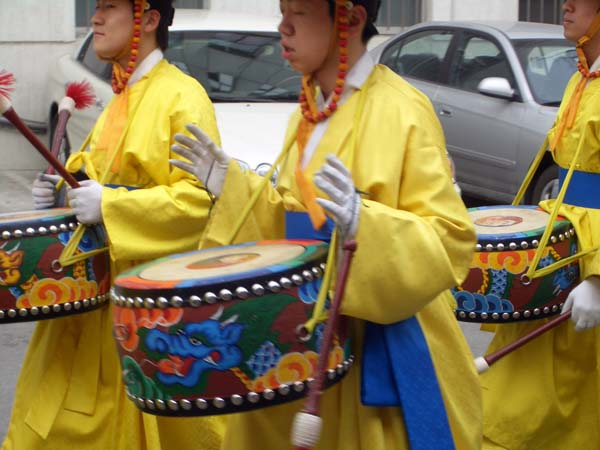
Daechwita musicians playing yonggo (dragon drums) in a Seoul street parade.

Daechwita (Korean: 대취타; lit. Great Blowing and Hitting) is a genre of Korean traditional music consisting of military music played by wind and percussion instruments, generally performed while marching or as a static performance.

== Instrumentation ==
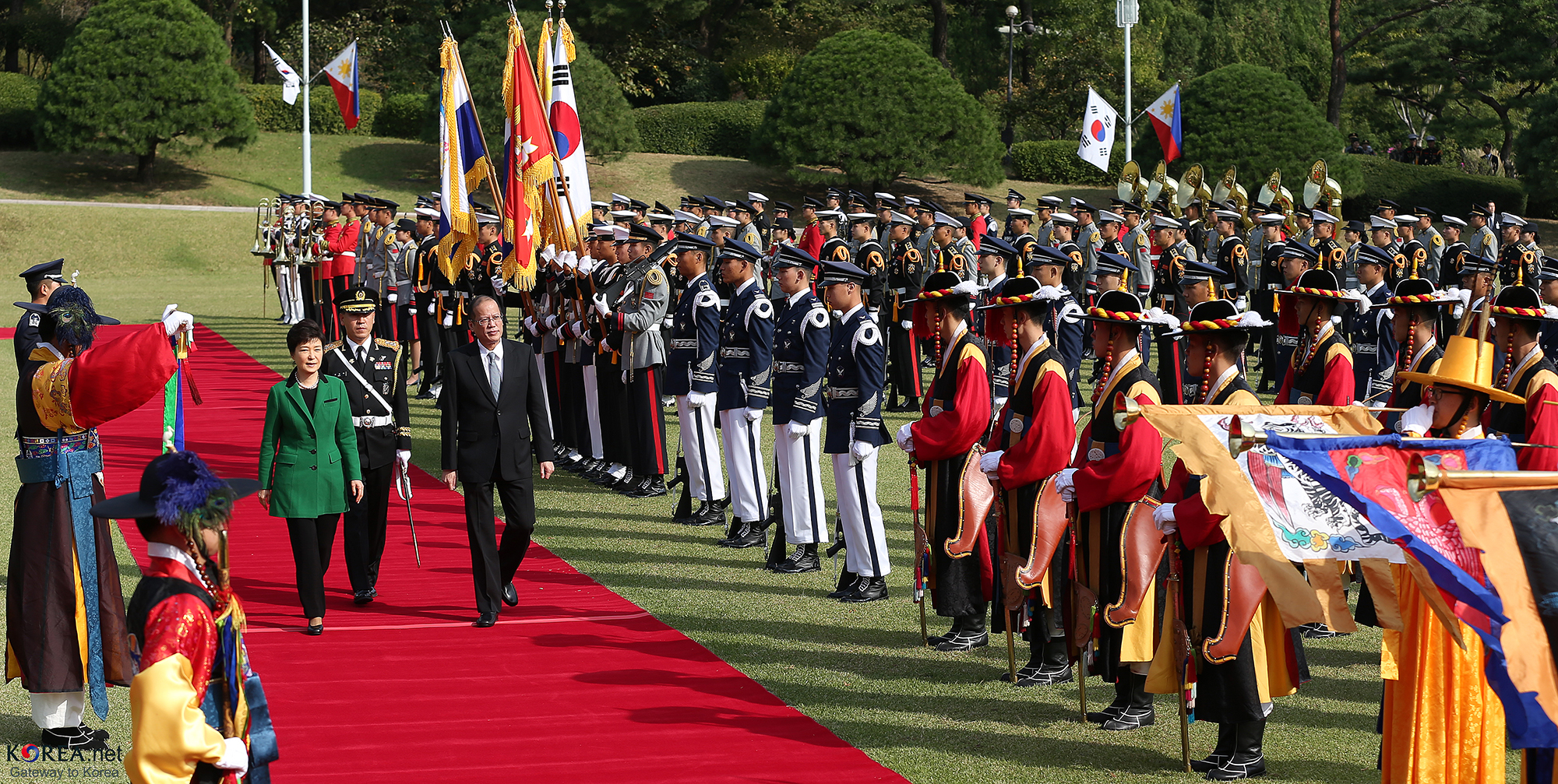
Traditional Band and Traditional Honor Guards in the official welcome ceremony for Philippines President Benigno Aquino III at Cheong Wa Dae (2013)

Instruments used include nabal (brass horn), nagak (seashell horn), and taepyeongso (shawm), with jing (gong), jabara (cymbals), Ulla (xylophone), and yonggo (용고; 龍鼓; drum painted with dragon designs and played with hard mallets).

This style of Korean military music is often used in the reenactment of the Guard Changing Ceremony at Seoul's Gyeongbokgung Palace, as well as in Deoksugung Palace. Special daechwitas today is under the service of the Ministry of National Defense Traditional Band and the Traditional Guard Unit, 3rd Infantry Division, Republic of Korea Army, and are the only ones that also has the Ulla (small tuned gongs), Pungmul-buk and Galgo in its instrumentation.

This is the same case for traditional Korean bands outside the homeland, which also have a pungmul marching percussion battery (with kkwaenggwari, janggu and pungmul-buk drums) at the rear with distinguishing uniforms between the two ensembles. Few modern bands based in schools sport bass drums together with the kwaennggwari, galgo and janggu, as well as the daegeum flute, as part of their instrumentation.

Uniforms in the band are in royal gold or red and white, as these were connected in the Imperial period to the Imperial family and the armed forces of the Korean Empire. Most bandsmen in ensembles today wear the royal gold full dress.

The Bandmaster of the ensemble, called a deungchae, carries a long baton to direct the ensemble during performances.

Today, the Ministry of National Defense Traditional Band and Traditional Honor Guards participate in official welcome ceremonies for foreign heads of state and in other state or special events, with the band playing daechwita and the honor guards carrying out ceremonial duties.

== Chwita ==
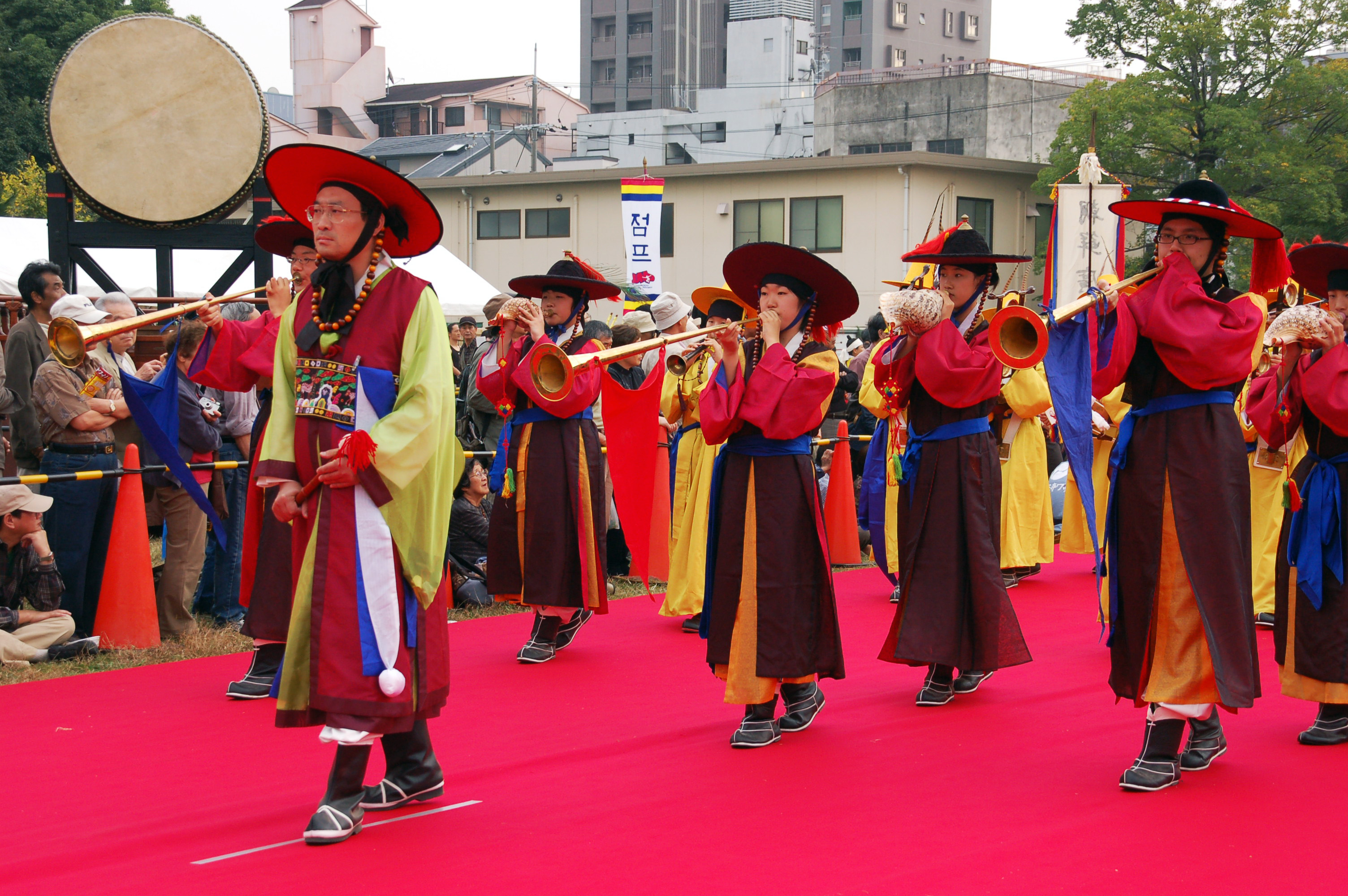
Daechwita performance in Osaka, Japan

Chwita is the name of the military music played in military processions, military parades and on such occasions as when the gates to military headquarters were opened or closed.

== Popular culture ==
South Korean rapper Agust D, also known as Suga from BTS, released a rap song called 'Daechwita (대취타)' on his second solo mixtape D-2 (2020). The song is heavily inspired by and samples daechwita performed by the National Gugak Center.
