= Ganekogorta =

Mountain in the Basque Country, Spain

- Belaute
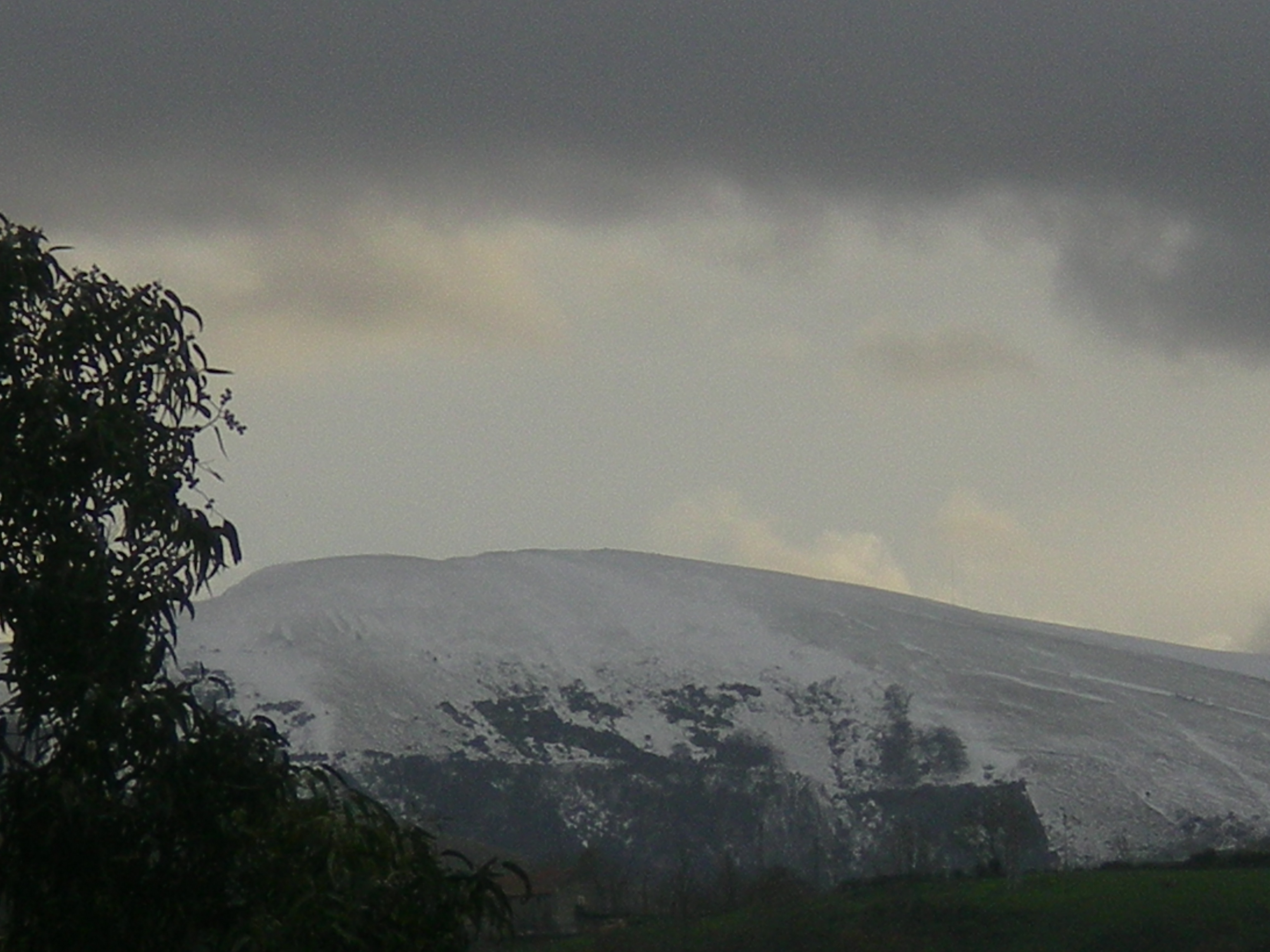
- Ganekogorta

Highest point
- Elevation: 999 m (3,278 ft)
- Prominence: 725
- Coordinates: 43°12′12″N 2°58′41″W

Naming
- Language of name: Basque

Geography
- Location: Álava and Biscay, Basque Country, Spain

Climbing
- Easiest route: Hike

Ganekogorta or Belaute is a mountain in the border of the provinces of Biscay and Álava in the Basque Country, Spain. It is located roughly halfway between Bilbao and Llodio. It is the main peak of a massif that comprises some smaller mountains like Pagasarri, Ganeta, Pastorekorta, Arnotegi and Arraiz. The northern slopes of the massif reach the city of Bilbao.
