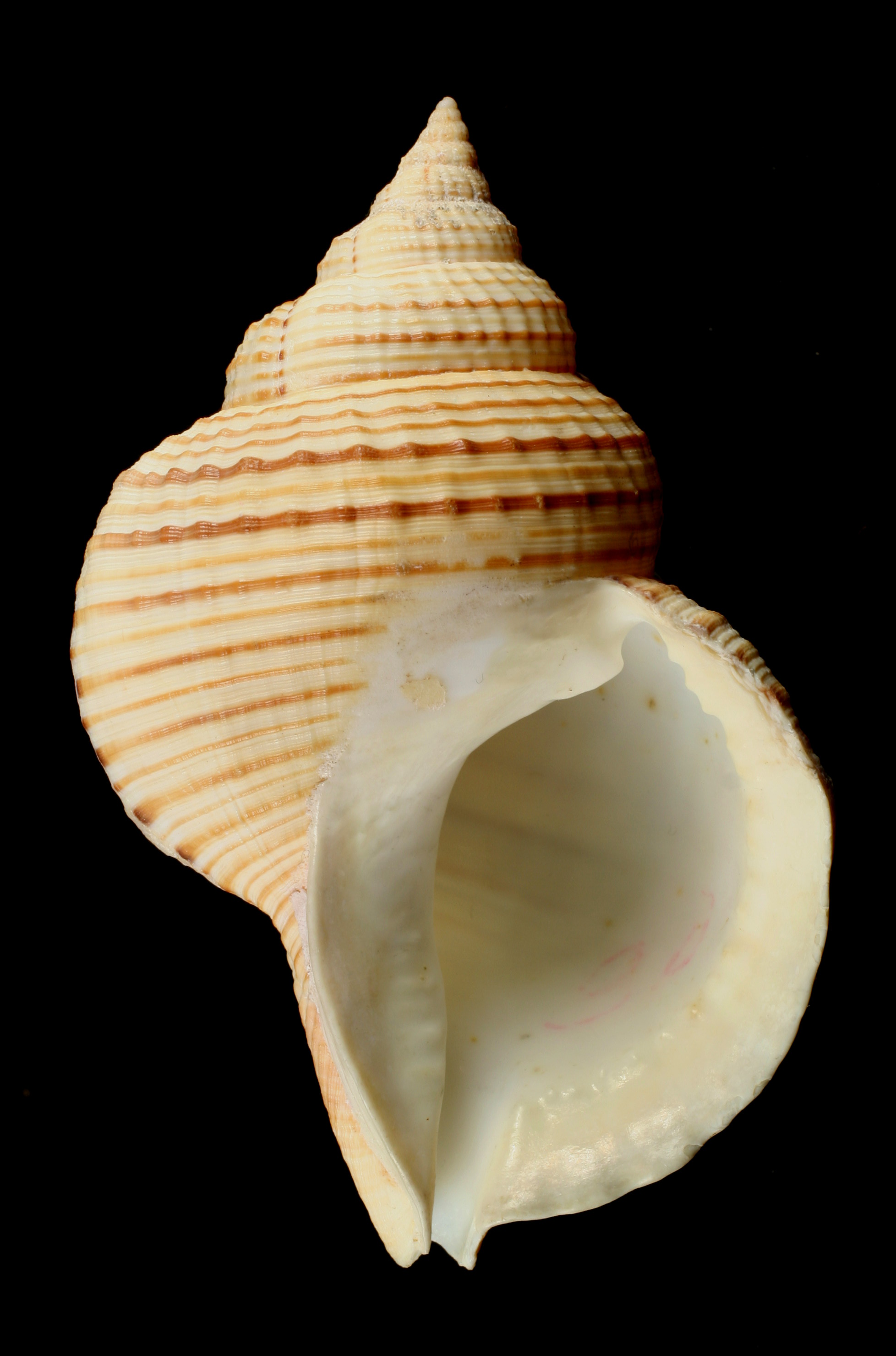
- Argobuccinum pustulosum shell

Scientific classification
- Kingdom: Animalia
- Phylum: Mollusca
- Class: Gastropoda
- Subclass: Caenogastropoda
- Order: Littorinimorpha
- Family: Cymatiidae
- Genus: Argobuccinum; Herrmannsen, 1846

Synonyms
- Gondwanula Finlay, 1926; Mediargo Terry, 1968

= Argobuccinum =

Genus of gastropods

Argobuccinum is a genus of predatory sea snails, marine gastropod mollusks in the family Cymatiidae.

== Species ==
Species within the genus Argobuccinum include:

- Argobuccinum pustulosum (Lightfoot, 1786) - synonym: Argobuccinum tumidum (Dunker, 1862)

Species brought into synonymy

- Argobuccinum magellanicus (Röding, 1798): synonym of Fusitriton magellanicus (Röding, 1798)
- Argobuccinum murrayi E. A. Smith, 1891: synonym of Fusitriton murrayi (E. A. Smith, 1891)
- Argobuccinum proditor (Frauenfeld, 1865): synonym of Argobuccinum pustulosum (Lightfoot, 1786)
- Argobuccinum retiolus Hedley, 1914: synonym of Fusitriton retiolus (Hedley, 1914)
- Argobuccinum rude (Broderip, 1833): synonym of Priene scabrum (King, 1832)
- Argobuccinum scabrum (King, 1832): synonym of Priene scabrum (King, 1832)
- Argobuccinum ranelliforme (King, 1832): synonym of Argobuccinum pustulosum (Lightfoot, 1786)
- Argobuccinum tristanense Dell, 1963: synonym of Argobuccinum proditor (Frauenfeld, 1865)
