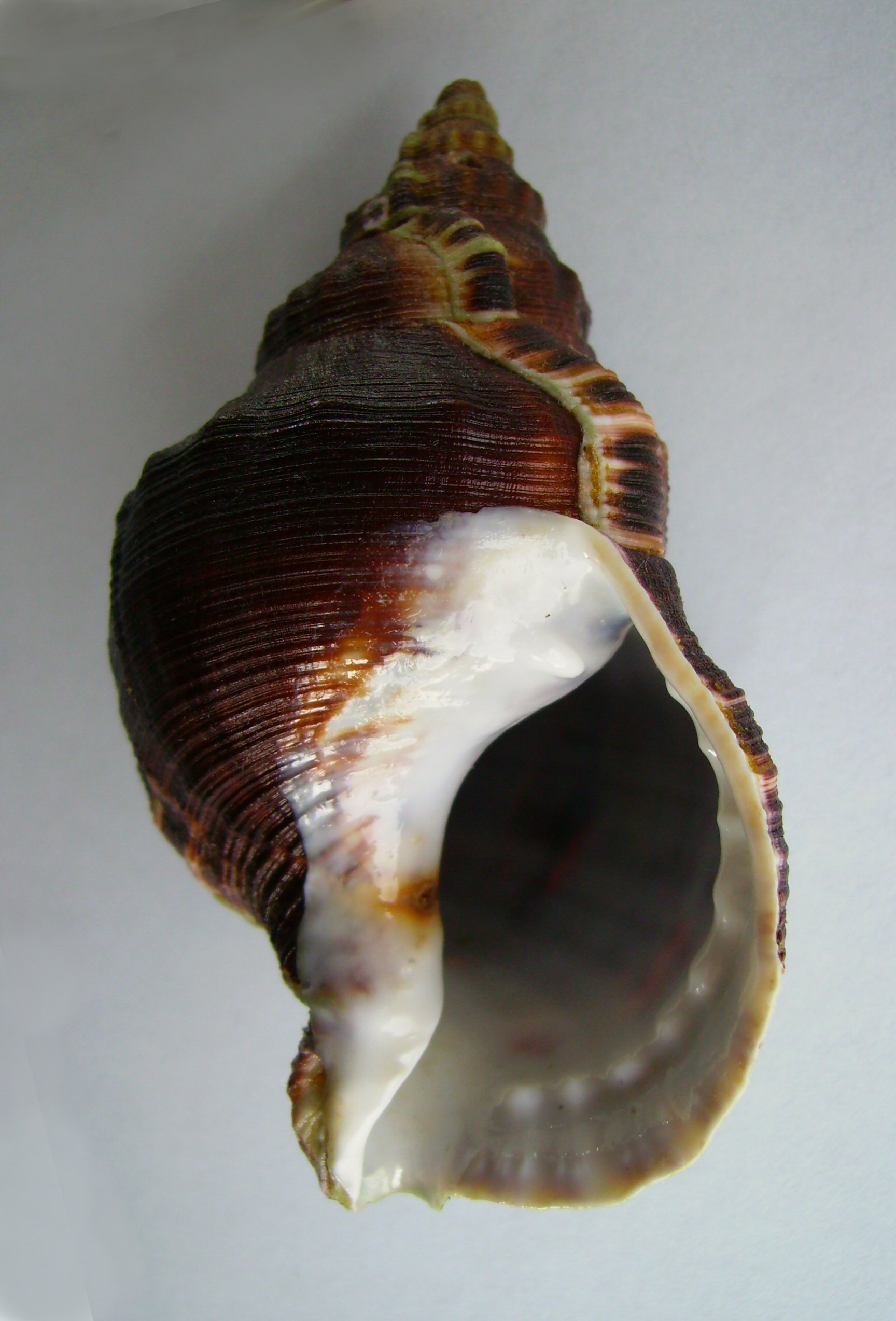
- Apertural view of a shell of Ranella australasia

Scientific classification
- Kingdom: Animalia
- Phylum: Mollusca
- Class: Gastropoda
- Subclass: Caenogastropoda
- Order: Littorinimorpha
- Family: Ranellidae
- Genus: Ranella
- Species: R. australasia

Binomial name
- Ranella australasia (Perry, 1811)

Synonyms
- Biplex australasia Perry, 1811; Mayena australasia australasia (Perry, 1811); Mayena australasia benthicola Iredale, 1929; Mayena australasia blacki Powell, 1954; Mayena australasia vossi Powell, 1952; Mayena euclia Cotton, 1945; Mayena kurtzei Cotton, 1957; Mayena zelandica Finlay, 1926; Ranella leucostoma Lamarck, 1822

= Ranella australasia =

Species of gastropod

Ranella australasia is a species of large predatory sea snail, a marine gastropod mollusk in the family Ranellidae, the triton snails, triton shells or tritons. This species is native to Australia and New Zealand where it is widespread, as well as Norfolk Island, Lord Howe Island, and the Kermadec Islands.

A closely related species, Ranella gemmifera, formerly known as Ranella australasia gemmifera, is native to South Africa.

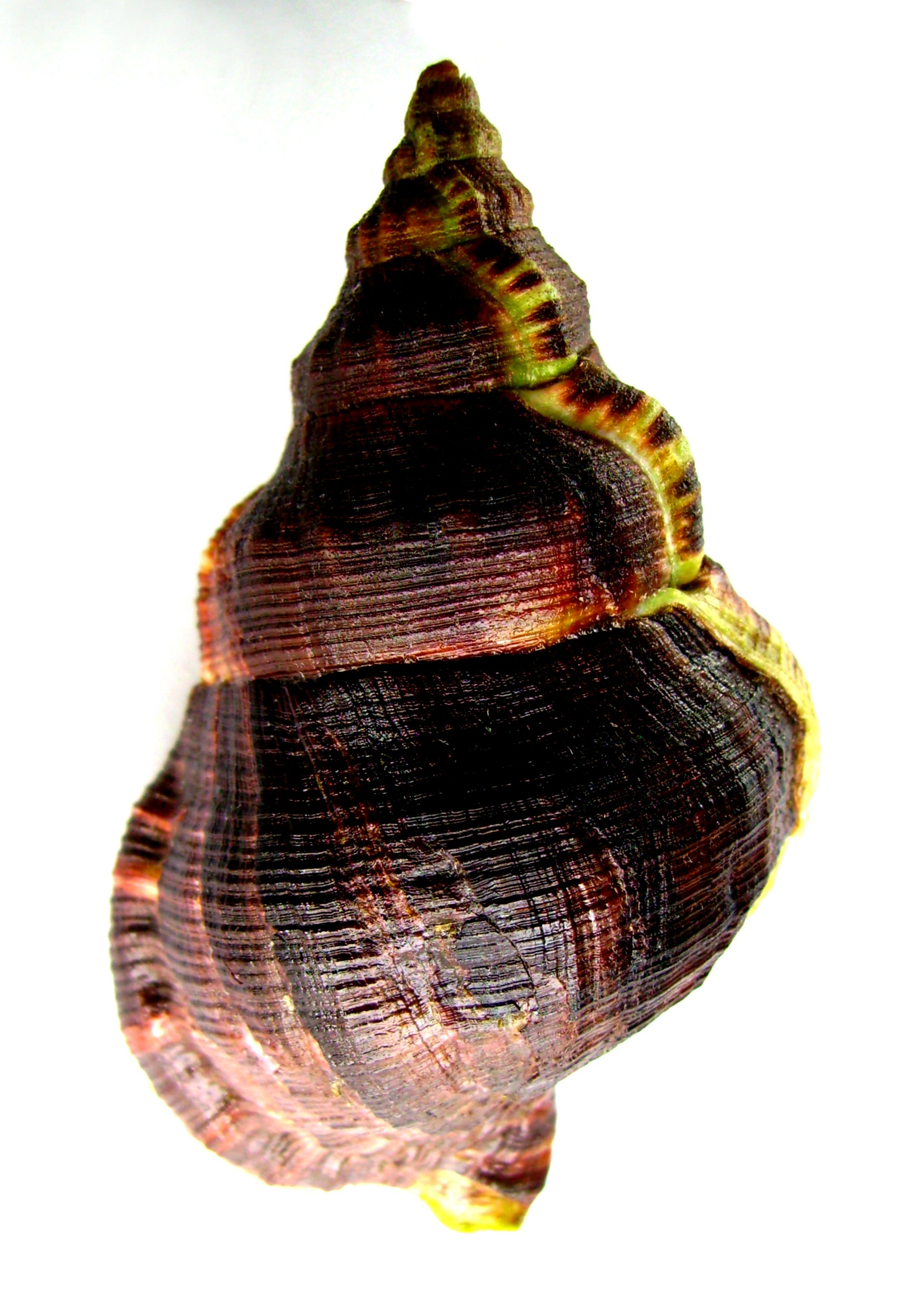
Abapertural view of a shell of Ranella australasia
