= Columella (gastropod) =

Gastropod anatomy

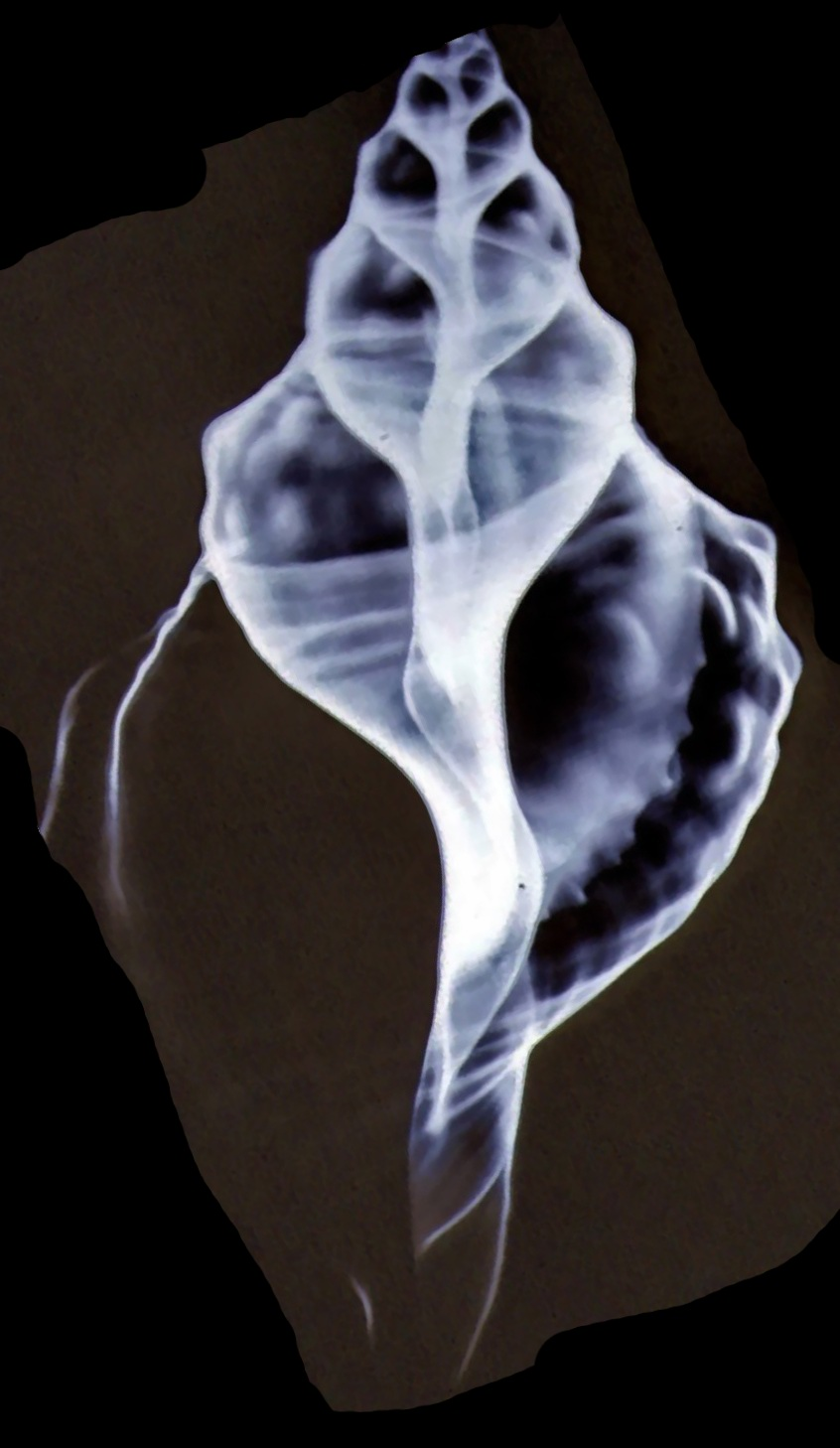
An X-ray image of a shell of a marine Triton snail (Charonia), showing the slightly sinuous line of the central columella, reaching from the top of the image (the apex of the shell) to the bottom (the siphonal canal)

The columella (meaning "little column") or (in older texts) pillar is a central anatomical feature of a coiled snail shell, a gastropod shell. The columella is often only clearly visible as a structure when the shell is broken, sliced in half vertically, or viewed as an X-ray image.

The term pillar is often used to describe the visible, lower extremity of the columella, specifically where it forms the base of the aperture and transitions into the siphonal canal.

The columella runs from the apex of the shell to the midpoint of the undersurface of the shell, or the tip of the siphonal canal in those shells which have a siphonal canal. If a snail shell is visualized as a cone of shelly material which is wrapped around a central axis, then the columella more or less coincides spatially with the central axis of the shell. In imperforate species, the columella is a solid pillar of calcite when the center of coiling is filled in by shell material. In the case of shells that have an umbilicus, the columella is a hollow tubular structure, because the center of coiling (the umbilicus) remains an open space. The columella then forms the wall of this tube.

The columella of some groups of gastropod shells can have a number of plications or folds (the columellar fold, plaits or plicae), which are usually visible when looking to the inner lip into the aperture of the shell. These folds can be wide or narrow, prominent or subtle. These features of the columella are often useful in identifying the family, genus, or species of the gastropod.

The surface of the columella is called the columellar wall. The columellar callus is a smooth, calcareous thickening, secreted by the mantle, extending over the columellar area. The columellar lip, the visible part of the columella, is the lower part of the inner lip and is situated near the axis of coiling. A columellar tooth is a raised projection on the inner lip of a columella in the direction of the aperture.

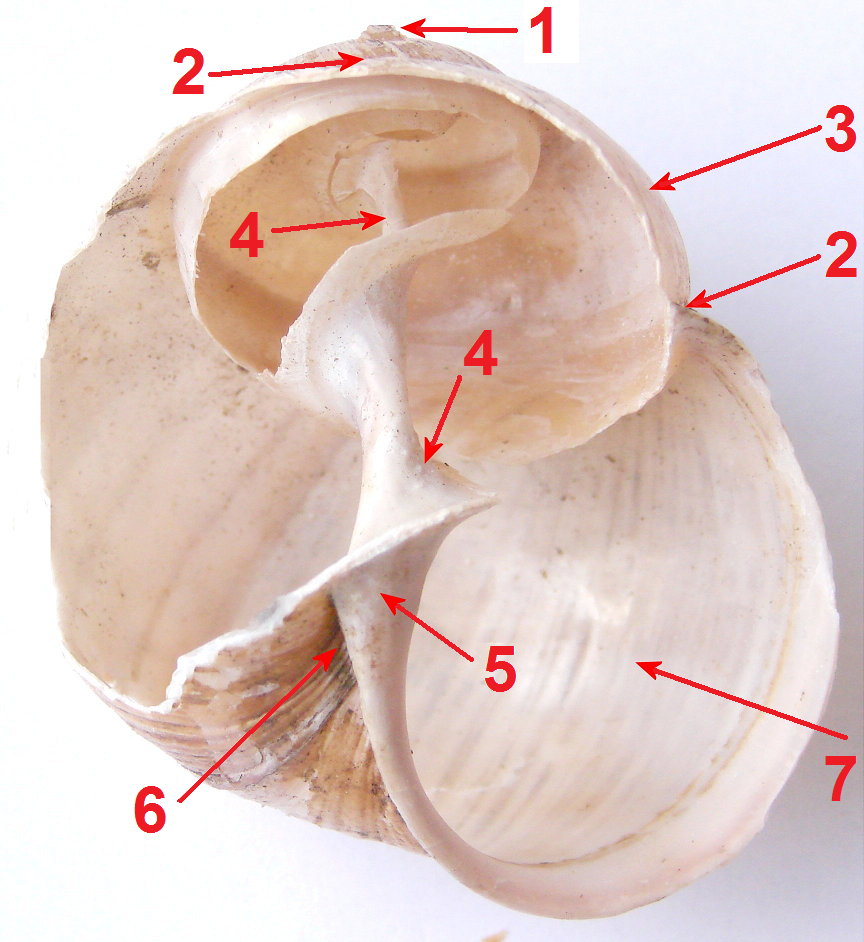
Shell of Helix pomatia with a part of shell removed; (4) the columella

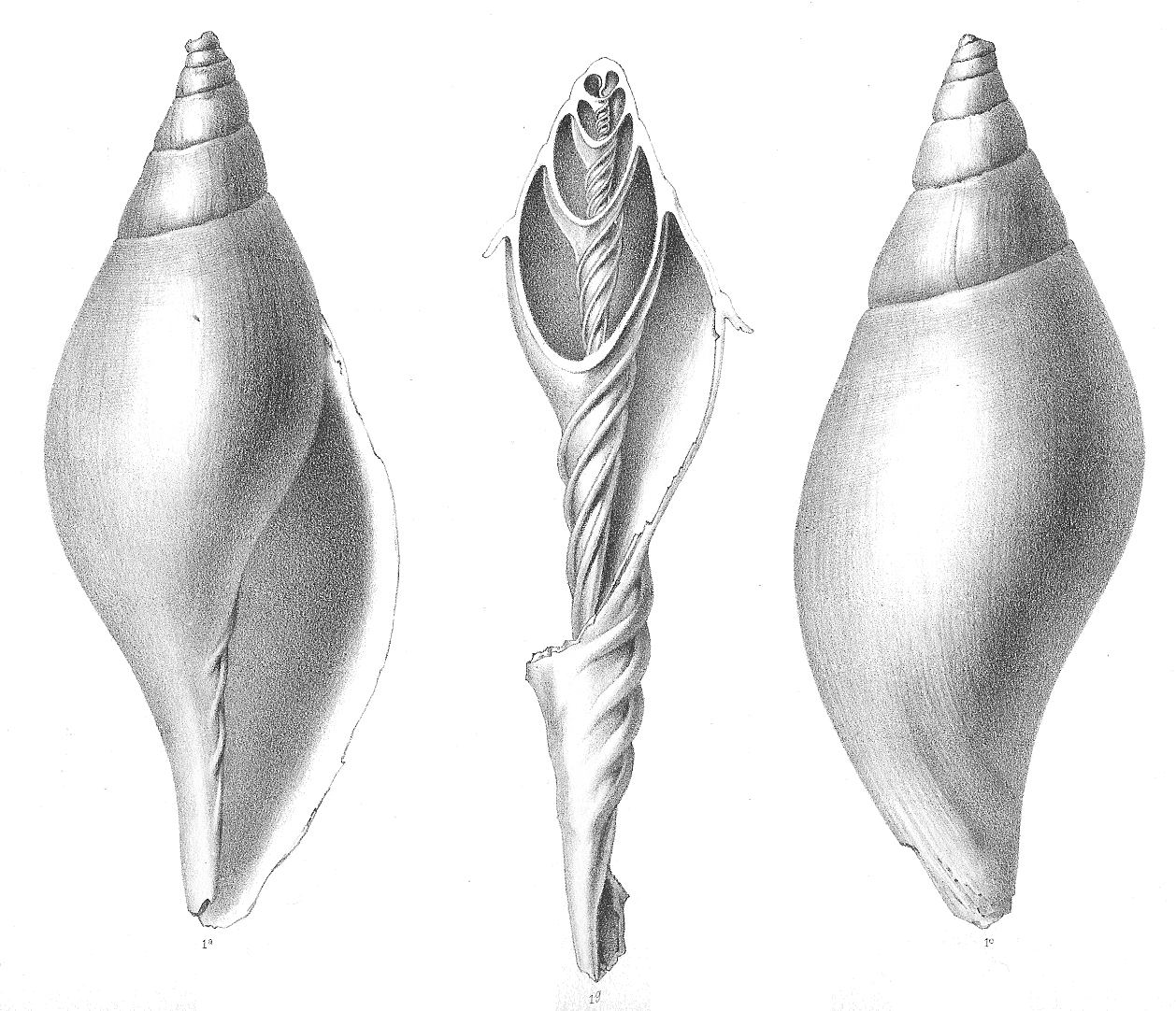
Two views of a shell of Scaphella lamberti, and in the center, a cut-down shell showing the folds on the columella

== Columellar muscles ==
The soft parts of the body of the gastropod are held in place in the shell by the columellar muscles. These muscles are attached strongly to the columella itself not just far up in the apex of the shell but also by a long and narrow attachment over the length of a full whorl along the columella. The columellar muscle passes underneath the mantle, greatly thickening the body wall, through the foot and is attached at its other end to inner face of the operculum (if present).

The columellar muscles are contracted when the animal needs to withdraw the foot, head, and other soft parts into the shell for protection from drying out, and from predators. During these contractions the operculum and shell are approximated, and the animal is withdrawn within the latter. The columellar muscles are equally used to bring the soft body out of the shell. During protraction and retraction, the muscle twists, shortens or elongates.

In very large gastropods such as the queen conch (Aliger gigas) once the columellar muscles are cut with a knife, the soft parts of the animal fall out of the shell easily. Conch fishermen in the Caribbean Sea break a small hole in the spire of the shell, cut the columellar muscles, and harvest the live meat of this species. Often the fishermen dump the empty shell back into the sea again.
