= Olearius =

Olearius is a surname. Notable people with the surname include:

- Adam Olearius (1603–1671), German scholar, mathematician, geographer and librarian
- Johann Olearius (1611–1684), German theologian and hymnwriter

== See also ==
- Omphalotus olearius, commonly known as the Jack o'Lantern mushroom
- Ranella olearius, a species of large sea snail
- Olearia, a genus of flowering plants belonging to the family Asteraceae
