= Obscuranella papyrodes =

Scientific classification
- Kingdom: Animalia
- Phylum: Mollusca
- Class: Gastropoda
- Subclass: Caenogastropoda
- Order: Littorinimorpha
- Family: Ranellidae
- Genus: Obscuranella
- Species: O. papyrodes

Binomial name
- Obscuranella papyrodes Kantor & Harasewych, 2000

Species of gastropod

Obscuranella papyrodes is a species of predatory sea snail, a marine gastropod mollusk in the family Ranellidae, the triton snails, triton shells or tritons.
