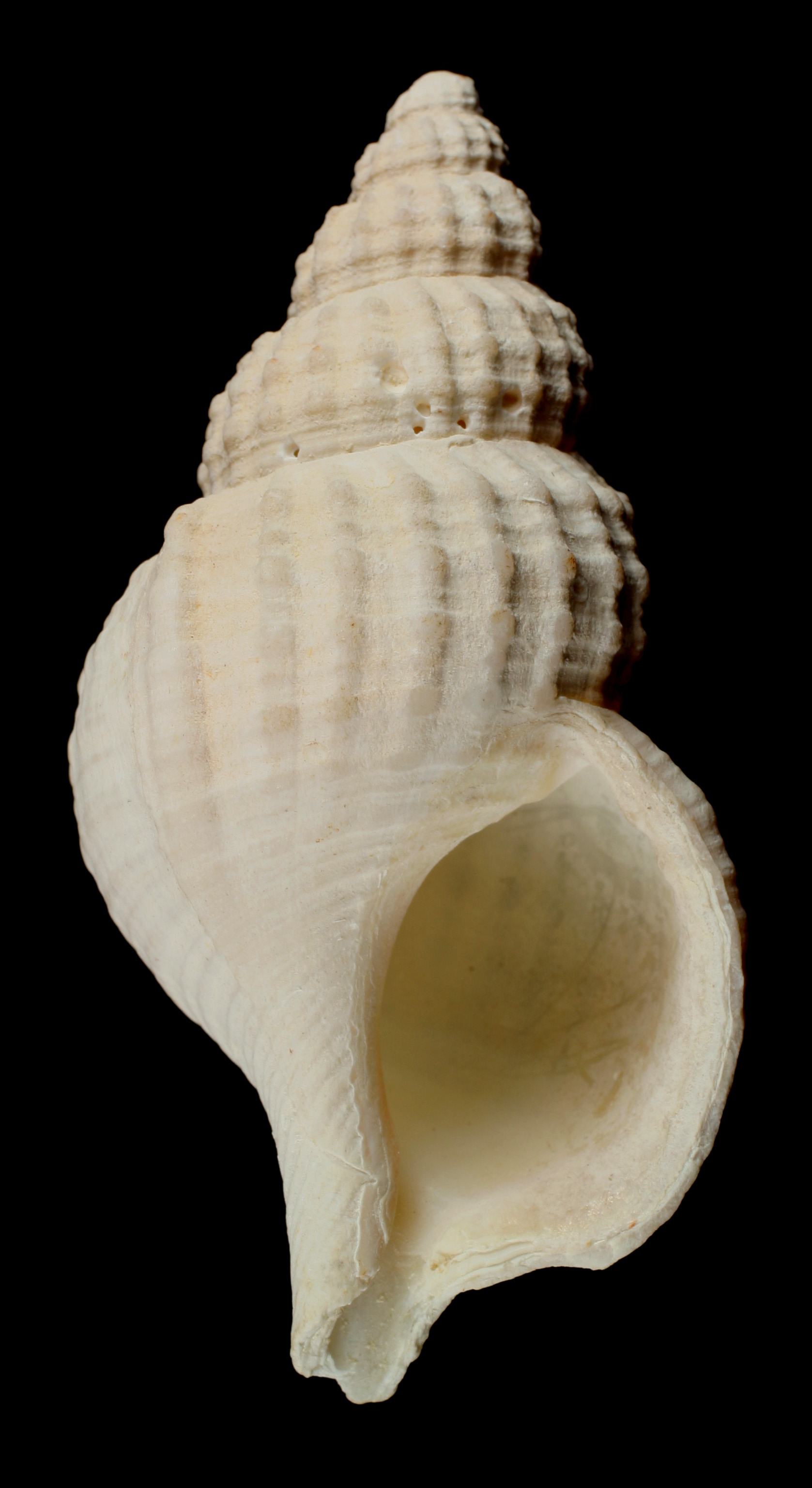
- Fusitriton murrayi

Scientific classification
- Kingdom: Animalia
- Phylum: Mollusca
- Class: Gastropoda
- Subclass: Caenogastropoda
- Order: Littorinimorpha
- Family: Cymatiidae
- Genus: Fusitriton; Cossmann, 1903

Synonyms
- Argobuccinum (Fusitriton) Cossmann, 1903; Cryotritonium Martens, 1904

= Fusitriton =

Genus of gastropods

Fusitriton is a genus of large predatory sea snails marine gastropod molluscs in the family Cymatiidae.

== Species ==
Species within the genus Fusitroton include:

- Fusitriton brasiliensis Cossignani & Cossignani, 2003
- Fusitriton galea Kuroda & Habe, 1961
- Fusitriton glassi Swinnen, 2019
- Fusitriton laudandus Finlay, 1926
- Fusitriton magellanicus (Röding, 1798)
- Fusitriton oregonensis (Redfield, 1846)
- Fusitriton retiolus (Hedley, 1914)
- Fusitriton takedai Habe, 1979

Species brought into synonymy

- Fusitriton algoensis Tomlin, 1947: synonym of Fusitriton murrayi (E. A. Smith, 1891): synonym of Fusitriton magellanicus (Röding, 1798) (synonym)
- Fusitriton antarcticus Powell, 1958: synonym of Antarctoneptunea aurora (Hedley, 1916)
- Fusitriton aurora Hedley, 1916: synonym of Antarctoneptunea aurora (Hedley, 1916) (original combination)
- Fusitriton futuristi Mestayer, 1927: synonym of Fusitriton laudandus Finlay, 1926 (synonym)
- Fusitriton midwayensis Habe & Okutani, 1968: synonym of Sassia midwayensis (Habe & Okutani, 1968) (original combination)
- Fusitriton murrayi (E. A. Smith, 1891): synonym of Fusitriton magellanicus (Röding, 1798)
