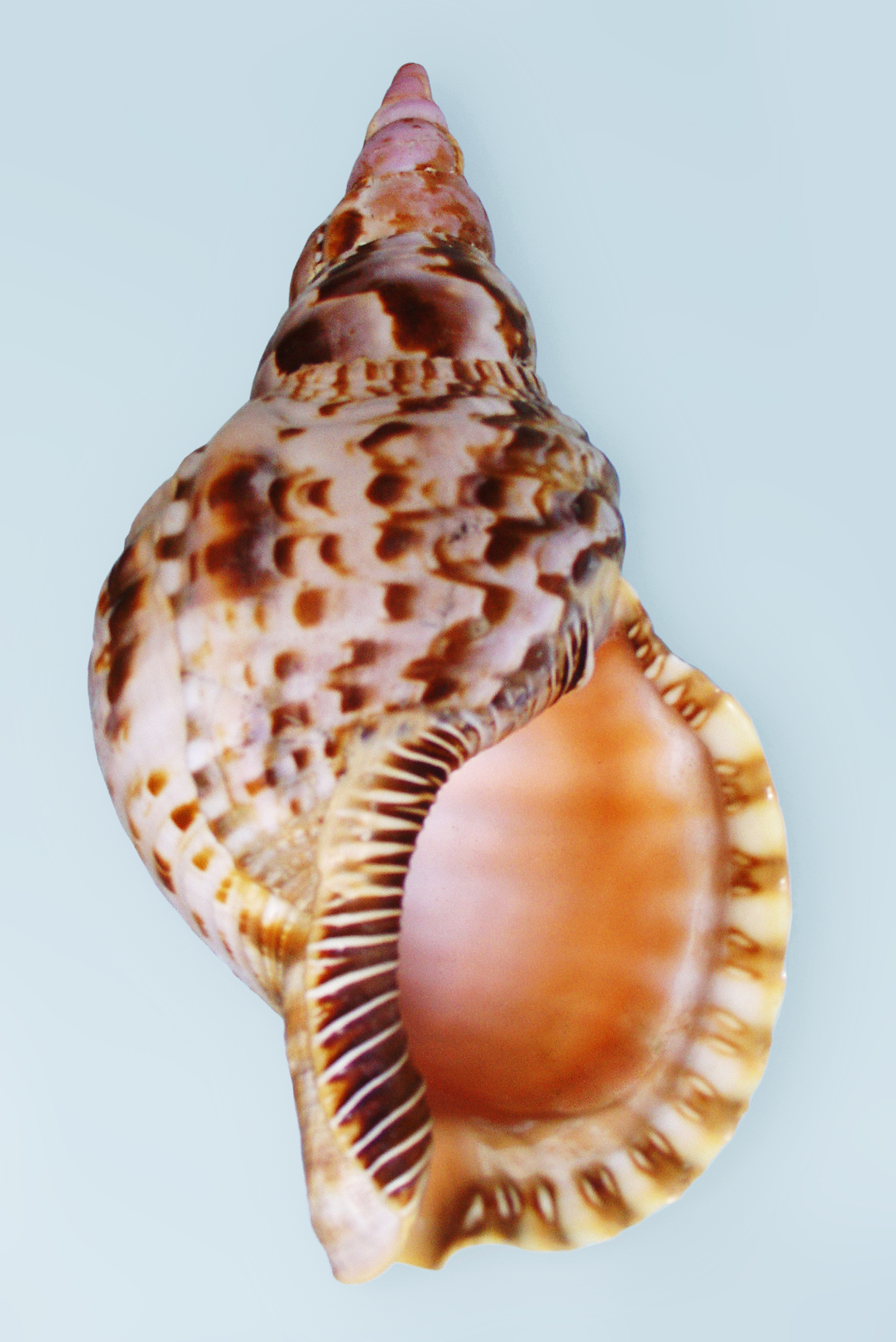
- Apertural view of a shell of Charonia variegata

Scientific classification
- Kingdom: Animalia
- Phylum: Mollusca
- Class: Gastropoda
- Subclass: Caenogastropoda
- Order: Littorinimorpha
- Superfamily: Tonnoidea
- Family: Charoniidae; Powell, 1933
- Genus: Charonia; Gistel, 1847

Type species
- Murex tritonis Linnaeus, 1758

Extant species
- Charonia lampas; Charonia marylenae; Charonia seguenzae; Charonia thiagni; Charonia tritonis; Charonia variegata

Synonyms
- Eutriton (incorrect subsequent spelling of Eutritonium); Eutritonium Cossmann, 1904 (objective synonym of Charonia); Triton Montfort, 1810 (Invalid: junior homonym of Triton Linnaeus, 1758); Triton (Buccinatorium) Mörch, 1877; † Triton (Semiranella) de Gregorio, 1880; Tritonium Röding, 1798 (invalid: junior homonym of Tritonium O.F. Müller, 1776)

= Charonia =

Charonia Temporal range: Cretaceous - present

Genus of gastropods

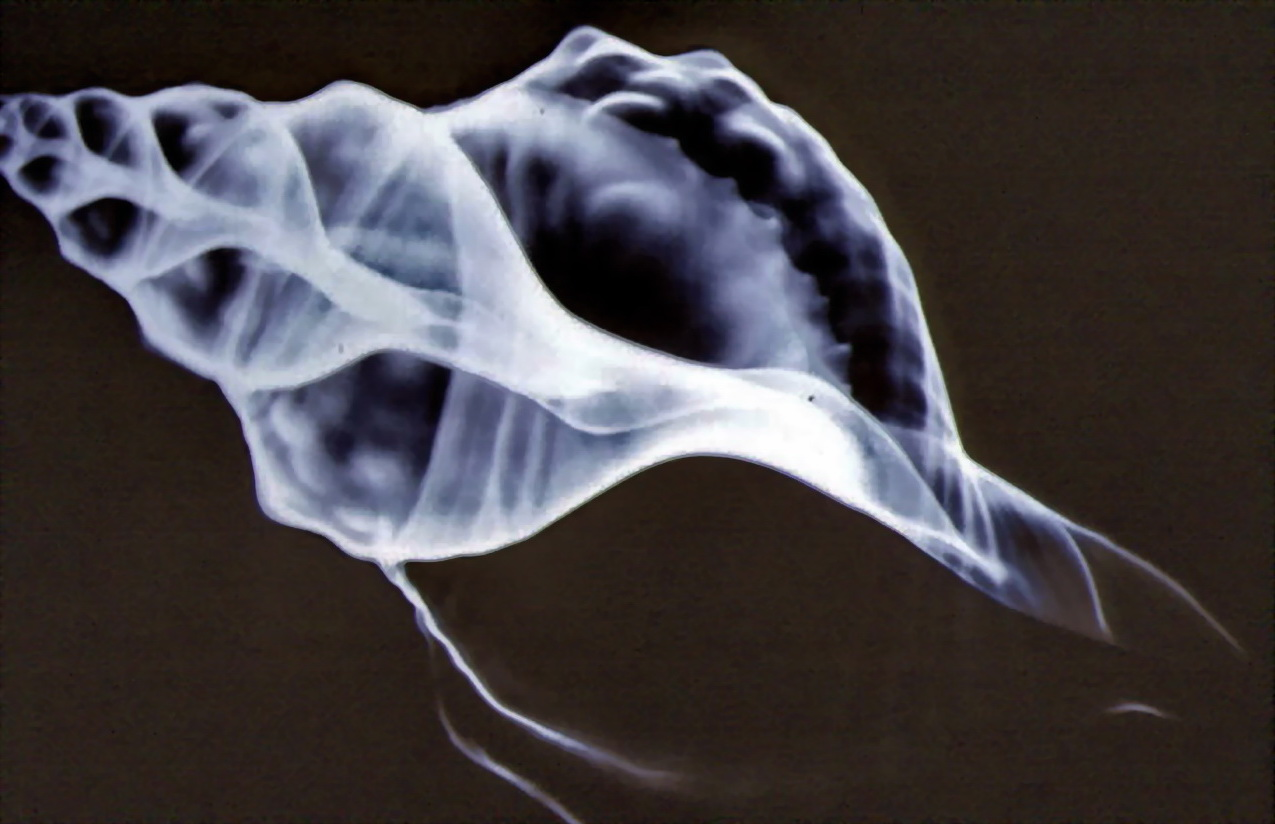
X-ray image of the shell of Charonia lampas

Charonia is a genus of very large sea snail, commonly known as Triton's trumpet or Triton snail. They are marine gastropod mollusks in the monotypic family Charoniidae. They are one of the few natural predators of the crown-of-thorns starfish.

== Etymology ==
The common name "Triton's trumpet" is derived from the Greek god Triton, who was the son of Poseidon, god of the sea. The god Triton is often portrayed blowing a large seashell horn similar to this species.

== Fossil records ==
This genus is known in the fossil records as far back as the Cretaceous period. Fossils are found in the marine strata throughout the world.

== Description ==
Species within the genus Charonia have large fusiform shells, usually whiteish with brown or yellow markings.

The shell of the giant triton Charonia tritonis (Linnaeus, 1758), which lives in the Indo-Pacific, can grow to over 0.5 m (20 in) in length.

One slightly smaller (shell size 100–385 mm (3.9–15.2 in) but still very large species, Charonia variegata (Lamarck, 1816), lives in the western Atlantic, from North Carolina to Brazil.

== Distribution ==
Charonia species inhabit temperate and tropical waters worldwide.

== Life habits ==
Unlike pulmonate and opisthobranch gastropods, tritons are not hermaphrodites; they have separate sexes and undergo sexual reproduction with internal fertilization. The female deposits white capsules in clusters, each of which contains many developing larvae. The larvae emerge free-swimming and enter the plankton, where they drift in open water for up to three months.

== Feeding behavior ==
Adult tritons are active predators and feed on other molluscs and starfish. The giant triton has gained fame for its ability to capture and eat crown-of-thorns starfish, a large species (up to 1 m in diameter) covered in venomous spikes an inch long. The crown-of-thorns starfish has few other natural predators and are capable of destroying large sections of coral reef.

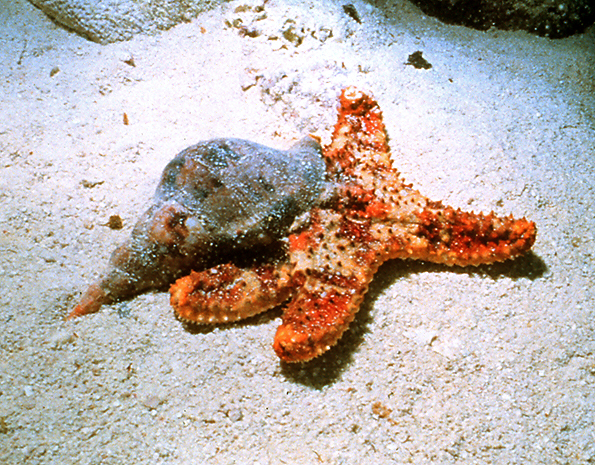
The struggle between a starfish and an Atlantic triton can last up to an hour before the seastar is subdued by the snail's paralyzing saliva.

Tritons can be observed to turn and give chase when the scent of prey is detected. Some starfish (including the crown-of-thorns starfish) appear to be able to detect the approach of the mollusc by means that are not clearly understood, and they attempt flight before any physical contact has taken place. Tritons, however, are faster than starfish, and only large starfish have a reasonable hope of escape, and then only by abandoning whichever limb the snail seizes first.

The triton grips its prey with its muscular foot and uses its toothy radula (a serrated, scraping organ found in gastropods) to saw through the starfish's armoured skin. Once it has penetrated, a paralyzing saliva subdues the prey and the snail feeds at leisure, often beginning with the softest parts such as the gonads and gut.

Tritons ingest smaller prey animals whole without troubling to paralyse them, and spit out any poisonous spines, shells, or other unwanted parts later.

== Species and subspecies ==
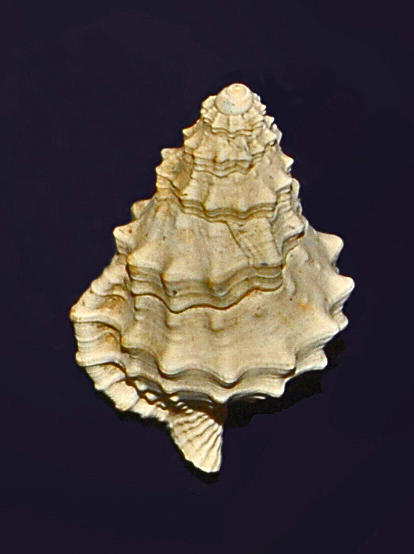
Fossil shell of Charonia appenninica from Pliocene of Italy

Species within the genus Charonia include:

- Charonia guichemerrei Lozouet, 1998 †
- Charonia lampas (Linnaeus, 1758)
- Charonia marylenae Petuch & Berschauer, 2020
- Charonia seguenzae (Aradas & Benoit, 1872)
- Charonia tritonis (Linnaeus, 1758)
- Charonia variegata (Lamarck, 1816) - Caribbean Triton's trumpet
- Charonia veterior Lozouet, 1999 †

Synonymized species

- Charonia capax Finlay, 1926: synonym of Charonia lampas (Linnaeus, 1758)
- Charonia digitalis (Reeve, 1844): synonym of Maculotriton serriale (Deshayes, 1834)
- Charonia eucla Hedley, 1914 : synonym of Charonia lampas (Linnaeus, 1758)
- Charonia eucla instructa Iredale, 1929: synonym of Charonia lampas (Linnaeus, 1758)
- Charonia grandimaculatus Reeve: synonym of Lotoria grandimaculata (Reeve, 1844)
- Charonia maculosum Gmelin: synonym of Colubraria maculosa (Gmelin, 1791) (new combination)
- Charonia mirabilis Parenzan, 1970: synonym of Charonia lampas (Linnaeus, 1758)
- Charonia nodifera(Lamarck, 1822): synonym of Charonia lampas (Linnaeus, 1758)
- Charonia poecilostoma Smith, 1915: synonym of Ranella gemmifera (Euthyme, 1889)
- Charonia powelli Cotton, 1957 : synonym of Charonia lampas (Linnaeus, 1758)
- Charonia rubicunda (Perry, 1811): synonym of Charonia lampas (Linnaeus, 1758)
- Charonia sauliae (Reeve, 1844): synonym of Charonia lampas (Linnaeus, 1758)
- Charonia seguenzae (Aradas & Benoit, 1872): synonym of Charonia variegata (Lamarck, 1816)
- Charonia variegatus Reeve: synonym of Charonia variegata (Lamarck, 1816)
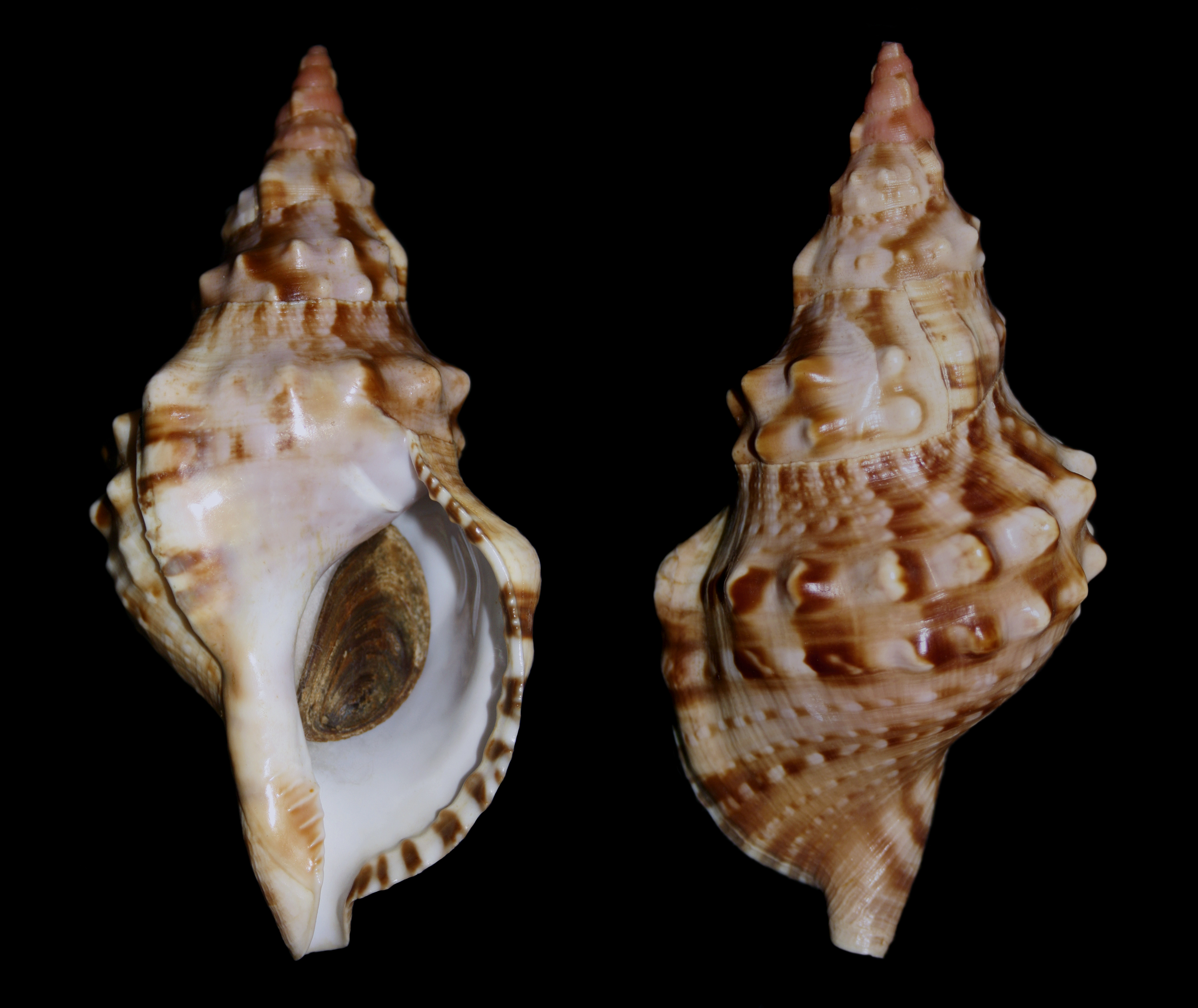
Charonia lampas

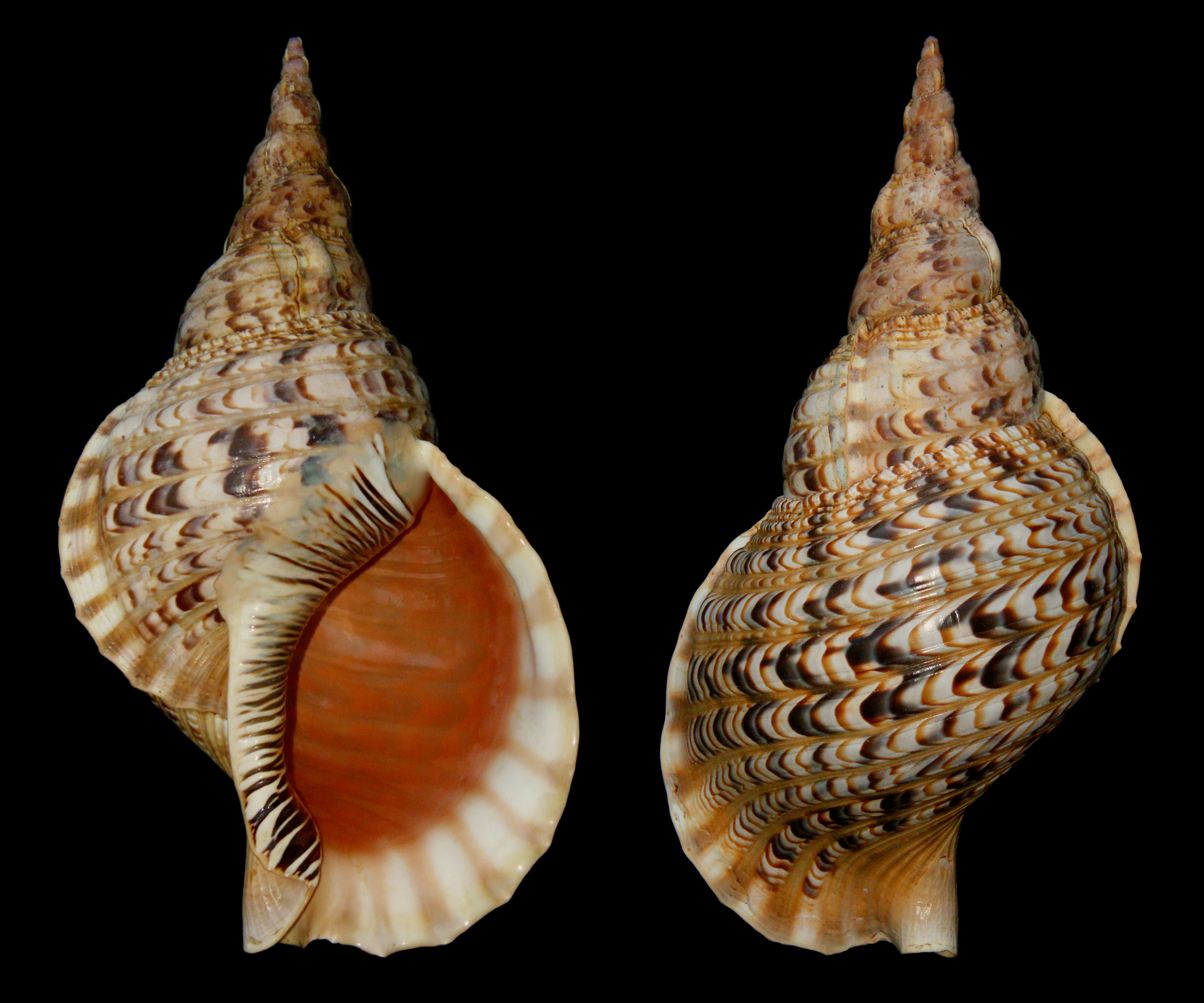
Charonia tritonis

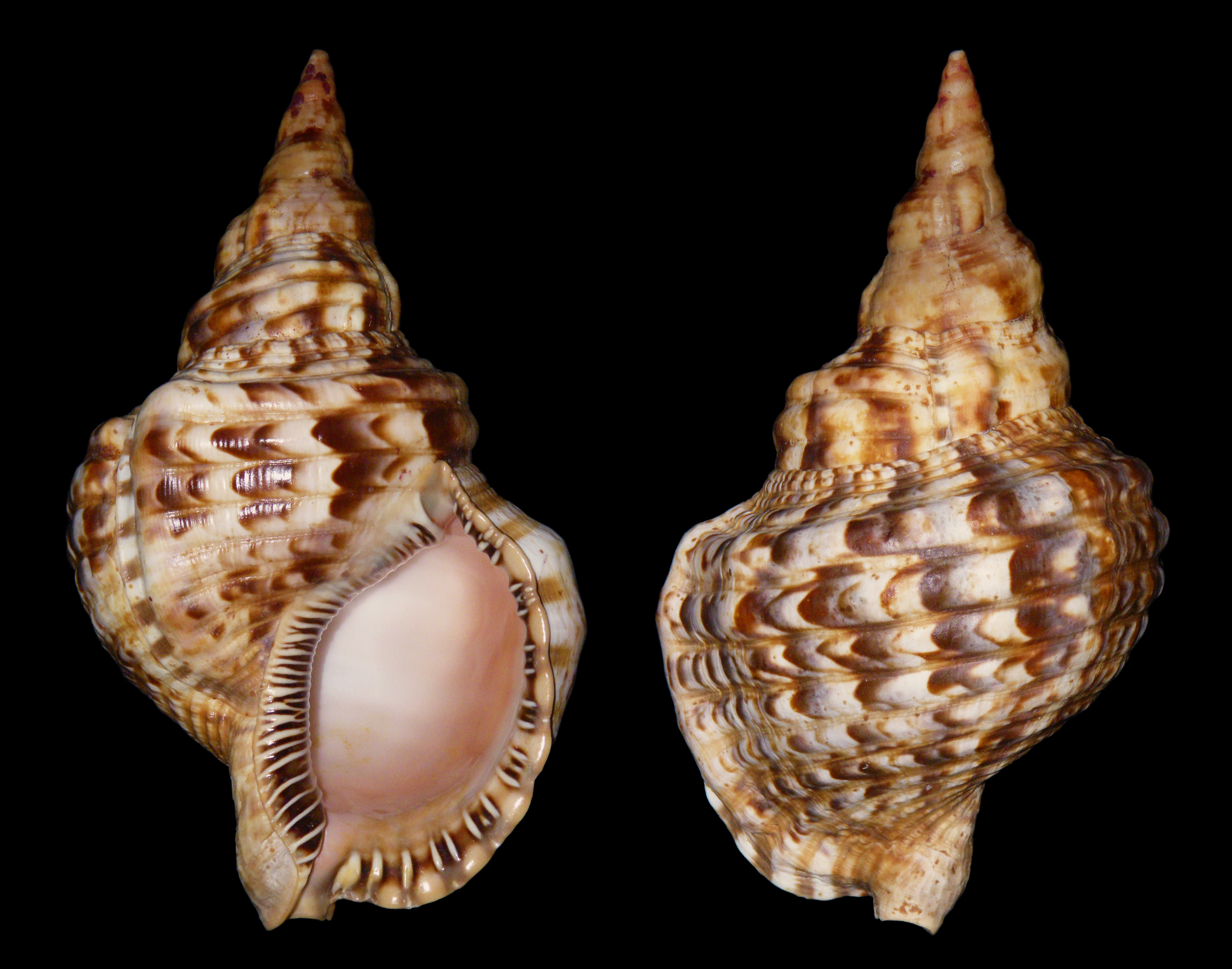
Charonia variegata
