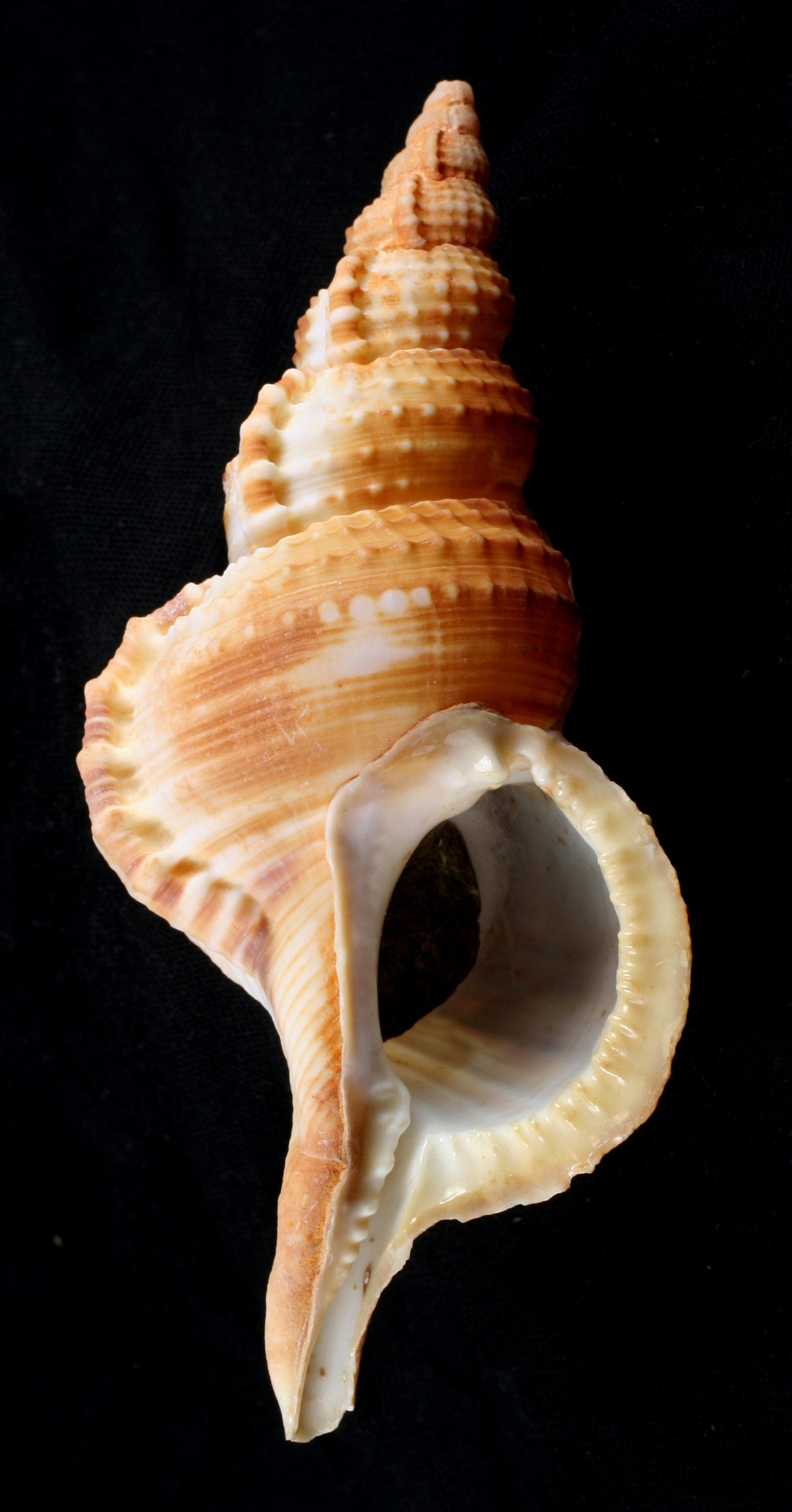
- Apertural view of Ranella olearium (Linnaeus, 1758)

Conservation status
- Near Threatened (IUCN 3.1)

Scientific classification
- Kingdom: Animalia
- Phylum: Mollusca
- Class: Gastropoda
- Subclass: Caenogastropoda
- Order: Littorinimorpha
- Family: Ranellidae
- Genus: Ranella
- Species: R. olearium

Binomial name
- Ranella olearium (Linnaeus, 1758)

Synonyms
- See text

= Ranella olearium =

Species of gastropod

Ranella olearium, common name the wandering triton or the little frog triton or olive trumpet, is a species of large sea snail, a marine gastropod mollusc in the family Ranellidae, the tritons.

== Synonyms ==
Over the course of time, this species has been named many times:

- Argobuccinum dilleri Anderson, F.M. & B. Martin, 1914
- Argobuccinum giganteum curvicauda (f) Coen, G.S., 1941
- Argobuccinum giganteum dilatata (f) Coen, G.S., 1941
- Argobuccinum giganteum duplonodosum Settepassi, F., 1970
- Argobuccinum giganteum exile (f) Settepassi, F., 1970
- Argobuccinum giganteum inflatum Settepassi, F., 1970
- Argobuccinum giganteum intusdentata (f) Coen, G.S., 1941
- Argobuccinum giganteum magnifica (f) Coen, G.S., 1941
- Argobuccinum giganteum nodosecarinata (f) Coen, G.S., 1941
- Argobuccinum giganteum nodosum Settepassi, F., 1970
- Argobuccinum giganteum oceanica (f) Coen, G.S., 1941
- Argobuccinum giganteum rarituberculatum Settepassi, F., 1970
- Argobuccinum giganteum tenuis (f) Coen, G.S., 1941
- Argobuccinum pertuberculiferum Bellardi, L. in Sacco, F., 1872
- Bursa barcellosi Matthews, Rios & Coelho, 1973
- Cymatium olearium Linnaeus
- Gyrina maculata Schumacher, 1817
- Mayena multinodosa Bucknill, 1927
- Murex olearium Linnaeus, 1758 (basionym)
- Murex boveus Risso, A., 1826
- Murex reticularis Born, 1780
- Ranella bronni Michelotti, O.G., 1847
- Ranella budensis Noszky, 1940
- Ranella gigantea Lamarck, 1816
- Ranella incerta Michelotti, O.G., 1847
- Ranella miocenica Michelotti, O.G., 1847
- Ranella multinodosa Bucknill, 1927
- Ranella olearia (Linnaeus, 1758)
- Ranella ostenfeldi Iredale, 1937
- Ranella ranina Lamarck, J.B.P.A. de, 1816
- Ranella rarinodosa Noszky, 1940
- Ranella reticularis altavillensis (f) Gregorio, A. de, 1884
- Ranella reticularis bicanalata (f) Gregorio, A. de, 1884
- Ranella reticularis borniana (f) Gregorio, A. de, 1884
- Ranella reticularis frigida (f) Gregorio, A. de, 1884
- Ranella reticularis mediterranea (f) Gregorio, A. de, 1884
- Ranella reticularis meneghini (f) Gregorio, A. de, 1884
- Ranella reticularis parivaricata (f) Gregorio, A. de, 1884
- Ranella reticularis isba (f) Gregorio, A. de, 1885
- Ranella semilaevis Noszky, 1940
- Ranella simplex Noszky, 1940
- Triton parmense Sismonda, E., 1842

== Distribution ==
This species has a wide distribution. It is found in European waters, in the Mediterranean Sea, in the Central and South Atlantic Ocean (Cape Verde, West Africa), in the Indian Ocean (Mozambique, South Africa), along New Zealand, in the Caribbean Sea (along Colombia) and in the South Western Pacific (not in Galápagos) .

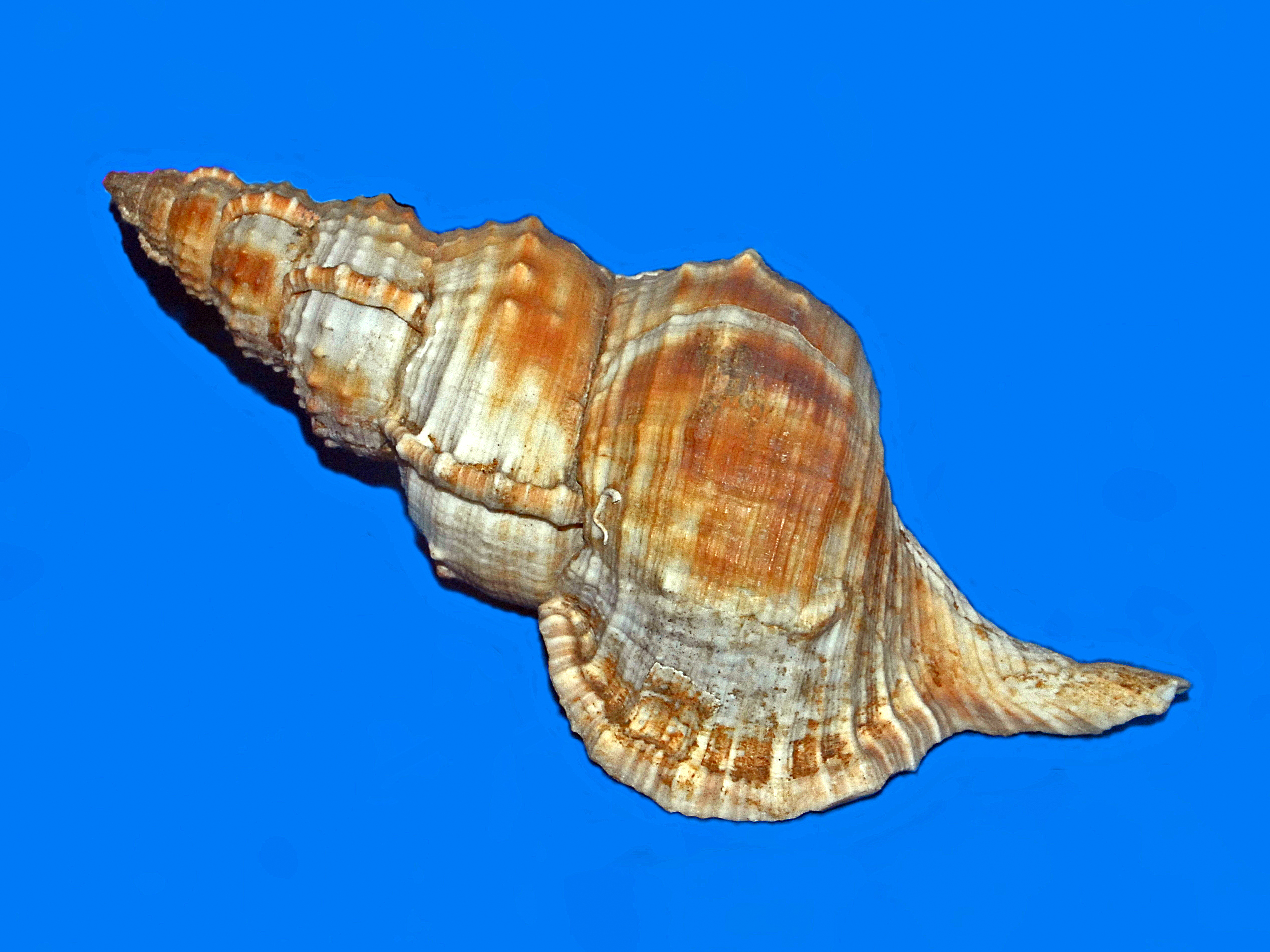
A shell of Ranella olearium from Sicily, on display at the Museo Civico di Storia Naturale di Milano

== Description ==
The shell size of Ranella olearium varies between 90 mm and 240 mm. It is a highly variable species. Usually these large shells are elongated, thick and sturdy, with rounded whorls and with tubercles more or less developed on some sutures. The mouth is large and has a rounded section. The siphonal channel is moderately long and the lip bears many teeth, often double, arranged along the polished, white or brown edge. The external surface of the shell is brown ocher, with clearer tubercles and other protruding parts. The inner surface and the columella are white. In the living individual the shell is commonly covered with an outer velvety layer.

== Habitat ==
These outer shelf-upper bathyal sea snails live on sandy or muddy bottoms. They have been recorded at a minimum depth of 100 m. and at a maximum depth of about 280 m.
