= Fusitriton galea =

Scientific classification
- Kingdom: Animalia
- Phylum: Mollusca
- Class: Gastropoda
- Subclass: Caenogastropoda
- Order: Littorinimorpha
- Family: Cymatiidae
- Genus: Fusitriton
- Species: F. galea

Binomial name
- Fusitriton galea Kuroda & Habe in Habe, 1961

Species of gastropod

Fusitriton galea is a species of predatory sea snail, a marine gastropod mollusk in the family Cymatiidae.

== Description ==
This species attains a size of 120 mm.

== Distribution ==
Pacific Ocean: Vietnam.
