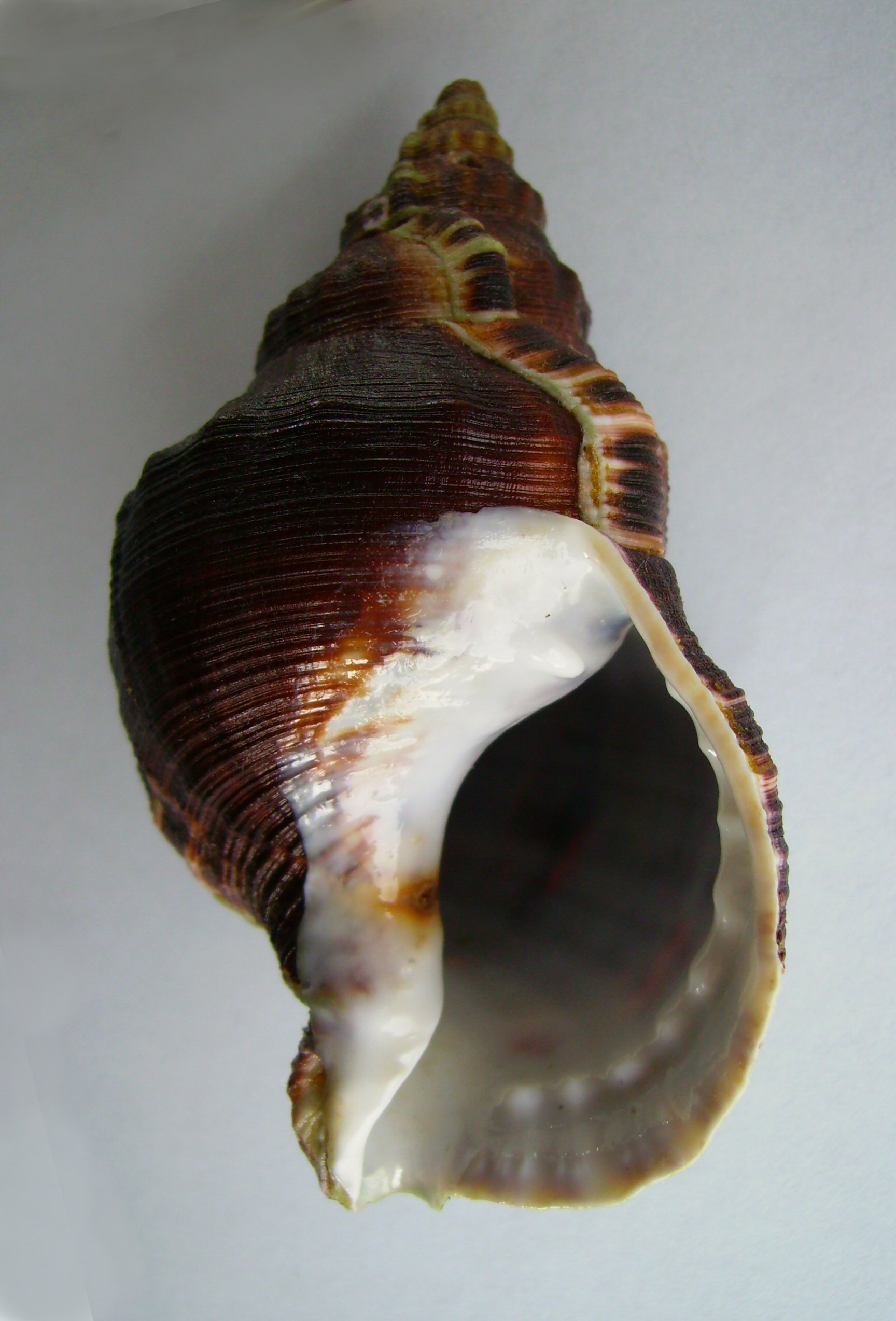
- An apertural view of a shell of Ranella australasia

Scientific classification
- Kingdom: Animalia
- Phylum: Mollusca
- Class: Gastropoda
- Subclass: Caenogastropoda
- Order: Littorinimorpha
- Superfamily: Tonnoidea
- Family: Ranellidae
- Genus: Ranella; Lamarck, 1816

Type species
- Ranella gigantea Lamarck, 1816

Synonyms
- Argobuccinum (Ranella) Lamarck, 1816; Eugyrina Dall, 1904; Gyrina Schumacher, 1817; Gyrinopsis Dall, 1925; Mayena Iredale, 1917; Ranella (Apollon) Montfort, 1810

= Ranella =

Genus of gastropods

Ranella is a genus of large warm-water and tropical sea snails, marine gastropod molluscs in the family Ranellidae, the tritons.

== Shell description ==
The shells of species within this genus are very large and solid, with a tall spire, a rounded aperture, a broadly flanged outer lip, and a moderately long siphonal canal, which is flexed and inclined to the left. The varices are prominent and rounded, but are hollowed out on the inside.

== Species ==
Species within the genus Ranella include:

- Ranella australasia (Perry, 1811)
- † Ranella bellardii (Weinkauff, 1868)
- Ranella gemmifera (Euthyme, 1889)
- †Ranella kaiparaensis (Finlay, 1924)
- Ranella olearium Linnaeus, 1758

Synonyms

- Ranella reticularis (Linnaeus, 1758) sensu Deshayes, 1839: synonym of Ranella olearium (Linnaeus, 1758)
