= Fusitriton laudandus =

Scientific classification
- Kingdom: Animalia
- Phylum: Mollusca
- Class: Gastropoda
- Subclass: Caenogastropoda
- Order: Littorinimorpha
- Family: Cymatiidae
- Genus: Fusitriton
- Species: F. laudandus

Binomial name
- Fusitriton laudandus Finlay, 1926

Synonyms
- Fusitriton futuristi Mestayer, 1927

Species of gastropod

Fusitriton laudandus is a species of predatory sea snail, a marine gastropod mollusk in the family Cymatiidae.
