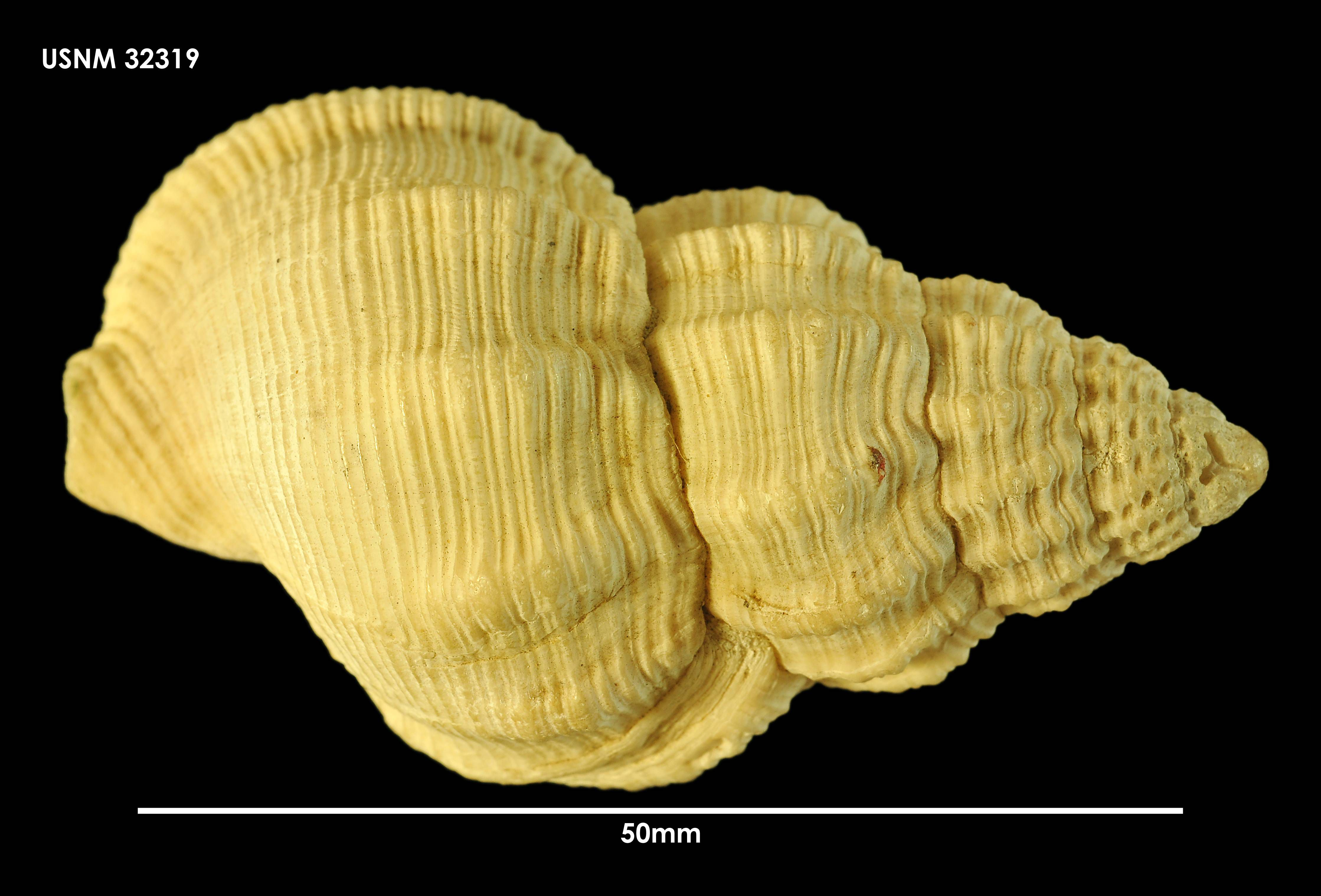
- Shell of Priene scabrum (specimen at the Smithsonian Institution)

Scientific classification
- Kingdom: Animalia
- Phylum: Mollusca
- Class: Gastropoda
- Subclass: Caenogastropoda
- Order: Littorinimorpha
- Superfamily: Tonnoidea
- Family: Ranellidae
- Genus: Priene
- Species: P. scabrum

Binomial name
- Priene scabrum (King, 1832)

Synonyms
- Argobuccinum rude (Broderip, 1833); Argobuccinum scabrum (King, 1832); Liohindsia dimidiata Coen, 1947; Ranella scabra (P. P. King, 1832) superseded combination; Triton rudis Broderip, 1833; Triton scaber King, 1832

= Priene scabrum =

Species of gastropod

Priene scabrum is a species of predatory sea snail, a marine gastropod mollusk in the family Ranellidae, the triton snails, triton shells or tritons.

== Description ==
The length of the shell attains 52 mm.

The solid shell is ventricose. The whorls are rounded with few varices. The siphonal canal is short. The outer lip is dentated internally.

== Distribution ==
This marine species occurs in the South Pacific Ocean off South America.
