= Fusitriton brasiliensis =

Scientific classification
- Kingdom: Animalia
- Phylum: Mollusca
- Class: Gastropoda
- Subclass: Caenogastropoda
- Order: Littorinimorpha
- Family: Cymatiidae
- Genus: Fusitriton
- Species: F. brasiliensis

Binomial name
- Fusitriton brasiliensis T. Cossignani & V. Cossignani, 2003

Species of gastropod

Fusitriton brasiliensis is a species of predatory sea snail, a marine gastropod mollusk in the family Cymatiidae.

== Description ==
The maximum recorded shell length is 123 mm.

== Habitat ==
Minimum recorded depth is 1200 m. Maximum recorded depth is 1200 m.
