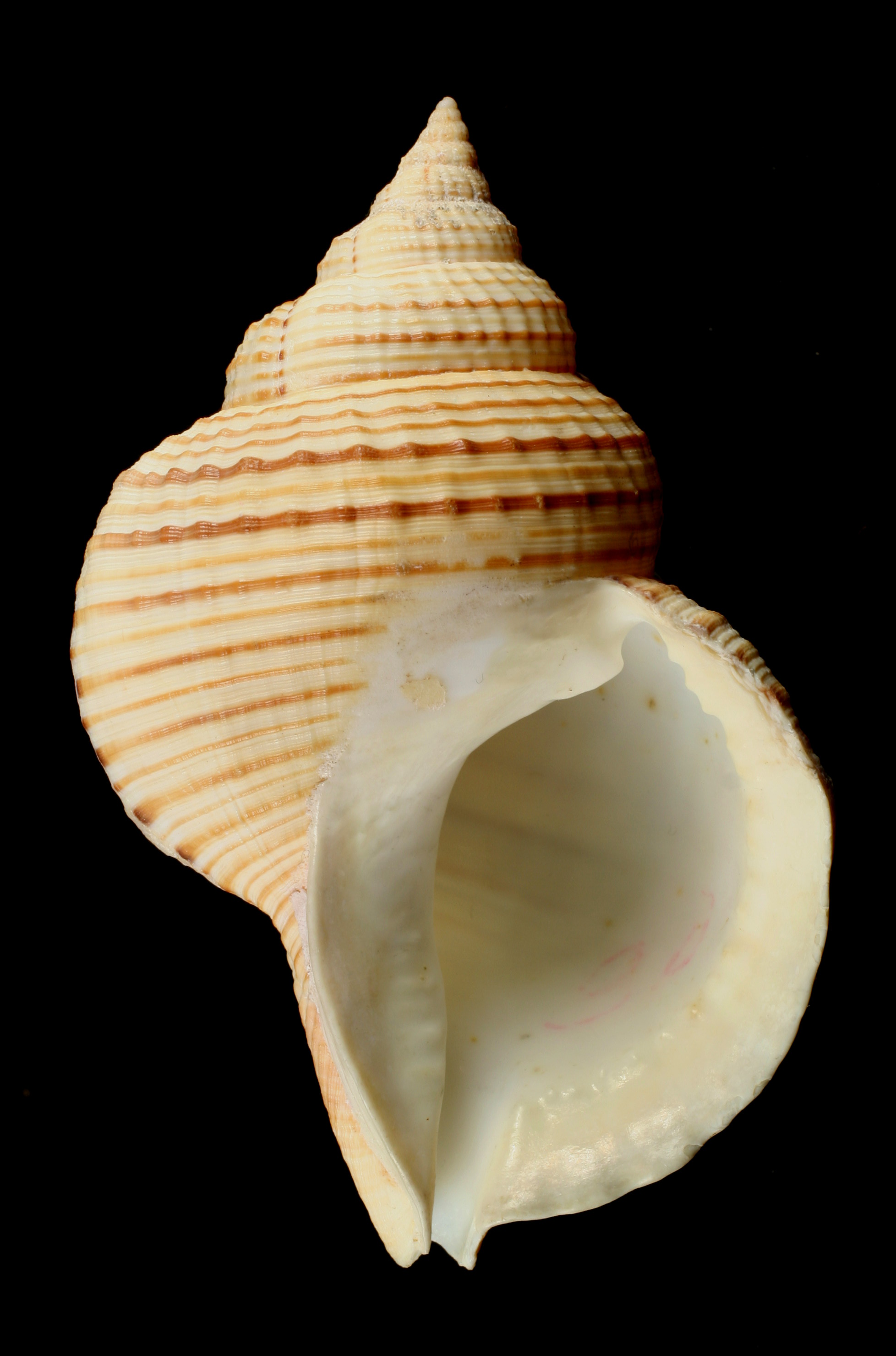
- Shell

Scientific classification
- Kingdom: Animalia
- Phylum: Mollusca
- Class: Gastropoda
- Subclass: Caenogastropoda
- Order: Littorinimorpha
- Family: Cymatiidae
- Genus: Argobuccinum
- Species: A. pustulosum

Binomial name
- Argobuccinum pustulosum (Lightfoot, 1786)

Synonyms
- Argobuccinum argus (Gmelin, 1791); Argobuccinum proditor (Frauenfeld, 1865); Argobuccinum proditor proditor (Frauenfeld, 1865); Argobuccinum proditor tristanensis Dell, 1963; Argobuccinum pustulosum tumidum (Dunker, 1862); Argobuccinum ranelliforme (King, 1832); Argobuccinum tumidum (Dunker, 1862); Buccinum pustulosum Lightfoot, 1786; Bursa (Apollon) proditor Frauenfeld, 1865; Bursa tumida Dunker, 1862; Cassidea tuberculata Fischer von Waldheim, 1807; Murex argus Gmelin, 1791; Ranella ampullacea Valenciennes, 1858; Ranella kingii d'Orbigny, 1841; Ranella polyzonalis Lamarck, 1816; Ranella vexillum G. B. Sowerby II, 1835; Triton ranelliforme King, 1832; Tritonium argobuccinum Röding, 1798

= Argobuccinum pustulosum =

Species of gastropod

Argobuccinum pustulosum, the pustular triton, is a species of predatory sea snail, a marine gastropod mollusk in the family Cymatiidae.

== Description ==
The large swollen shell of this species has prominent varices.

The maximum recorded shell length of the synonym Argobuccinum proditor tristanense is 80 mm.

Minimum recorded depth of the synonym Argobuccinum proditor tristanense is 0 m. Maximum recorded depth is 280 m.
