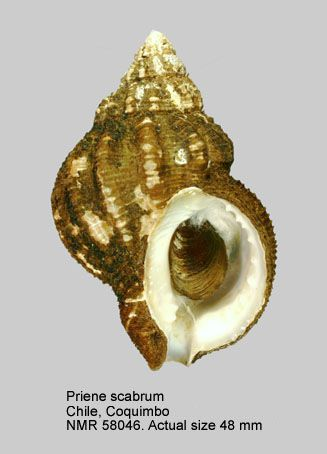
- Shell of Priene scabrum

Scientific classification
- Kingdom: Animalia
- Phylum: Mollusca
- Class: Gastropoda
- Subclass: Caenogastropoda
- Order: Littorinimorpha
- Superfamily: Tonnoidea
- Family: Ranellidae
- Genus: Priene; H. Adams & A. Adams, 1858

Type species
- Murex anus Linnaeus, 1758

Synonyms
- Argobuccinum (Priene) H. Adams & A. Adams, 1858; Lampusia (Priene) H. Adams & A. Adams, 1858; Liohindsia Coen, 1947; Tritonium (Priene) H. Adams & A. Adams, 1858 (original rank)

= Priene (gastropod) =

Genus of gastropods

Priene is a genus of predatory sea snails, marine gastropod mollusks in the family Ranellidae, the triton snails, triton shells or tritons.

== Species ==
Species within the genus Priene include:

- Priene scabrum (King, 1832)
