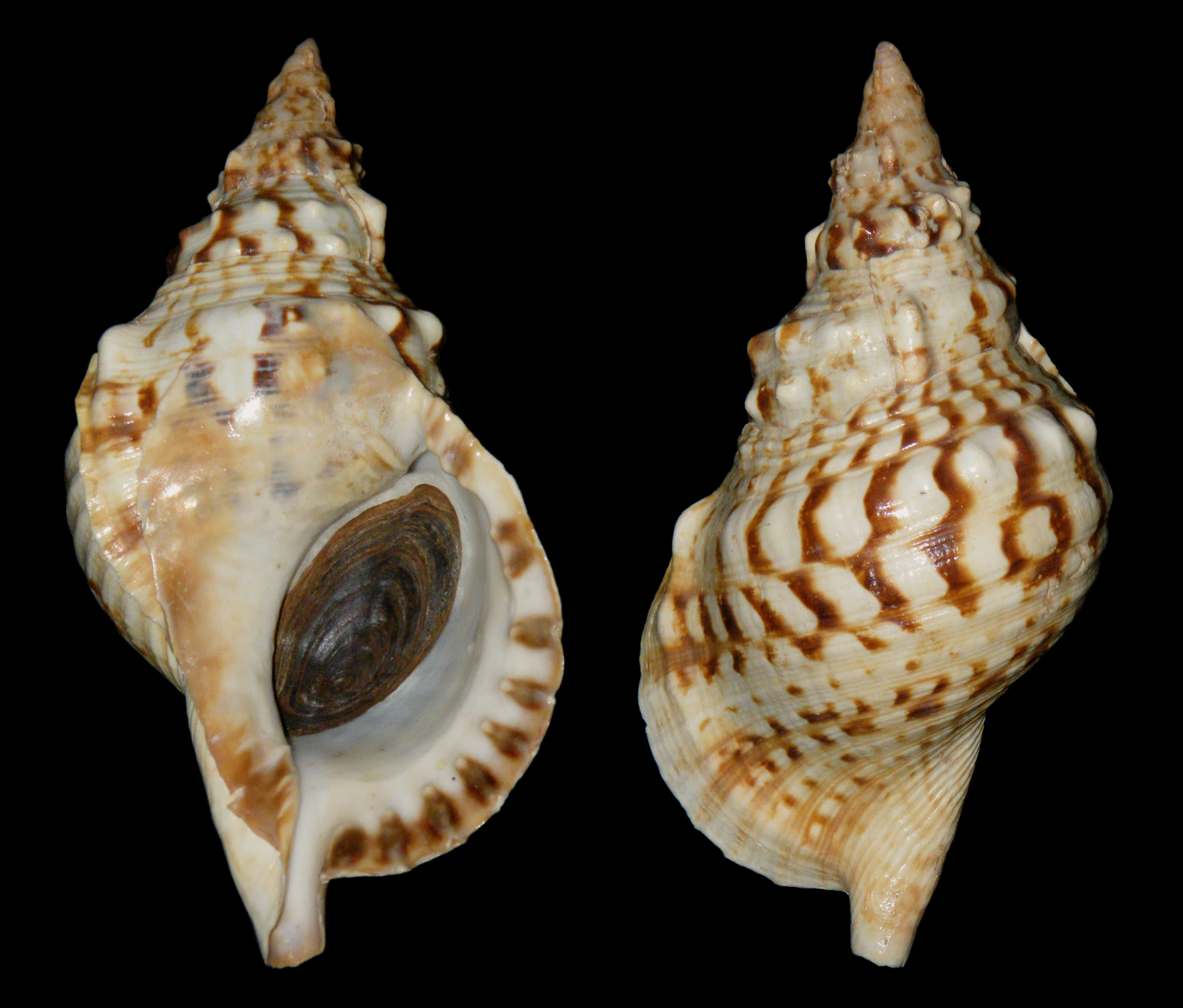
- Two views of a shell of Charonia lampas form nodifera, with operculum

Scientific classification
- Kingdom: Animalia
- Phylum: Mollusca
- Class: Gastropoda
- Subclass: Caenogastropoda
- Order: Littorinimorpha
- Family: Charoniidae
- Genus: Charonia
- Species: C. lampas

Binomial name
- Charonia lampas (Linnaeus, 1758)

Synonyms
- See text.

= Charonia lampas =

Species of gastropod

Charonia lampas, common name the pink lady, is a species of predatory sea snail, a marine gastropod mollusk in the family Charoniidae.

== Distribution ==
This marine species has a wide distribution: the North Sea, the North Atlantic Ocean (Azores, Madeira, the Canaries, Cape Verdes), the Atlantic Ocean (off the African coasts), the Mediterranean Sea, and the Indian Ocean (off Madagascar, the East coast of South Africa).

== Description ==
The maximum recorded shell length is 390 mm. The large shell measures up to 400 mm on mainland locations, to 200 mm off island and seamount sites. The protoconch is multispiral, normally eroded except on very juvenile specimens. The teleoconch consists of 8–9 whorls with a moderately high, conical spire and convex whorls, the last one ample and making up slightly more than two-thirds of the total height. The spire whorls are vaguely shouldered, with very flat spiral cords separated by poorly defined, rather narrow interspaces, the shoulder covered by a much broader and flatter cord and commonly, but not always, bearing a spiral series of knobs, paralleled to the abapical side by lesser flat cords with or without spiral rows of knobs. The large aperture is oval in shape, with an elaborate peristome. The outer lip is flaring, thickened at a short distance from the edge and with internal denticles. The inner part of the peristome shows an appressed parietal callus continued into a foliated columellar callus, which has a raised edge overhanging the siphonal canal on large specimens, and bears indistinct ridges towards the edge. The colour pattern is very characteristic, with articulated spiral bands of light patches on the knobs and dark brown in the interspaces, alternating with medium brown uniform bands. The peristome is white with dark brown denticles on the outer lip and a brownish to reddish hue on the edge of columellar callus.

== Habitat ==
Minimum recorded depth is 8 m. Maximum recorded depth is 50 m.

== Uses ==
- During the Neolithic period Charonia lampas shells were used in necklaces.
- There is evidence of the shell being used as a wind music instrument.

== Synonyms ==
- Charonia capax Finlay, 1926
- Charonia capax euclioides Finlay, 1926
- Charonia euclia Hedley, 1914
- Charonia euclia instructa Iredale, 1929
- Charonia lampas lampas (Linnaeus, 1758)
- Charonia lampas pustulata (Euthyme, 1889)
- Charonia mirabilis Parenzan, 1970
- Charonia nodifera Linnaeus
- Charonia nodifera var. euclia Hedley, 1914
- Charonia powelli Cotton, 1957
- Charonia rubicunda (Perry, 1811)
- Charonia sauliae (Reeve, 1844)
- Charonia sauliae macilenta Kuroda & Habe in Habe, 1961
- Eutritonium lampas Linnaeus
- Murex gyrinoides Brocchi, 1814
- Murex lampas Linnaeus, 1758
- Murex nerei Dillwyn, 1817
- Nyctilochus alfredensis Bartsch, 1915
- Ranella lampas (Linnaeus, 1758)
- Septa rubicunda Perry, 1811
- Simpulum nodiferum (Lamarck, 1822)
- Simpulum nodiferum var. major Pallary, 1900
- Simpulum nodiferum var. minor Pallary, 1900
- Triton australe Lamarck, 1822
- Triton gyrinoides (Brocchi, 1814)
- Triton gyrinoides var. carinata de Gregorio, 1893
- Triton gyrinoides var. cochleosocia de Gregorio, 1893
- Triton gyrinoides var. ficarazzensis de Gregorio, 1884
- Triton gyrinoides var. imperans de Gregorio, 1884
- Triton gyrinoides var. inflectilabrum de Gregorio, 1884
- Triton gyrinoides var. labroplita de Gregorio, 1884
- Triton gyrinoides var. normalis de Gregorio, 1893
- Triton gyrinoides var. singilla de Gregorio, 1884
- Triton nodiferum Lamarck, 1822
- Triton nodiferum var. glabra Weinkauff, 1868
- Triton sauliae Reeve, 1844
- Tritonium glabrum Locard, 1886
- Tritonium mediterraneum Risso, 1826
- Tritonium opis Röding, 1798
- Tritonium pustulatuml Euthyme, 1889
- Tritonium pustulatum var. minor Euthyme, 1889
- Tritonium pustulatum var. varicosum Euthyme, 1889
