= Fusitriton takedai =

Scientific classification
- Kingdom: Animalia
- Phylum: Mollusca
- Class: Gastropoda
- Subclass: Caenogastropoda
- Order: Littorinimorpha
- Family: Cymatiidae
- Genus: Fusitriton
- Species: F. takedai

Binomial name
- Fusitriton takedai Habe, 1979

Species of gastropod

Fusitriton takedai is a species of predatory sea snail, a marine gastropod mollusk in the family Cymatiidae.
