= Obscuranella =

Scientific classification
- Kingdom: Animalia
- Phylum: Mollusca
- Class: Gastropoda
- Subclass: Caenogastropoda
- Order: Littorinimorpha
- Family: Ranellidae
- Genus: Obscuranella; Kantor & Harasewych, 2000

Genus of gastropods

Obscuranella is a genus of predatory sea snails, marine gastropod mollusks in the family Ranellidae, the triton snails, triton shells or tritons.

== Species ==
Species within the genus Obscuranella include:

- Obscuranella papyrodes Kantor & Harasewych, 2000
