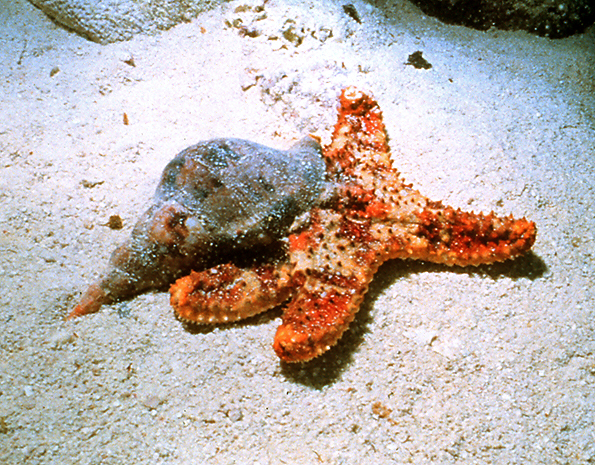
- A live C. variegata feeding on a starfish
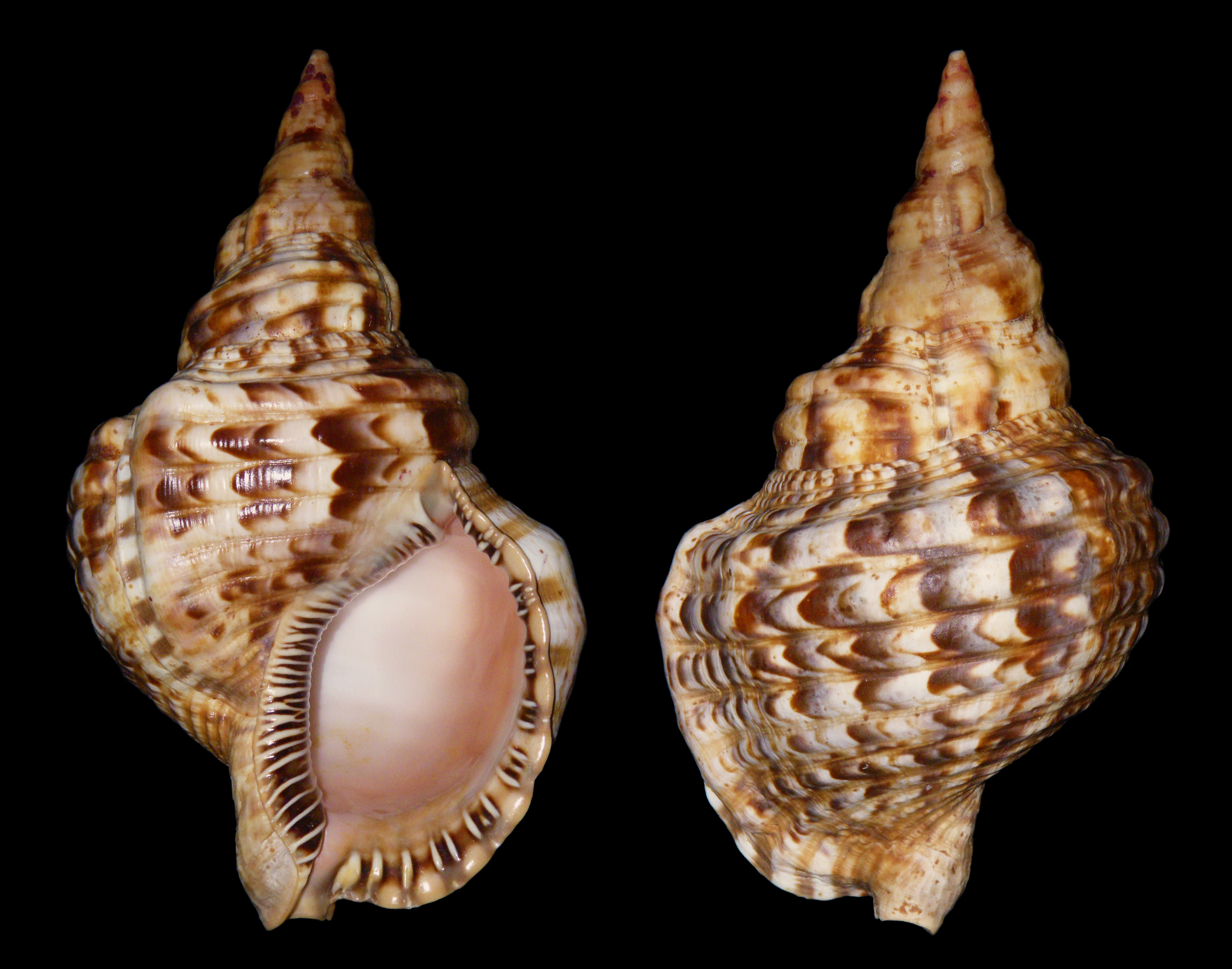
- Two views of a shell of C. variegata

Scientific classification
- Kingdom: Animalia
- Phylum: Mollusca
- Class: Gastropoda
- Subclass: Caenogastropoda
- Order: Littorinimorpha
- Family: Charoniidae
- Genus: Charonia
- Species: C. variegata

Binomial name
- Charonia variegata (Lamarck, 1816)

Synonyms
- List: Charonia atlantica E. Bowdich, 1822; Charonia tritonis variegata Lamarck, 1816; Triton atlantica Bowditch, 1822; Tritonium sulcatum A. Risso, 1826; Triton nobilis Conrad, 1848; Triton variegata Lamarck, 1816 (basionym); Charonia nobilis T. A. Conrad, 1849; Charonia seguenziae (Aradas & Benoit, 1872); Charonia variegatus Reeve; Triton seguenziae Aradas & Benoit, 1872 (basionym)

= Charonia variegata =

Species of gastropod

Charonia variegata, the Atlantic triton or Atlantic triton's trumpet, is a species of predatory sea snail, a marine gastropod mollusc in the family Charoniidae, the triton snails, triton shells, or tritons.

== Distribution ==
This species has a wide distribution. It has been found in European waters, the Mediterranean Sea, in the Atlantic Ocean along Macaronesia, North West Africa, and Tanzania, in the Caribbean Sea and the Gulf of Mexico, and from North Carolina to eastern Brazil.

== Description ==
The shell size varies up to 375 millimetres (14.8 in) The maximum recorded shell length is 374 millimetres (14.7 in) This conical shell has an elongated and sharply pointed spire without any knobs, but somewhat squatter than the spire of the Pacific Charonia tritonis. The lower whorls are unevenly swollen with a varix and bulge over the suture. The suture then descends in an uneven spiral. The parietal callus is lined with a narrow, dark inner lip, covered with regularly spaced, brown, rib-like plicae. The outer lip is scalloped but less projected and toothed with about 10 pairs of rib-like teeth superimposed on square, dark brown blotches. The color of the shell is mottled in shades of creamy white to yellow with brown markings. The inside of the large aperture is orange pink, and the interior is white.

Atlantic Triton's Trumpet on Bonaire (Caribbean Netherlands) in September 2026

The species is highly variable and does not have any known geographic subspecies.

The veliger larvae have a period of pelagic development of more than three months, drifting in the trans-Atlantic currents. These larvae are the largest known of any Ranellidae in the Atlantic; the larval shell reaches 5 millimetres (0.20 in) when fully developed.

== Habitat ==
Minimum recorded depth is 0.3 metres (0.98 ft) 0.3 m. Maximum recorded depth is 110 metres (360 ft). Thin-shelled 'crabbed' examples have been found in traps off the west coast of Barbados at depths around 155–185 metres (509–607 ft).

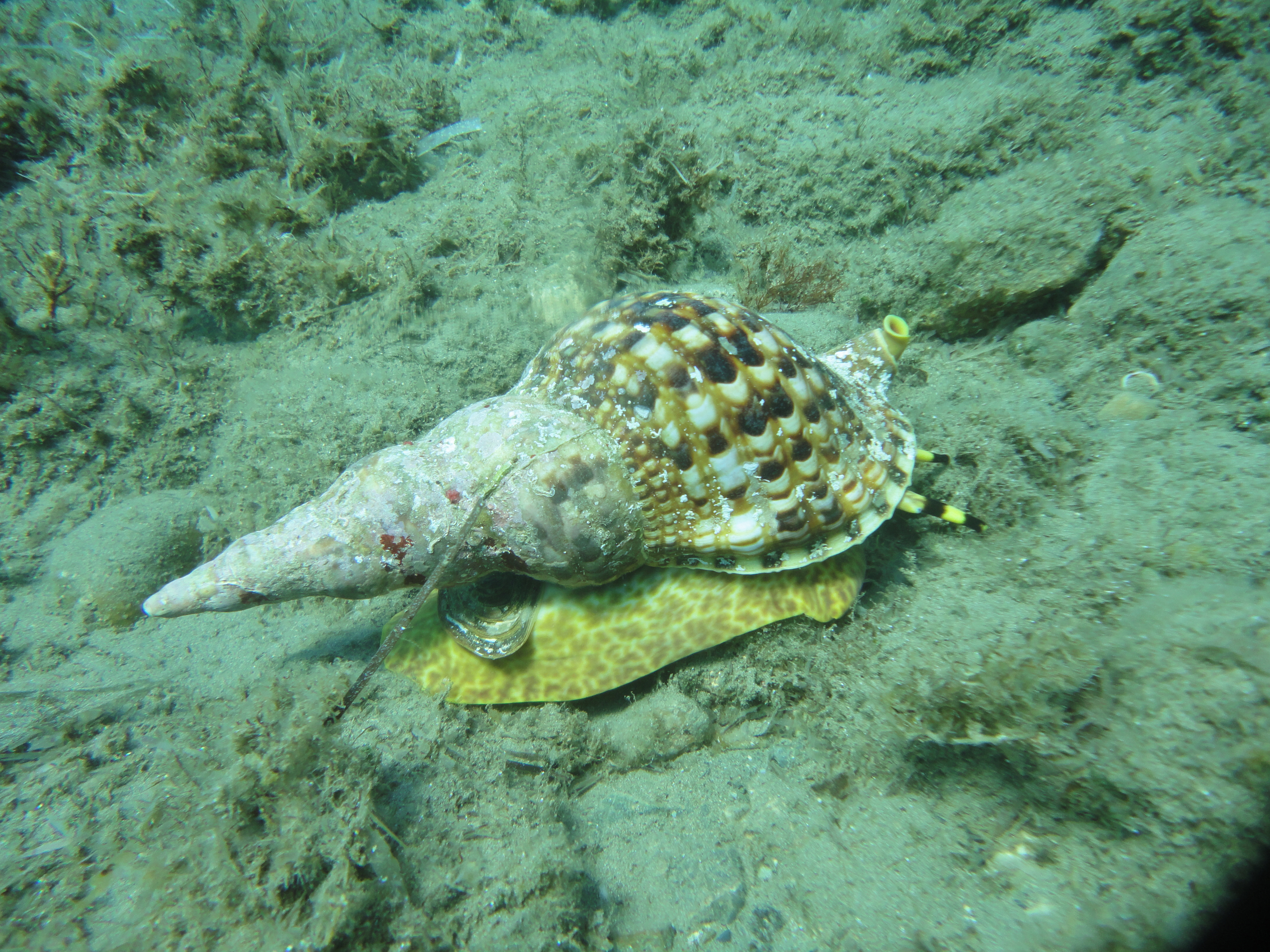
A live Charonia variegata found in south Crete, Greece
