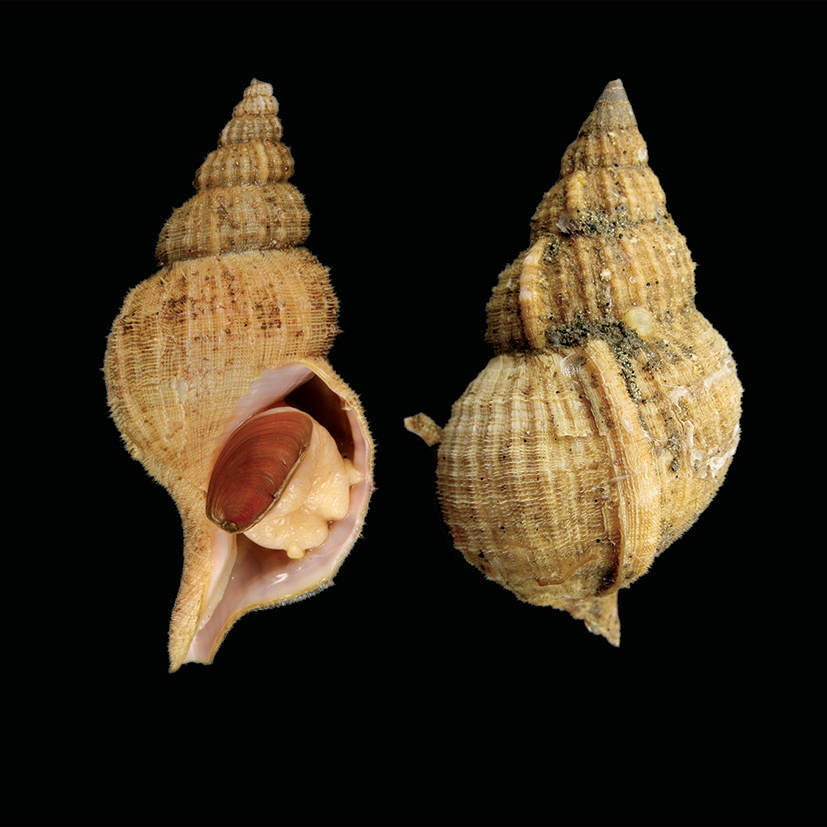
- Shell of Fusitriton magellanicus

Scientific classification
- Kingdom: Animalia
- Phylum: Mollusca
- Class: Gastropoda
- Subclass: Caenogastropoda
- Order: Littorinimorpha
- Family: Cymatiidae
- Genus: Fusitriton
- Species: F. magellanicus

Binomial name
- Fusitriton magellanicus (Röding, 1798)

Synonyms
- Argobuccinum (Fusitriton) murrayi E. A. Smith, 1891; Argobuccinum magellanicus (Röding, 1798); Argobuccinum murrayi E. A. Smith, 1891; Fusitriton algoensis Tomlin, 1947; Fusitriton murrayi (E.A. Smith, 1891); Fusitriton magellanicus murrayi (E. A. Smith, 1891); Lampusia (Priene) murrayi E. A. Smith, 1891; Lampusia murrayi E. A. Smith, 1891; Neptunea magellanicus Röding, 1798 (original combination); Triton cancellatus Lamarck, 1816

= Fusitriton magellanicus =

Species of gastropod

Fusitriton magellanicus, the waffle whelk, is a species of predatory sea snail, a marine gastropod mollusk in the family Cymatiidae.

== Description ==
The length of the shell reaches up to 145 mm, but is usually less.

The shell is broadly spindle-shaped and relatively lightweight. Its sculpture is reticulate (cross-hatched), with nodules at the intersections, most pronounced on the spire and often weaker on the adult body whorl. The spire may exhibit distinct growth varices, though these can be weak or absent in some cases. The aperture is large, extending into a moderately long, slightly sinuous siphonal canal.

The shell is white, sometimes featuring pinkish spiral ridges. In living specimens, the surface is covered by a bristly, light brown periostracum, with the bristles being especially conspicuous in juvenile shells and arranged in a spiral pattern.

== Distribution ==
This marine species is endemic to South Africa, occurring off the Agulhas Bank and throughout West coast region at depths between 50 m and 550 m. The most common whelk species occurring on West coast.
