= Fusitriton retiolus =

Scientific classification
- Kingdom: Animalia
- Phylum: Mollusca
- Class: Gastropoda
- Subclass: Caenogastropoda
- Order: Littorinimorpha
- Family: Cymatiidae
- Genus: Fusitriton
- Species: F. retiolus

Binomial name
- Fusitriton retiolus (Hedley, 1914)

Synonyms
- Argobuccinum retiolus Hedley, 1914

Species of gastropod

Fusitriton retiolus is a species of large predatory sea snail, a marine gastropod mollusc in the family Cymatiidae.

== Distribution ==
This species occurs in:

- Australia
- New Zealand.
