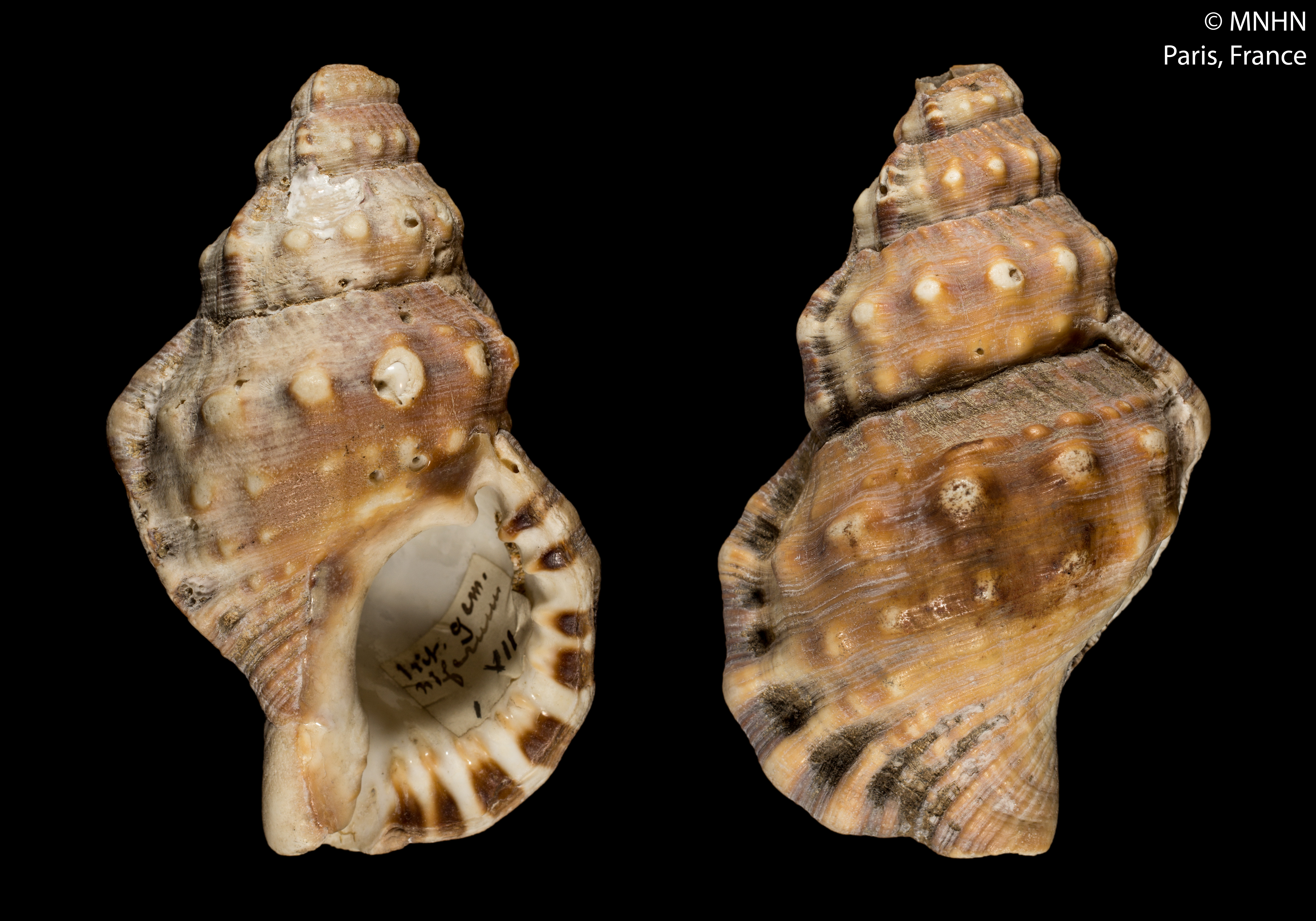
- Shell of Ranella gemmifera (specimen at MNHN, Paris)

Scientific classification
- Kingdom: Animalia
- Phylum: Mollusca
- Class: Gastropoda
- Subclass: Caenogastropoda
- Order: Littorinimorpha
- Family: Ranellidae
- Genus: Ranella
- Species: R. gemmifera

Binomial name
- Ranella gemmifera (Euthyme, 1889)

Synonyms
- Charonia poecilostoma Smith, 1915; Eugyrina gemmifera lepta Bartsch, 1915; Ranella gemmifera var. minor Euthyme, 1889; Ranella leucostoma var. poecilostoma Martens, 1904; Tritonium gemmiferum Euthyme, 1889 Ranella australasia gemmifera (Euthyme, 1889)

= Ranella gemmifera =

Species of gastropod

Ranella gemmifera is a species of predatory sea snail, a marine gastropod mollusk in the family Ranellidae, the triton snails, triton shells or tritons.

== Description ==
The maximum recorded shell length is 126 mm.

== Habitat ==
Minimum recorded depth is 0 m. Maximum recorded depth is 70 m.
