= Antarctoneptunea aurora =

Scientific classification
- Kingdom: Animalia
- Phylum: Mollusca
- Class: Gastropoda
- Subclass: Caenogastropoda
- Order: Neogastropoda
- Family: Austrosiphonidae
- Genus: Antarctoneptunea
- Species: A. aurora

Binomial name
- Antarctoneptunea aurora (Hedley, 1916)

Synonyms
- Troschelia? Smith, 1907; Fusitriton aurora Hedley, 1916; Fusitriton antarcticus Powell, A.W.B., 1958

Species of gastropod

Antarctoneptunea aurora is a species of sea snail, a marine gastropod mollusk in the family Austrosiphonidae.

== Description ==
Antarctoneptunea aurora is a small to medium-sized buccinid whelk species.

== Distribution ==
Antarctoneptunea aurora occurs in the Southern Ocean surrounding Antarctica, particularly from the Ross Sea. Specimens have been collected from depths between 188 and 603 metres.
