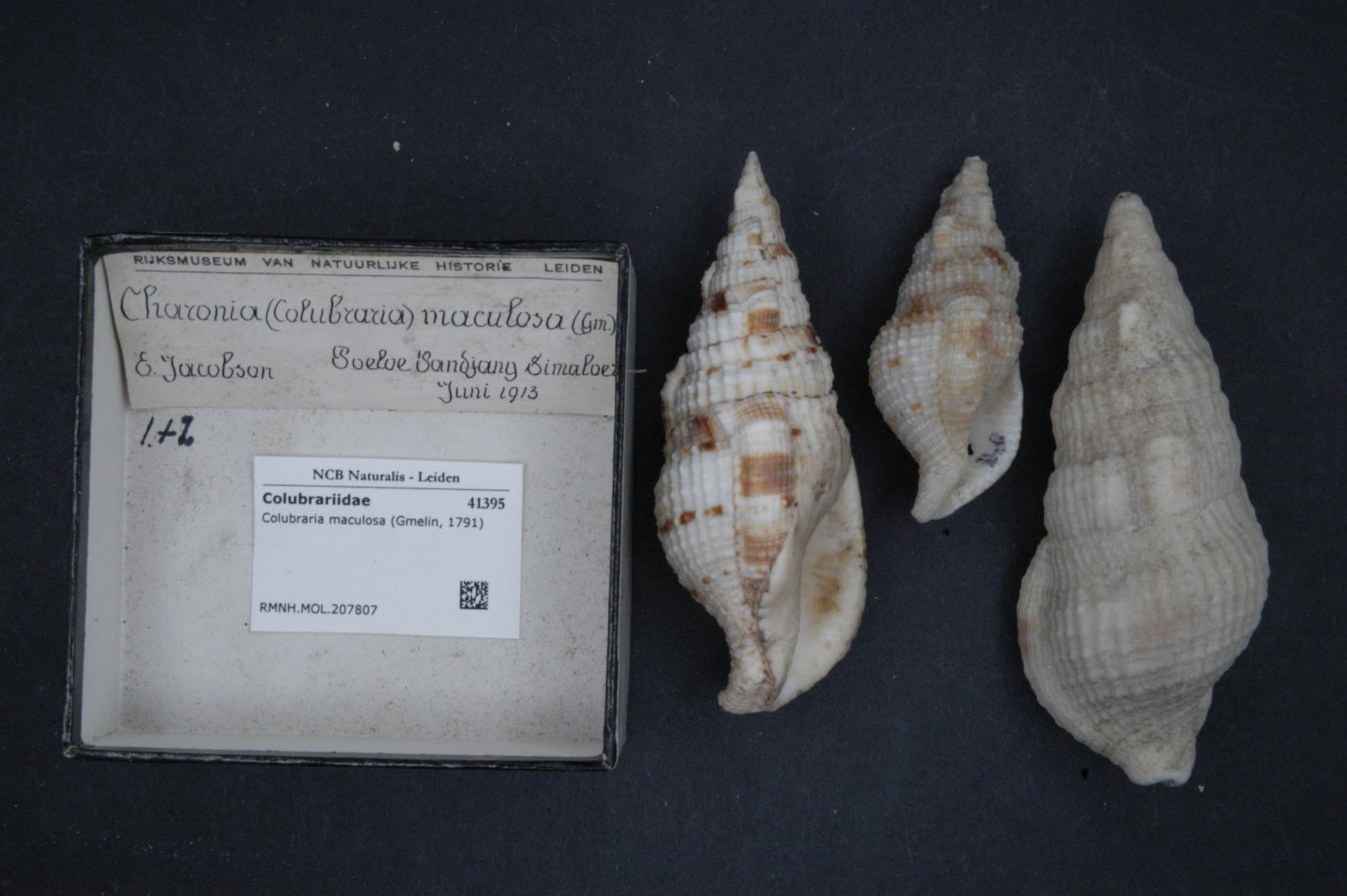

Scientific classification
- Kingdom: Animalia
- Phylum: Mollusca
- Class: Gastropoda
- Subclass: Caenogastropoda
- Order: Neogastropoda
- Family: Colubrariidae
- Genus: Colubraria
- Species: C. maculosa

Binomial name
- Colubraria maculosa Gmelin, 1790

Synonyms
- Charonia maculosum (Gmelin, 1791) (new combination); Colubraria granulata Schumacher, 1817; Eutritonium maculosum (Gmelin, 1791) (new combination); Murex maculosus Gmelin, 1791; Murex muricatus Lightfoot, 1786

= Colubraria maculosa =

Species of gastropod

Colubraria maculosa is a species of sea snail, a marine gastropod mollusk in the family Colubrariidae.

== Distribution ==
This species is found in the seas around Madagascar and Mauritius.
