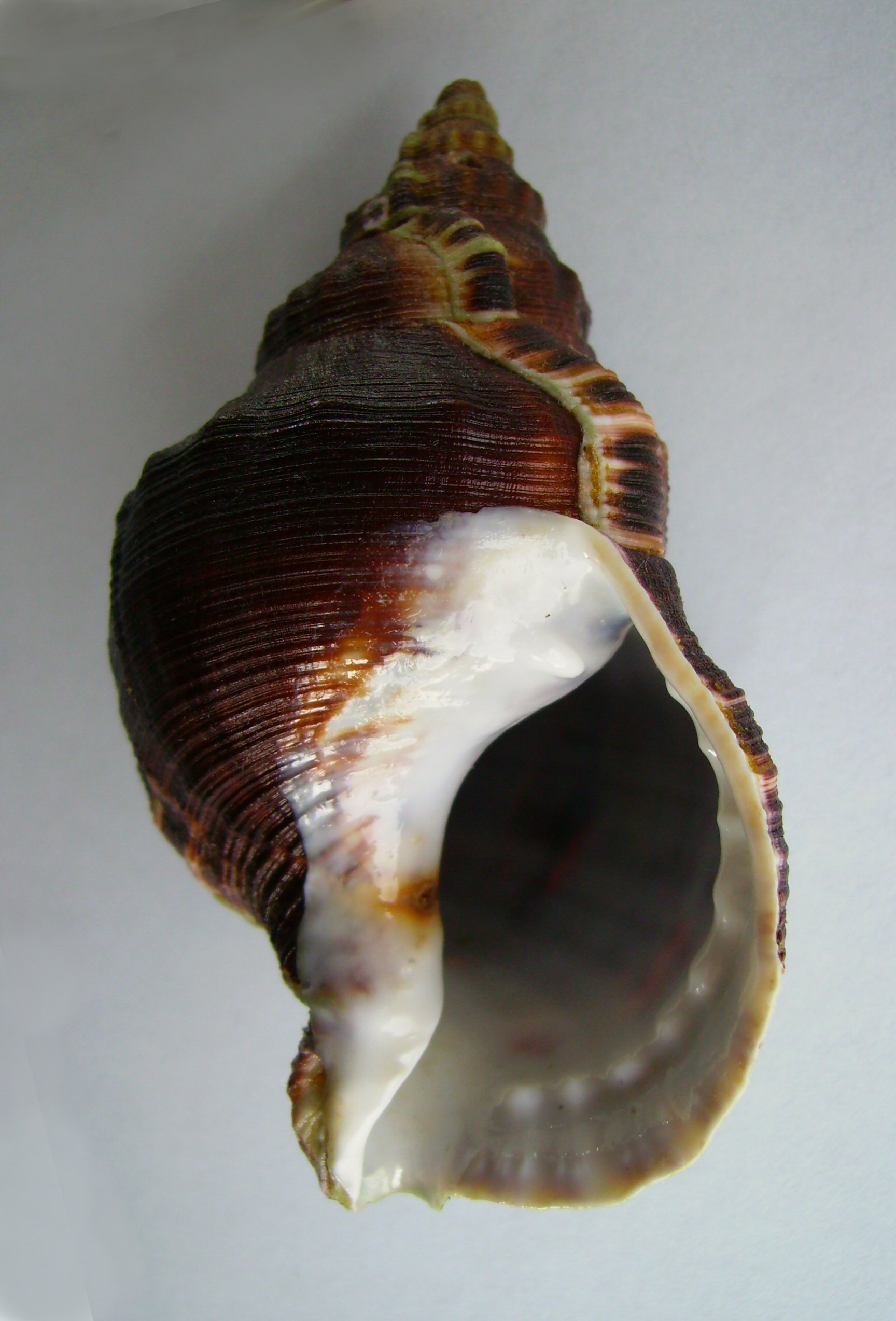
- Ranella australasia

Scientific classification
- Kingdom: Animalia
- Phylum: Mollusca
- Class: Gastropoda
- Subclass: Caenogastropoda
- Order: Littorinimorpha
- Superfamily: Tonnoidea
- Family: Ranellidae; Gray, 1854

Genera
- See text

Synonyms
- Tritoniidae H. Adams & A. Adams, 1853 (Invalid: type genus a junior homonym of Tritonium O.F. Müller, 1776. Also homonym of Tritoniidae Lamarck, 1809 based on Tritonia Cuvier, 1797); Tritoninae Gray, 1847 (Invalid: type genus placed on the Official Index by Opinion 886 [junior homonym of Triton Linnaeus, 1758])

= Ranellidae =

Family of gastropods

The Ranellidae, common name the triton shells or tritons, are a taxonomic family of small to very large predatory sea snails, marine gastropod mollusks in the order Littorinimorpha.

== Distribution ==
The Tritons are principally equatorial in their geographical distribution, and belong more especially to the Asiatic fauna. Those with the siphonal canal very much produced are obtained from deep water. The cancellated forms are from sand, in deep water; and those covered with an epidermis are chiefly from sandy mud, in from six to thirty fathoms.

== Subfamilies ==
According to the taxonomy of the Gastropoda by Bouchet & Rocroi, 2005, the family Ranellidae consisted of two subfamilies:

- Ranellinae Gray, 1854 – synonyms: Agrobuccininae Kilias, 1973; Simpulidae Dautzenberg, 1900; Gyrineinae Higo & Goto, 1993 (n.a.)
- Cymatiinae Iredale, 1913 (1854) – synonyms: Tritoniidae H. Adams & A. Adams, 1853 (inv.); Neptunellinae Gray, 1854; Lampusiidae Newton, 1891; Lotoriidae Harris, 1897; Septidae Dall & Simpson, 1901; Aquillidae Pilsbry, 1904; Nyctilochidae Dall, 1912; Charoniinae Powell, 1933

The Cymatiinae now form a separate family: Cymatiidae.

== Genera ==
The family Ranellidae contains the following genera:

- † Ameranella Beu, 1988
- † Antarctiranella Stilwell, Zinsmeister & Oleinik, 2004
- † Crassicymatium Beu, 2010
- Obscuranella Kantor & Harasewych, 2000
- Priene H. Adams & A. Adams, 1858
- Ranella Lamarck, 1816
- † Ranellina – assigned to Bursidae by Palmer and Brann in 1966
- † Trachytriton Meek, 1864

Synonyms

- Subfamily Charoniinae Powell, 1933: synonym of Charoniidae Powell, 1933
- Subfamily Cymatiinae Iredale, 1913 (1854): synonym of Cymatiidae Iredale, 1913
- Subfamily Ranellinae Gray, 1854: synonym of Ranellidae Gray, 1854
- Dissentoma Pilsbry, 1945: synonym of Monoplex Perry, 1810 (junior subjective synonym)
- Eugyrina Dall, 1904: synonym of Ranella Lamarck, 1816
- Gyrina Schumacher, 1817: synonym of Ranella Lamarck, 1816
- † Gyrinopsis Dall, 1925: synonym of Ranella Lamarck, 1816 (invalid: junior homonym of Gyrinopsis Handlirsch, 1906 [Coleoptera])
- Liohindsia Coen, 1947: synonym of Priene H. Adams & A. Adams, 1858
- Mayena Iredale, 1917: synonym of Ranella Lamarck, 1816
- † Mediargo Terry, 1968: synonym of Argobuccinum Herrmannsen, 1846
