= Registry of World Record Size Shells =

Conchological record book

- First edition cover featuring a pen-and-ink illustration of Chicoreus eversoni by malacologist Anthony D'Attilio (Note: Similar muricid artwork by Anthony D'Attilio (1909–1997) also features on the covers of the second and third editions (depicting Babelomurex santacruzensis and Typhisala grandis, respectively). The cover of the fourth edition carries a drawing of Gyrineum pulchellum (Cymatiidae) by Mattheus Marinus Schepman (1847–1919) in a similar style. The fifth edition again shows a muricid by D'Attilio (Monstrotyphis tosaensis) and this cover illustration has been retained for all subsequent editions. This last drawing was based on a specimen provided by conchologist Robert Janowsky, who in turn received the original work by D'Attilio as a gift in exchange for the shell.)
- Author: Kim C. Hutsell, Linda L. Hutsell & Donald L. Pisor (editions 1–3); Donald L. Pisor (editions 4–5); Jean-Pierre Barbier, Philippe Quiquandon & Olivier Santini (editions 6–11); Philippe Quiquandon, Jean-Pierre Barbier & Adeline Brunella (edition 12–present)
- Language: English (online database also in French)
- Publisher: Snail's Pace Productions (editions 1–3); ConchBooks (editions 4–5); Shell's Passion & Topseashells (edition 6–present)
- Publication date: 1997–present
- Media type: Print (softcover); Online database
- Pages: See text

The Registry of World Record Size Shells is a conchological work listing the largest (and in some cases smallest) verified shell specimens of various marine molluscan taxa.

A successor to the Lost Operculum Club List of Champions (1950–1987) and World Size Records (1964–1990), it has been published on a semi-regular basis since 1997, changing ownership and publisher a number of times. Originally planned for release every two years, new editions are now published annually. Since 2008 the entire registry has been available online in the form of a searchable database. The registry is continuously expanded and now contains more than 52,000 listings and 93,000 supporting images.

== Background ==
World record size shells—commonly indicated by the acronym 'WRS'—are of broad interest to shell collectors and conchologists. In particular, those of species in the most popular families (such as cones or cowries) are often much sought after, and can thus command high prices. (Note: The value of some WRS shells can exceed US$10,000. Already in 1985 prices of WRS shells were five to ten times those of normal specimens of the same species. Even when compared to already "large" specimens, WRS status often confers a premium amounting to a multiple of the normal price, and this is particularly pronounced in historically prized species such as Conus gloriamaris.) Collections of such shells are exhibited at a number of specialist museums, notably the Bailey-Matthews National Shell Museum (of which R. Tucker Abbott was the Founding Director), which has a dedicated "World Record Size Shells" exhibit. Since volume scales with the cube of length, apparently small differences in stated size—in terms of greatest measurable dimension, usually given in mm—can correspond to dramatic differences in the visual appearance of size, something that is often underappreciated by novice collectors.

Maximum and minimum sizes are also of interest to malacologists, and may be useful in delimiting closely related species. As an extensive compilation of maximum shell sizes, the registry has found use as a data source for scientific studies. (Note: See for example the study of Estes, Lindberg & Wray (2005) into large body size in abalones (genus Haliotis) or that of Pedro, Cavallari & Simone (2021) into the maximum size of Stramonita brasiliensis and its congeners from the western Atlantic.)

== Overview ==
=== Scope ===
Throughout its history the registry has covered four classes of molluscs: bivalves, cephalopods, gastropods, and scaphopods. Chitons have been excluded because their shells are formed from eight articulated plates and therefore the size of a fixed specimen depends in large part on the preservation method used.

Smallest adult sizes have been listed beginning with a few specimens of Cypraeidae and Strombidae in the first edition, and they now additionally encompass a third family: Marginellidae. Separate records for sinistral (left-handed) shells and obviously rostrate cowries (family Cypraeidae) are also included. Terrestrial and freshwater species, as well as fossils (of extant taxa or otherwise), are not covered by the registry.

=== Content ===
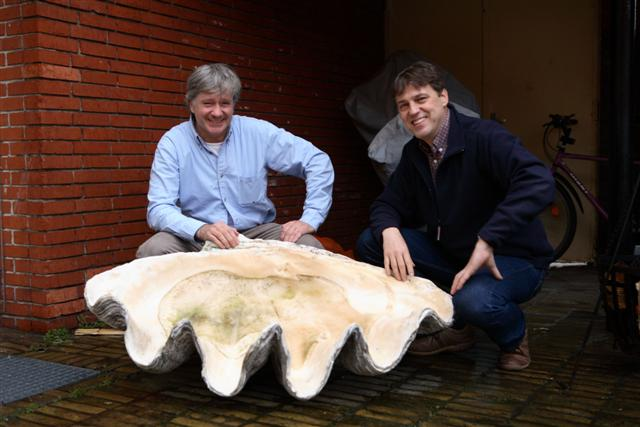
A single valve of Tridacna gigas, the largest extant bivalve in terms of mass, and the second-longest species listed in the registry (the WRS shell measuring 1368.7 mm)

The bulk of the publication—which apart from the cover is unillustrated—comprises a list of taxa and their corresponding world record sizes. Each specimen in the registry is listed alphabetically under its recognised scientific name. This is usually a binomen (species name), but subspecies, varieties and forms are also included (the latter two are used informally and are not regulated by the ICZN). In addition to the shell size, each specimen is listed with its location, owner or repository, and the year it was collected, acquired, or registered (whichever is known, listed in decreasing order of preference).

Each print edition has an appendix with an alphabetical listing of entry totals for all private collectors and repositories having ownership of specimens in the registry. In the first edition, the most individual entries belonged to Victor Dan, with 369, closely followed by co-author Don Pisor on 325. (Note: 409 of Pisor's then-WRS shells were figured in the 2015 book Sea and Land Shells of the Don Pisor Collection.) This title subsequently went to Tennessee physician and world-renowned collector Pete Stimpson, who for a time held over 2,000 entries in the registry, and whose WRS specimens have been exhibited at museums including the McClung Museum of Natural History and Culture. As of the fifth print edition from 2008, the distinction of having the most WRS entries belonged to Havelet Marine, with 3,244 specimens, compared to Stimpson's 1,963.

=== Measurements ===
The registry's rules specify that specimens "should be measured with vernier type calipers and should reflect the greatest measurable dimension of the shell in any direction including any processes of hard shell material produced by the animal (i.e. spines, wings, keels, siphonal canals, etc.) and not including attachments, barnacles, coralline algae, or any other encrusting organisms. Long, hair-like periostracum is not to be included." This "greatest measurable dimension" can be at odds with the standard scientific definition of shell length (from base to apex along the central axis for gastropods, and from the umbo to the ventral margin in bivalves).

Shell sizes are given in millimetres and recorded to the nearest 0.1 millimetres (0.0039 in), as is standard in conchology. To account for human error and environmental effects, new records are only accepted if they exceed the standing record by at least 0.3 mm (0.012 in). This 0.3 mm margin also applies to smallest adult sizes exceeding 10.0 mm (0.39 in).

Entries for specimens that tie the standing record can also be submitted. Though not included in the registry, they are kept on file for future use in the event that the current record holder is shown to be misidentified or smaller than originally claimed.

==== Superlative species ====
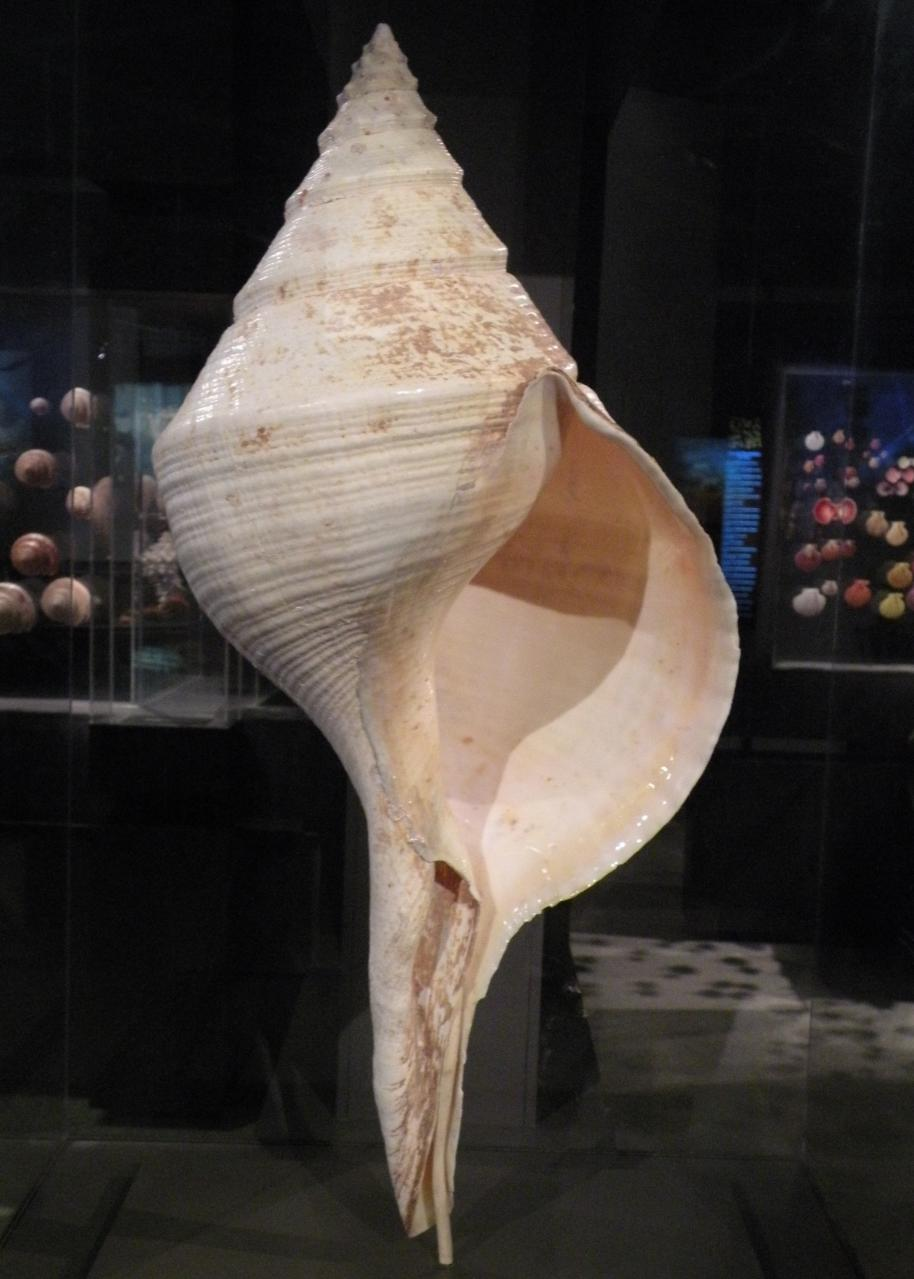
World record size specimen of Syrinx aruanus (772 mm), the largest extant gastropod and fourth-longest species listed in the registry, on display at the Houston Museum of Natural Science (photographed in 2009)

The three largest species in the registry are the bivalves Kuphus polythalamia, Tridacna gigas and Pinna nobilis, with maximum recorded shell sizes of 1,532.0 mm (5 ft 0.31 in), 1,368.7 mm (4 ft 5.89 in) and 970.0 mm (3 ft 2.19 in), respectively. The fourth largest species, and the largest of all gastropods, is Syrinx aruanus with a maximum length of 772.0 mm (2 ft 6.39 in). There are literature records of an even larger S. aruanus specimen measuring 36 inches (914 mm), but these are erroneous and actually refer to the same specimen, which is on display at the Houston Museum of Natural Science. (Note: McClain et al. (2015) mentioned a supposedly slightly larger (but unconfirmed) record based on a shell sold at auction that was claimed to measure some 72.4 cm (2 ft 4.5 in), but they misquoted the size of the official WRS specimen as 72.2 cm (2 ft 4.4 in) instead of the correct 77.2 cm (2 ft 6.4 in). The authors also wrote: "A number of websites claim the existence of a specimen that measured one meter long, but we were unable to confirm this claim.") The extinct gastropod Campanile giganteum reached a similar or slightly greater size, while the largest extinct bivalves and especially the largest extinct shelled cephalopods were much larger still (and the internal shells of the largest extant squid species also reach much greater lengths, as they approximate the mantle length). However, only external shells (with some exceptions, e.g. Spirula spirula) of extant species are covered by the registry. The largest listed cephalopod "shell" is that of Argonauta argo, at 300.0 mm (11.81 in), though this is technically an eggcase rather than a true molluscan shell.

List of species with a world record size of ≥300 mm in the fifth (2008) edition of the registry
Species^{†}	Family^{†}	Class	World record size (mm)
Kuphus polythalamia	Teredinidae	Bivalvia	1532.0^{‡}
Tridacna gigas	Cardiidae	Bivalvia	1368.7^{‡}
Pinna nobilis	Pinnidae	Bivalvia	970.0
Syrinx aruanus	Melongenidae	Gastropoda	772.0
Tridacna derasa	Cardiidae	Bivalvia	621.0
Pleuroploca gigantea	Fasciolariidae	Gastropoda	616.0
Pinna rugosa	Pinnidae	Bivalvia	590.0
Melo amphora	Volutidae	Gastropoda	550.0
Pinna bicolor	Pinnidae	Bivalvia	550.0
Turbinella angulata	Turbinellidae	Gastropoda	496.0
Adelomelon beckii	Volutidae	Gastropoda	494.5
Charonia tritonis	Ranellidae	Gastropoda	490.0
Tridacna squamosa	Cardiidae	Bivalvia	476.0
Siliquaria ponderosa	Siliquariidae	Gastropoda	467.0
Hippopus porcellanus	Cardiidae	Bivalvia	463.0
Serpulorbis medusae	Vermetidae	Gastropoda	460.0
Melo miltonis	Volutidae	Gastropoda	455.0
Melo umbilicatus	Volutidae	Gastropoda	450.0
Atrina vexillum	Pinnidae	Bivalvia	445.0
Brechites giganteus	Clavagellidae	Bivalvia	437.5
Hippopus hippopus	Cardiidae	Bivalvia	435.0
Atrina vexillum	Pinnidae	Bivalvia	432.0
Tutufa bardeyi	Bursidae	Gastropoda	427.0
Pleuroploca gigantea reevei	Fasciolariidae	Gastropoda	426.0
Hemifusus colosseus	Melongenidae	Gastropoda	423.0
Atrina maura	Pinnidae	Bivalvia	422.0
Pinna rudis	Pinnidae	Bivalvia	421.0
Atrina pectinata	Pinnidae	Bivalvia	420.0
Lambis truncata	Strombidae	Gastropoda	419.0
Hemifusus tuba	Melongenidae	Gastropoda	418.9
Turbinella laffertyi	Turbinellidae	Gastropoda	418.9
Livonia nodiplicata	Volutidae	Gastropoda	415.0
Busycon sinistrum	Melongenidae	Gastropoda	413.5
Hemifusus crassicaudus	Melongenidae	Gastropoda	410.0
Cassis cornuta	Cassidae	Gastropoda	410.0
Cassis madagascariensis spinela	Cassidae	Gastropoda	409.6
Pleuroploca princeps	Fasciolariidae	Gastropoda	404.0
Turbinella scolymoides	Turbinellidae	Gastropoda	404.0
Melo broderipii	Volutidae	Gastropoda	402.5
Charonia lampas	Ranellidae	Gastropoda	395.5
Pinna carnea	Pinnidae	Bivalvia	395.0
Charonia tritonis variegata	Ranellidae	Gastropoda	385.0
Cymbium glans	Volutidae	Gastropoda	385.0
Adelomelon riosi	Volutidae	Gastropoda	382.0
Strombus goliath	Strombidae	Gastropoda	380.0
Melo melo	Volutidae	Gastropoda	378.0
Livonia mammilla	Volutidae	Gastropoda	372.0
Fusinus caparti	Fasciolariidae	Gastropoda	370.0
Melo aethiopica	Volutidae	Gastropoda	370.0
Melo georginae	Volutidae	Gastropoda	363.0
Cymbiola magnifica	Volutidae	Gastropoda	361.0
Pinctada maxima	Pteriidae	Bivalvia	359.3
Crassostrea gigas	Ostreidae	Bivalvia	357.0
Lambis truncata sebae	Strombidae	Gastropoda	355.0
Strombus gigas	Strombidae	Gastropoda	352.4
Magilus antiquus	Coralliophilidae	Gastropoda	347.0
Crassostrea gigas laperousii	Ostreidae	Bivalvia	344.0
Fusinus forceps	Fasciolariidae	Gastropoda	344.0
Pinna incurva	Pinnidae	Bivalvia	344.0
Chicoreus ramosus	Muricidae	Gastropoda	342.0
Lambis chiragra	Strombidae	Gastropoda	342.0
Atrina rigida	Pinnidae	Bivalvia	340.0
Fusinus longissimus	Fasciolariidae	Gastropoda	340.0
Tutufa bubo	Bursidae	Gastropoda	337.0
Turbinella pyrum	Turbinellidae	Gastropoda	335.0
Tibia fusus	Strombidae	Gastropoda	329.0
Tridacna maxima	Cardiidae	Bivalvia	329.5
Spondylus varius	Spondylidae	Bivalvia	323.3
Charonia weisbordi	Ranellidae	Gastropoda	323.0
Charonia lampas sauliae	Ranellidae	Gastropoda	322.0
Pteria penguin	Pteriidae	Bivalvia	322.0
Tenagodus obtusus	Siliquariidae	Gastropoda	321.0
Cymbium tritonis	Volutidae	Gastropoda	319.5
Cymbiola imperialis robinsona	Volutidae	Gastropoda	316.0
Tonna galea	Tonnidae	Gastropoda	315.0
Fusinus undatus	Fasciolariidae	Gastropoda	314.0
Malleus albus	Malleidae	Bivalvia	314.0
Haliotis rufescens	Haliotidae	Gastropoda	313.0
Cassis tessellata	Cassidae	Gastropoda	312.0
Cymbium senegalensis	Volutidae	Gastropoda	311.0
Atrina serrata	Pinnidae	Bivalvia	310.0
Brechites veitchi	Clavagellidae	Bivalvia	310.0
Adelomelon simulatrix	Volutidae	Gastropoda	307.0
Tonna melanostoma	Tonnidae	Gastropoda	307.0
Tonna olearium	Tonnidae	Gastropoda	307.0
Pinna muricata	Pinnidae	Bivalvia	305.0
Charonia lampas rubicunda	Ranellidae	Gastropoda	300.9
Cassis tuberosa	Cassidae	Gastropoda	300.8
Argonauta argo	Argonautidae	Cephalopoda	300.0
† Binomial names and families are those given in the fifth edition of the registry, published in 2008; they may not agree with more recent classifications. ‡ The world record sizes for both of these species are listed, without explanation, as "?" in the fourth and fifth editions; the sizes provided are taken from the third edition, published in 2001.

Adult external shells down to 0.4 mm (0.016 in) are known (Ammonicera minortalis), as are fully-grown larval shells as small as 0.2 mm (0.0079 in) (Paedoclione doliiformis). But the smallest end-stage "shells" of all, broadly defined, are likely to be vestigial internal gastropod shells, which could be almost arbitrarily small, perhaps consisting of only a few molecules.

=== Size verification ===
For inclusion in the registry, size records must be verified either by a recognised second party ("a professional malacologist, a reputable shell dealer, or an advanced collector who is recognized as a specialist in the applicable family") or through photographic evidence (three images, showing the shell being measured with calipers and its dorsal and ventral aspects). Entries may be submitted by regular mail or e-mail; a submission form is included at the back of each print edition. These requirements mean that in some cases older or even current malacological literature may include size records which exceed those found in the registry.

In the early years of the registry, shells were sometimes officially measured for world record size status at Conchologists of America conventions, as in 1999 when the measurements were carried out by senior author Kim Hutsell.

== History ==
=== Progenitors ===
==== Lost Operculum Club List of Champions (1950–1987) ====
Beginning in the mid–20th century, several attempts were made to produce a list of the largest shell specimens. Perhaps the earliest of these was what would eventually become known as the Lost Operculum Club List of Champions, initiated in 1950 by John Q. Burch (1894–1974) and Dick Mayhew of the Los Angeles–based Conchological Club of Southern California (CCSC). (Note: Tracing its origins to 1902, the Conchological Club of Southern California (originally known as 'The Tuesday Shell Club' and later the 'Conchological Club of Los Angeles County') is the oldest shell club in the United States. In 2003 (or 2005), it merged with the Pacific Shell Club to form the Pacific Conchological Club.) Though started as something of a "joke", it soon evolved into a serious endeavour. Its first list, featuring 20 entries, appeared in the January 1950 issue of the Minutes of the Conchological Club of Southern California, opening as follows:

Have you ever noticed that when you go to the shell club meeting with a large specimen to show, someone always comes up claiming a larger one at home? So to settle some of the arguments as to who has the largest shell, we are starting a competition. No slogans to write, no box tops to send, just measurements.

In other words we are after the Paul Bunyon [sic] of each species represented on the West Coast from Alaska to Panama. To interest everybody, we are including land, fresh water and fossil shells, as well as the marine varieties.

Judging from some of the stories we hear, the measurememnts are made on the scales used by fishermen telling about the one that got away, or on a scale with more than 25.4 mm to the inch.

From the outset, the competition was said to have "created a great deal of interest"; entries for 54 species had already been submitted by the printing of the second list in February 1950. Then known simply as "The Society of the Lost Operculum", a new compilation of records appeared every month until the June 1950 issue, during which time some 150 shells belonging to nearly 125 species were registered. However, with the exception of a small number of specimens submitted by Walter J. Eyerdam for the January 1951 issue, no further updates were published and the project soon became inactive.

During a meeting of the CCSC on 6 January 1959, it was decided that the list would be revived, following a query from then-President Donald Shasky (1925–2002). Shasky volunteered to handle records pertaining to specimens collected south of Cedros Island, Baja California; it was only at the following month's meeting that a volunteer—George Kanakoff (1897–1973)—was found for the northern taxa. At subsequent meetings, shells were routinely entered for competition, measured, and displayed for club members; mimeographed copies of the list were also occasionally distributed, showing strong demand. A compilation of all "southern" specimens printed during the list's original run in 1950 appeared—with updated nomenclature—in the March 1959 issue; a complete and up-to-date list was published in the July–August 1959 issue, running to 7 pages. The revival was short-lived, however, as the Minutes soon ceased publication, the 200th and final issue appearing in June 1960.

Between 1966 and 1987, the project was again resurrected, this time being overseen by Bertram C. Draper (1904–2000), Museum Associate at the Natural History Museum of Los Angeles County, a member of the CCSC since 1961, and a specialist in minute shells; it bore at least five standalone print publications during this time. Overall, the Lost Operculum Club List of Champions was limited in scope compared to later efforts, ultimately encompassing only marine species of the Eastern Pacific, from Alaska to Chile. Unlike later publications it notably included a small number of fossil specimens.

==== World Size Records (1964–1990) ====
The direct predecessor to the Registry of World Record Size Shells was World Size Records, compiled by renowned malacologists Robert J. L. Wagner (1905–1992) and R. Tucker Abbott (1919–1995). These record sizes originally appeared in 1964, in the first edition of Van Nostrand's Standard Catalog of Shells, not as a separate list but interspersed among other species-specific information that made up the bulk of the work. An updated list—now with a section unto itself and running to eight pages—was published as part of the book's second edition, in 1967. Though not stated as such, records from 1950 to 1959 were taken from lists in the Minutes of the Conchological Club of Southern California and included outdated information, including long-deceased owners.

The next update appeared in the work's third edition, which was renamed Wagner and Abbott's Standard Catalog of Shells. Unlike previous editions, this third and final installment of the catalog was a ring binder with loose-leaf content, intended as a continually updated resource. To match the newly retitled work, the list's name was modified to Wagner and Abbott's World Size Records. In this final incarnation, the list appeared as a series of four supplements: the first two were loose-leaf publications that appeared in 1978 and 1982, and these were followed by hole-punched paperback titles in 1985 and 1990. The records were to be maintained "by a special committee of editors through which accurate measurements and correct identifications are verified by knowledgeable conchologists".

The third supplement, published in 1985, encompassed shells from 21 museums and more than 300 private collections, with the authors of the opinion that "many new records lurk in museums where scientists do not have the time or inclination to measure largest specimens". At the time, the American Museum of Natural History officially held the most record specimens, followed by the British Museum (Natural History) (London's Natural History Museum) and the Natural History Museum of Los Angeles County.

The much-expanded fourth supplement, published in 1990, incorporated many records from the final (1987) edition of the Lost Operculum Club List of Champions. It also lowered the minimum shell size to one inch (2.54 cm) from the previous 4.00 cm (except for Cypraea, which did not have a lower limit). Carole Hertz, long-time editor of The Festivus, noted that "a few" records were outdated upon publication as they listed deceased shell owners. Wagner died in 1992 and, though it was announced the following year that World Size Records would continue to be published, no further supplements were completed before Abbott's death in 1995.

=== Registry of World Record Size Shells (1997–present) ===
Following the deaths of Wagner and Abbott, Barbara Haviland continued to compile data for world records. In 1997 Kim C. Hutsell acquired the rights to World Size Records from Abbott's daughter, Cynthia, to continue the project as a stand-alone book; those rights were subsequently sold to Don L. Pisor. The first edition of the Registry of World Record Size Shells therefore incorporated many of the earlier entries, as well as additional data compiled for World Size Records by Haviland. The format of the new publication differed from World Size Records in several important ways. Significantly, the minimum size threshold was lowered from 2.5 centimetres (0.98 in) to 1 centimetre (0.39 in). In another change, the registry listed taxa alphabetically by species name within families, instead of within genera as they had been previously. (Note: This format would later be dropped for the fourth edition (2005) in favour of alphabetical ordering of species within genera and of genera within families, only to be reinstated for the fifth edition (2008).) This system allows for easy comparison between closely related genera, is more resilient to the frequent taxonomic changes that occur at the genus level, and gets around the issue that many shell dealers prefer to lump numerous genera for the sake of simplicity. R. Tucker Abbott had himself intended to use this arrangement in the fifth edition of his World Size Records, but died before he could see his plans through. Another difference was the presentation of sizes in millimetres to the nearest tenth instead of centimetres to the nearest hundredth, moving the publication in line with standard usage in conchology. Finally, references were added for each specimen to aid in identification. The opening paragraph of the first edition set out the project's goals and invited submissions:

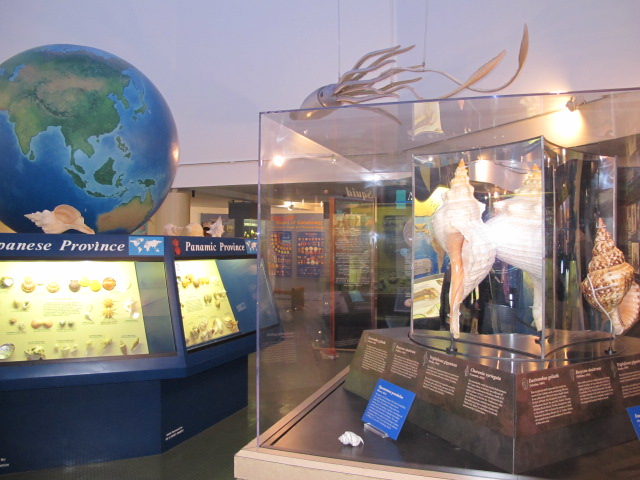
Exhibit of official world record size shells (right) at the Bailey-Matthews National Shell Museum, Sanibel, Florida, consisting of: 604 mm Triplofusus giganteus (visible at left), 402 mm Sinistrofulgur sinistrum, 387.5 mm Charonia variegata (visible at right), 380 mm Lobatus goliath, and 129 mm Cinctura hunteria (photographed in 2014)

While the importance of maximum shell size and its role in the overall scheme of Conchology and Malacology is debatable, it remains one point of continual interest among collectors and researchers. The purpose of the Registry of World Record Size Shells is to provide a single publication containing a list of the largest known specimens for as many shelled molluscan species as possible in a format designed for ease of use. Undoubtedly, specimens may exist, hidden in museums, universities and private collections, which exceed some of the sizes listed herein. It is the sincere hope of the editors that information concerning such specimens be shared with others by submitting accurate and verifiable records to the Registry of World Record Size Shells. (Note: The largest shell specimens are often housed in museums, but such institutions can rarely commit significant resources towards mensuration, and for this reason most records pertaining to museum specimens that appeared in the early editions of the registry were collated by volunteers.)

Kim C. Hutsell, Linda L. Hutsell and Don L. Pisor released the first three editions in 1997, 1999, and 2001. These were published by the Hutsells' company, Snail's Pace Productions, and distributed by Pisor's Marine Shells, both based in San Diego, California. The first edition went on sale at the 1997 Conchologists of America (COA) convention in Captiva Island, Florida. Originally called Hutsell & Pisor's Registry of World Record Size Shells, for the third edition the title was modified slightly to Hutsell, Hutsell and Pisor's Registry of World Record Size Shells (as given on the respective title pages).

The text of the fourth edition was completed by Kim and Linda Hutsell and originally planned for release at the 2003 COA convention in Tacoma, Washington, but was greatly delayed and only came out in 2005. The fifth edition appeared three years later. With the departure of the first two authors, the titles of the fourth and fifth editions were shortened to Pisor's Registry of World Record Size Shells (as given on the title pages). These also marked a switch from Snail's Pace Productions to a new main publisher, ConchBooks of Hackenheim, Germany. (Note: The fourth edition (2005) is identified on its front cover as "A Publication of Snail's Pace Productions and ConchBooks". Its title page gives Pisor as the author, Conchology, Inc. as the compiler, and ConchBooks as the editor. The fifth edition (2008) has "A Publication of ConchBooks and Pisor Marine Enterprise, Inc." on the cover, with the title page listing Pisor as the author, Conchology, Inc. as the compiler, both ConchBooks and Pisor Marine Enterprise as the editors, and crediting Guido T. Poppe for reworking the book.) They were compiled with the help of Conchology, Inc., with the company's founder, Guido T. Poppe, providing an introduction for the fifth edition.

On 2 April 2008, the copyrights to the registry were transferred from Pisor to Jean-Pierre Barbier of Topseashells and Philippe Quiquandon of Shell's Passion. With Olivier Santini, Barbier and Quiquandon subsequently launched an official website where all registry listings can be accessed for a fee. The online database includes photographs of the listed specimens that have been gathered with the help of collectors, dealers, and institutions such as the Muséum national d'Histoire naturelle in Paris. Older records for which photographic evidence could not be obtained were removed from the database and replaced by verified specimens, even if these were smaller, to ensure that all specimens were measured and identified correctly. Barbier, Quiquandon and Santini moved the print title to an annual publication cycle, starting with the sixth edition in 2009, with Shell's Passion and Topseashells taking over as publishers. Under the new ownership the print edition was titled simply Registry of World Record Size Shells. The number of listings increased rapidly during the first few years, from just over 12,200 in 2009 to more than 17,000 in 2011. It was announced that the fifteenth print edition (2018) would be the last single-volume work, owing to the publication's increasingly unwieldy size; the first two-volume edition appeared the following year, spanning around 750 pages. The two volumes of the seventeenth edition (2020) weigh some 2.5 kg (5.5 lb).

=== List of publications ===
Supplement 4, the final and by far the most comprehensive incarnation of Wagner and Abbott's World Size Records, published as a self-contained paperback title in 1990

The Lost Operculum Club List of Champions originally appeared as "The Society of the Lost Operculum" in the Minutes of the Conchological Club of Southern California, initially in January–June 1950 and January 1951, (Note: John Q. Burch was the then-editor of the Minutes of the Conchological Club of Southern California; though unattributed, the early lists of "The Society of the Lost Operculum" (January–June 1950 and January 1951) were authored by him.) and then, following a brief revival, in March and July–August 1959. Following another revival, from 1968 additions to the list were published in The Echo, the journal of the San Diego–based Western Society of Malacologists. The list was printed in full in four standalone editions between 1969 and 1987; at least one supplement also appeared during this time. The second (1973) edition was subtitled "Marine shells of the eastern Pacific, Alaska to Peru" and the third (1980) and fourth (1987) editions were subtitled "Marine shells of the eastern Pacific, Alaska to Chile", reflecting a southward extension in geographical scope.

- First edition (May 1969). B.C. Draper. Conchological Club of Southern California. 44 pp.
- Second edition (April 1973). B.C. Draper. Conchological Club of Southern California. 64 pp. & 4 unnumbered figs. OCLC 456652651
- Supplement (1975). B.C. Draper. Conchological Club of Southern California. 13 pp.
- Third edition (May 1980). B.C. Draper. Conchological Club of Southern California. 32 pp. OCLC 143491787
- Fourth edition (June 1987). B.C. Draper. Conchological Club of Southern California. 44 pp. & 4 unnumbered figs. OCLC 40531677

World Size Records originally appeared in the first and second editions of the Standard Catalog of Shells in 1964 and 1967, and then as four supplements to the third edition (one of which was titled a revision) between 1978 and 1990. A list of new entries—submitted for inclusion in World Size Records as of November 1987—appeared across the 1988 and 1989 issues of Hawaiian Shell News and also in American Conchologist.

- First edition (December 1964). [records interspersed among other information in Van Nostrand's Standard Catalog of Shells, 1st edition; R.J.L. Wagner & R.T. Abbott (eds.). Van Nostrand. ix + 190 pp. OCLC 1306235.]
- Second edition (September 1967). [8 pp. in Van Nostrand's Standard Catalog of Shells, 2nd edition; R.J.L. Wagner & R.T. Abbott (eds.). Van Nostrand. 303 pp. OCLC 318015256.]
- Supplement 1 (September 1978). [part of Wagner and Abbott's Standard Catalog of Shells, 3rd edition with supplements (February 1978 onwards); R.J.L. Wagner & R.T. Abbott. American Malacologists. 700+ pp. ISBN 0915826038. OCLC 727857925.]
- Revision 1 (October 1982). R.J.L. Wagner & R.T. Abbott. American Malacologists. 25 pp.
- Supplement 3 (January 1985). R.J.L. Wagner & R.T. Abbott. American Malacologists. 30 pp. ~1,200 listings. [content actually dated February 1985]
- Supplement 4 (September 1990). R.J.L. Wagner & R.T. Abbott. American Malacologists. ii + 80 pp. OCLC 47902507. 2,318 listings. [content actually dated 27 April 1990]

Fifteenth and final single-volume print edition of the Registry of World Record Size Shells (2018). The pen-and-ink drawing of Monstrotyphis tosaensis by Anthony D'Attilio has been used as the cover artwork since the fifth edition in 2008.

The Registry of World Record Size Shells has appeared in seventeen print editions since 1997. From the fifth (2008) edition onwards, new editions have been released on an annual basis. All editions are of the approximate dimensions 8.5 by 11 inches (22 cm × 28 cm), with heavy paper covers and a clear plastic sheet protecting the front cover. The first three editions have coil binding and subsequent editions comb binding.

- First edition (June 1997). K.C. Hutsell, L.L. Hutsell & D.L. Pisor. Snail's Pace Productions. ii + 101 pp. ISBN 0965901718. OCLC 40486364. 4,470+ listings.
- Second edition (June 1999). K.C. Hutsell, L.L. Hutsell & D.L. Pisor. Snail's Pace Productions. vii + 131 pp. ISBN 0965901726. OCLC 174637035. 6,100+ listings.
- Third edition (June 2001). K.C. Hutsell, L.L. Hutsell & D.L. Pisor. Snail's Pace Productions. vii + 158 pp. ISBN 0965901734. OCLC 183130294. 7,100+ listings.
- Fourth edition (March 2005). D.L. Pisor. ConchBooks. 171 pp. ISBN 0965901742. OCLC 76736724. 9,500+ listings.
- Fifth edition (March 2008). D.L. Pisor (with introduction by G.T. Poppe; 6 pp.). ConchBooks. 207 pp. ISBN 0615194753. OCLC 227336824. 11,500+ listings.
- Sixth edition (2009). J.-P. Barbier, P. Quiquandon & O. Santini. Shell's Passion & Topseashells. 304 pp. ISBN 2746606836. OCLC 495193919. 12,200+ listings.
- Seventh edition (2010). J.-P. Barbier, P. Quiquandon & O. Santini. Shell's Passion & Topseashells.
- Eighth edition (2011). J.-P. Barbier, P. Quiquandon & O. Santini. Shell's Passion & Topseashells. Unpaginated. OCLC 800559734. 17,000+ listings.
- Ninth edition (2012). J.-P. Barbier, P. Quiquandon & O. Santini. Shell's Passion & Topseashells. Unpaginated. 17,300+ listings.
- Tenth edition (2013). J.-P. Barbier, P. Quiquandon & O. Santini. Shell's Passion & Topseashells. Unpaginated. OCLC 971890560. 18,000+ listings.
- Eleventh edition (2014). J.-P. Barbier, P. Quiquandon & O. Santini. Shell's Passion & Topseashells. Unpaginated. OCLC 971890566. 18,400+ listings.
- Twelfth edition (2015). P. Quiquandon, J.-P. Barbier & A. Brunella. Shell's Passion & Topseashells. Unpaginated. OCLC 971890438. 19,600+ listings.
- Thirteenth edition (2016). P. Quiquandon, J.-P. Barbier & A. Brunella. Shell's Passion & Topseashells. Unpaginated. OCLC 971890446. 20,800+ listings.
- Fourteenth edition (2017). P. Quiquandon, J.-P. Barbier & A. Brunella. Shell's Passion & Topseashells. Unpaginated. OCLC 1002074760. 21,560+ listings.
- Fifteenth edition (2018). P. Quiquandon, J.-P. Barbier & A. Brunella. Shell's Passion & Topseashells. Unpaginated. OCLC 1031380206. 22,600+ listings.
- Sixteenth edition [2 volumes] (2019). Tome 1: Abyssochrysidae–Modulidae; Tome 2: Montacutidae–Yoldiidae. P. Quiquandon, J.-P. Barbier & A. Brunella. Shell's Passion & Topseashells. 749 pp. 23,500+ listings.
- Seventeenth edition [2 volumes] (2020). Tome 1: Abyssochrysidae–Modulidae; Tome 2: Montacutidae–Yoldiidae. P. Quiquandon, J.-P. Barbier & A. Brunella. Shell's Passion & Topseashells. c. 700 pp. 24,200+ listings.

== Reception ==
=== First edition ===
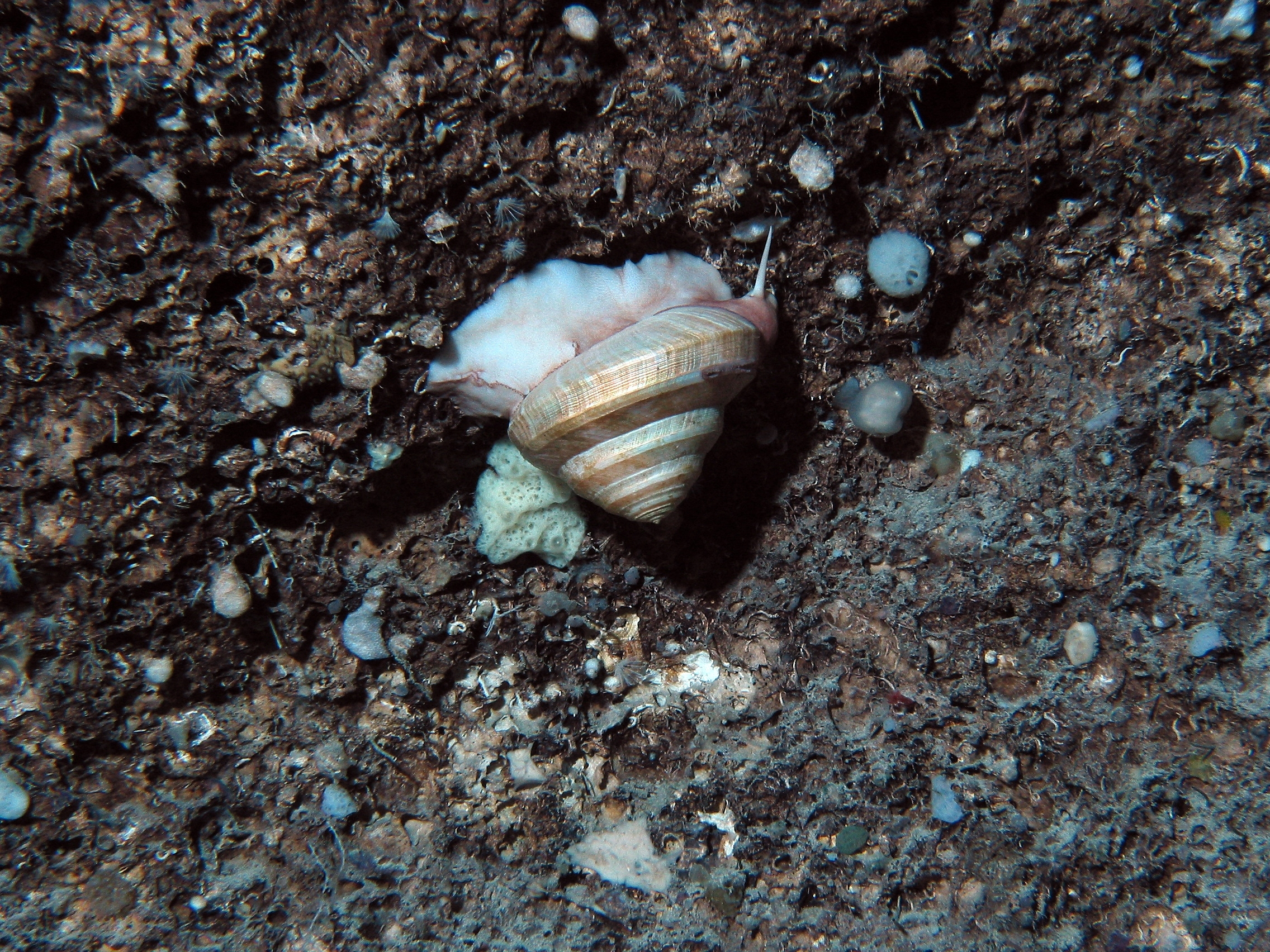
The first edition of the registry gave the WRS of Bayerotrochus midas (pictured)—listed under its basionym Perotrochus midas—as 77.4 mm, when the type specimen itself was considerably larger at 118.3 mm.

The first edition of the Registry of World Record Size Shells was reviewed for American Conchologist by malacologist Gary Rosenberg of the Academy of Natural Sciences of Philadelphia and conchologist Gene Everson.

Rosenberg spoke favourably of the changes made since World Size Records, namely the lowering of the minimum size for inclusion, listing sizes in millimetres, ordering species alphabetically within families irrespective of genus, and adding a reference field for identification purposes. He also welcomed the inclusion of separate entries for infraspecific taxa such as subspecies, varieties, and forms, noting that these "might someday prove to be full species, and maximum sizes might provide evidence as to their status".

Rosenberg identified a minor inconsistency in the grouping of cephalopods (Argonautidae and Nautilidae) and scaphopods (Dentaliidae) with gastropods while listing bivalves separately, opining that "a single alphabetic sequence would be preferable". Rosenberg also found "an unusual number of typographical errors", which he attributed to a rush to have the work ready for the 1997 COA convention. Other issues identified by Rosenberg included the listing of synonyms (e.g. Oliva sericea and its junior synonym Oliva textilina) and different combinations of the same species (e.g. Ancilla lienardi and Eburna lienardii). While suggesting that errors of the second type would be easier to catch if author citations were included, Rosenberg conceded that this might not be practical due to space limitations. Rosenberg also noted entries where the cited location fell well outside the species's natural range (e.g. a supposed West African specimen of the East African Ancilla ventricosa).

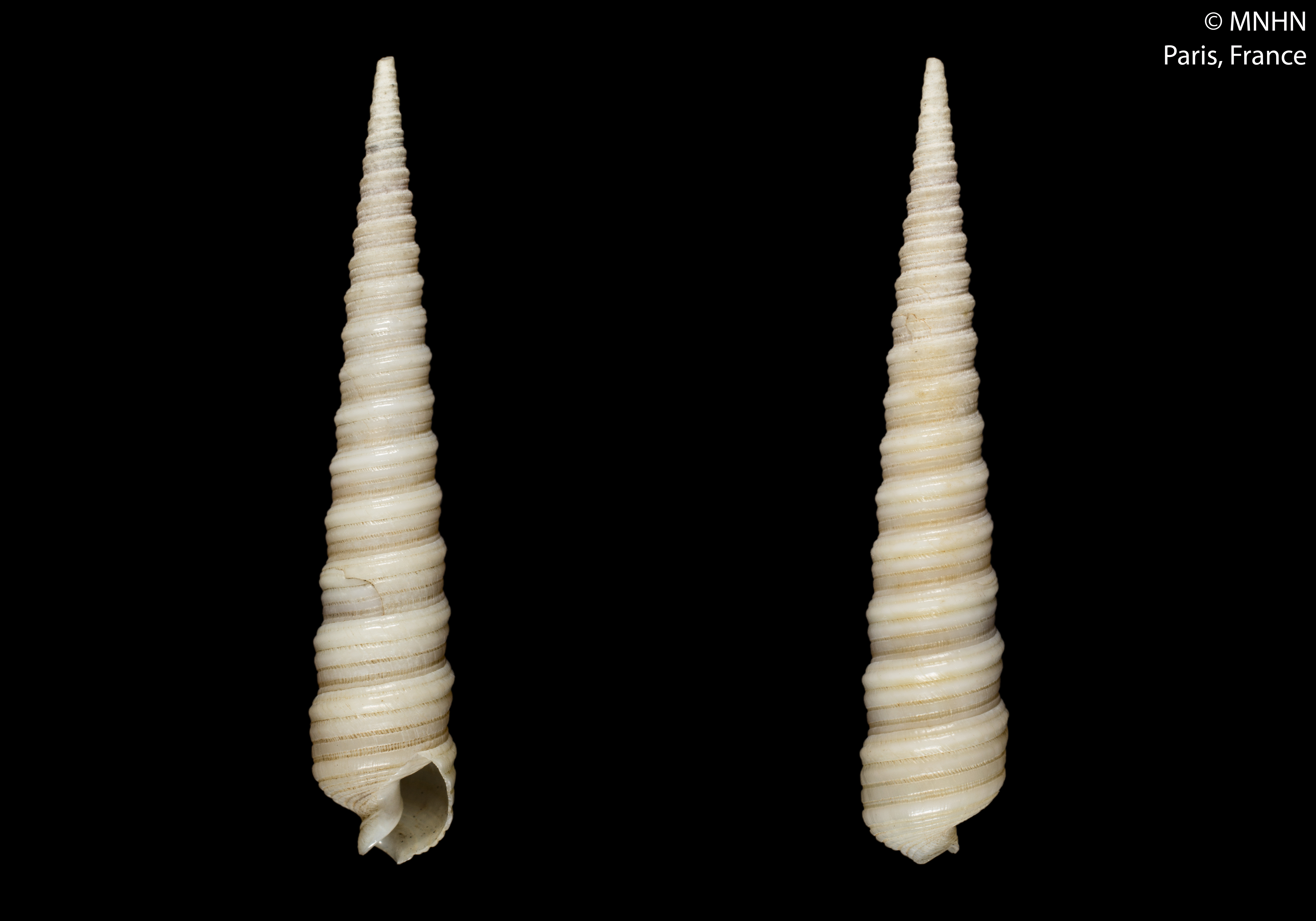
Holotype of Terebra funiculata, deposited at the MNHN; the first edition of the registry gave a 32.5 mm record for this species—less than half the 69 mm maximum recorded in the scholarly literature

Comparing around a quarter of the size records from the first edition against shells in the collections of the Academy of Natural Sciences of Philadelphia, Rosenberg found that the latter had larger specimens in some 10% of cases. What Rosenberg considered "[o]f greatest concern", however, were discrepancies between the record sizes listed in the registry and larger specimens found in contemporary monographic works, and this even extended to type specimens in some cases. (Note: The first edition listed the world record size for Perotrochus midas as 77.4 mm, but the 118.3 mm holotype and an even larger 127.5 mm specimen had both been cited in the comprehensive monograph of Anseeuw & Goto (1996).) The problem seemed to be particularly pronounced in the Pleurotomariidae—a family highly prized by shell collectors—where nine out of sixteen species had larger shells listed in the standard work on the family, that of Anseeuw & Goto (1996). Similar issues were found with the record sizes of Terebridae. (Note: An extreme example was Terebra funiculata, with the first edition listing a 32.5 mm record as compared to the 69 mm maximum given in Bratcher & Cernohorsky (1987).) Rosenberg concluded: "The Registry would be much more authoritative if it included record sizes from the literature, and I recommend this be done in future editions."

Gene Everson echoed Rosenberg in highlighting the changes from World Size Records as major improvements. In particular he praised the format and exhaustiveness of the publication, writing that, despite having almost double the entries of its predecessor, the registry was much easier to handle compared with the "heavy and bulky" Standard Catalog of Shells. He added that the authors' choice of coil binding made it easier to keep the registry open at the desired page.

Everson questioned some of the publication choices for the reference field, such as the conspicuous omission of "the definitive work on New Zealand shells", New Zealand Mollusca by Arthur William Baden Powell. He continued: "Many other landmark works by highly respected malacologists are omitted, while articles in periodicals frequently written by amateurs, such as La Conchliglia and American Conchologist, are [not]. It would seem the included 49 references were just those used by the authors for this edition." He suggested that future editions should clearly set out what types of references are acceptable. Summarising, Everson wrote:

This book is meant to be a useful, working and evolving tool and should not be nitpicked on details that are not relevant to its purpose. The authors are not producing a treatise on each family with hot-off-the-press reclassifications. I suspect they are following Vaught's classification which has been out for a few years, and is by no means perfect or up-to-date, but is readily available and inexpensive, and thus a good choice. But if so, this standard should be identified in the introduction, so that one knows where to find a shell. Also, typos are found in almost every book, and this is no exception, but they do not lessen the useful information, which is the main reason why we will buy this book. Two thumbs up!

=== Later editions ===
A review of the 11th (2014) edition by Robert Janowsky—a conchologist and longtime book dealer specialising in conchological literature—criticised the lack of pagination and, consequently, of an index, as well as the lack of page headings indicating families. Janowsky also found the work deficient in lacking information on how the sizes and taxonomic identities of the listed shells had been verified. The listed taxa were described as "a mish-mash of valid species and subspecies and sometimes form names and [...] quadrinomial names"; this, combined with a lack of author citations created scope for confusion wherever duplicate taxon names were present within a family. Summarising, he wrote: "I find it hard to recommend this book but if you absolutely, positively are interested in the sizes that have been reported for shells, th[e]n this is the only game in town."

The rule changes instituted following the registry's change of ownership in 2008 have been heavily criticised by California-based conchologist Roger A. Evans. In particular, the requirement that each shell be photographed has meant that many older records have been removed, either because the specimens are deposited at institutions such as museums that are reluctant to commit resources to such an endeavour, or because they belong to private collectors who are unaware of the rule change, unwilling or unable to comply (many being elderly), or in some cases even deceased. What is more, this rule change "effectively encouraged those seeking records to target older unphotographed listings", turning the project into what Evans described as a "photo contest".

Evans has attempted to remedy this situation by detailing historical size records of various Californian marine mollusc species—particularly those appearing in the Lost Operculum Club List of Champions—across a series of articles in The Festivus, beginning in 2020. His meticulous comparisons show that many of the post-2008 "record holders" are significantly smaller than specimens found in prior lists, some going back decades. Evans concluded:

While the photo rule may have been well-intended, LOC [Lost Operculum Club] records, responsibly gathered for decades prior to the WRS [Registry of World Record Size Shells], should have been grandfathered. Regrettably, the records of notable figures have been erased. Printed prior to the photo rule, the 2008 WRS edition remains the best source for legitimate record size shells, unless a larger specimen is shown in the most recent WRS listing.

He suggested that more regional efforts involving local specialists—such as that originally taken by the Lost Operculum Club List of Champions—might be better suited to maintaining accurate lists of record-size specimens.
