= Monstrotyphis yatesi =

Scientific classification
- Kingdom: Animalia
- Phylum: Mollusca
- Class: Gastropoda
- Subclass: Caenogastropoda
- Order: Neogastropoda
- Family: Muricidae
- Genus: Monstrotyphis
- Species: M. yatesi

Binomial name
- Monstrotyphis yatesi (Crosse & Fischer, 1865)

Synonyms
- Typhis yatesi Crosse & Fischer, 1865

Species of gastropod

Monstrotyphis yatesi is a species of sea snail, a marine gastropod mollusk in the family Muricidae, the murex snails or rock snails.
