= Apertifusus =

Scientific classification
- Kingdom: Animalia
- Phylum: Mollusca
- Class: Gastropoda
- Subclass: Caenogastropoda
- Order: Neogastropoda
- Superfamily: Buccinoidea
- Family: Fasciolariidae
- Genus: Apertifusus; Vermeij & Snyder, 2018

Type species
- Fusus meyeri Dunker, 1869

Genus of gastropods

Apertifusus is a genus of sea snails, marine gastropod mollusks in the family Fasciolariidae, the spindle snails, the tulip snails and their allies.

== Species ==
Species within the genus Apertifusus include:

- Apertifusus caparti (Adam & Knudsen, 1955)
- † Apertifusus clavatus (Brocchi, 1814)
- † Apertifusus etruscus (Pecchioli, 1862)
- Apertifusus frenguellii (Carcelles, 1953)
- Apertifusus josei (Hadorn & Rogers, 2000)
- Apertifusus meyeri (Dunker, 1869)
