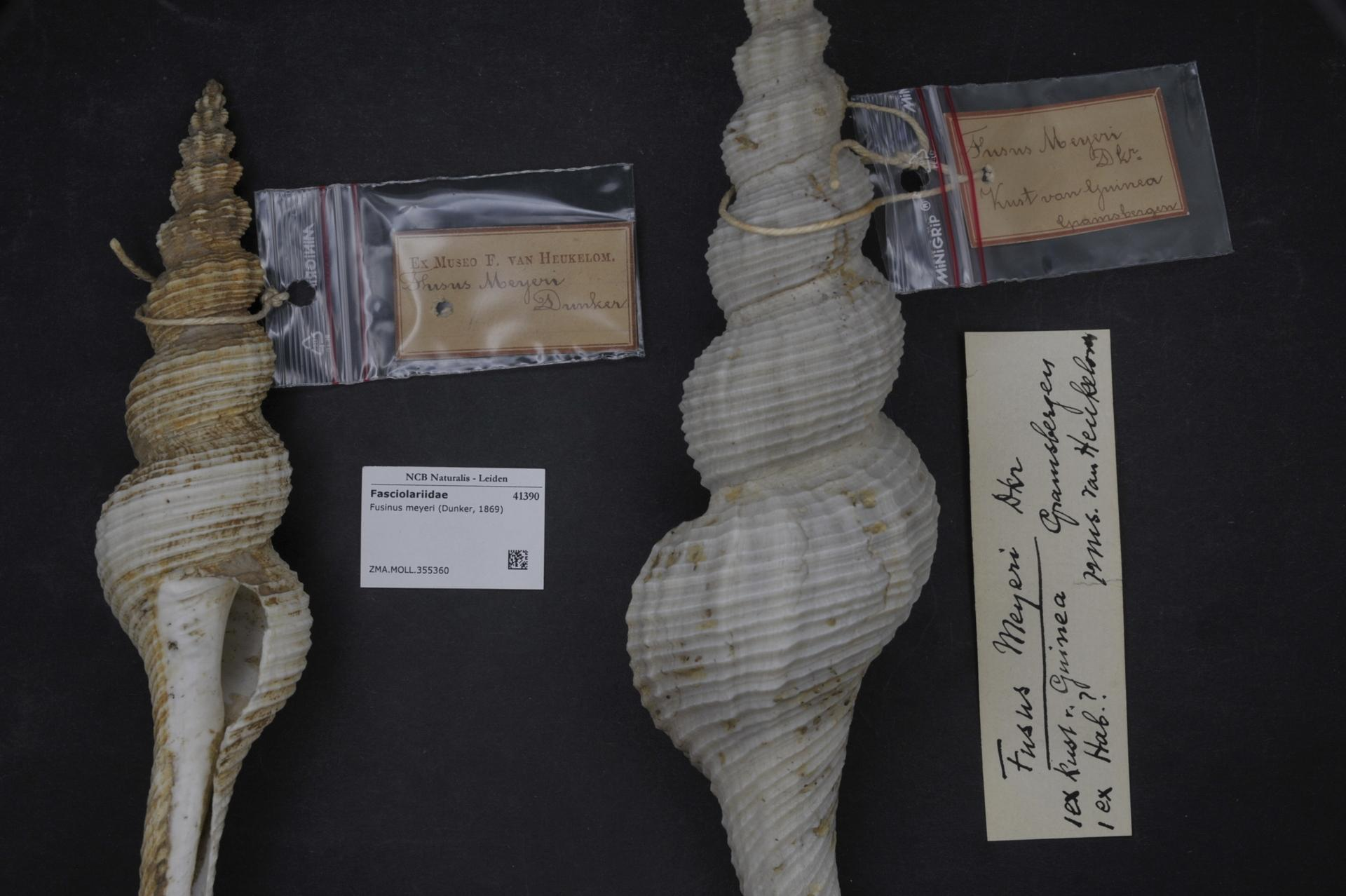

Scientific classification
- Kingdom: Animalia
- Phylum: Mollusca
- Class: Gastropoda
- Subclass: Caenogastropoda
- Order: Neogastropoda
- Family: Fasciolariidae
- Genus: Apertifusus
- Species: A. meyeri

Binomial name
- Apertifusus meyeri (Dunker, 1869)

Synonyms
- Fusinus meyeri (Dunker, 1869); Fusus meyeri Dunker, 1869

= Apertifusus meyeri =

Species of gastropod

Apertifusus meyeri is a species of sea snail, a marine gastropod mollusc in the family Fasciolariidae, which also includes spindle snails and tulip snails.
