= Livonia limpusi =

Scientific classification
- Kingdom: Animalia
- Phylum: Mollusca
- Class: Gastropoda
- Subclass: Caenogastropoda
- Order: Neogastropoda
- Family: Volutidae
- Genus: Livonia
- Species: L. limpusi

Binomial name
- Livonia limpusi Bail, 1999

Species of gastropod

Livonia limpusi is a species of sea snail, a marine gastropod mollusk in the family Volutidae, the volutes.
