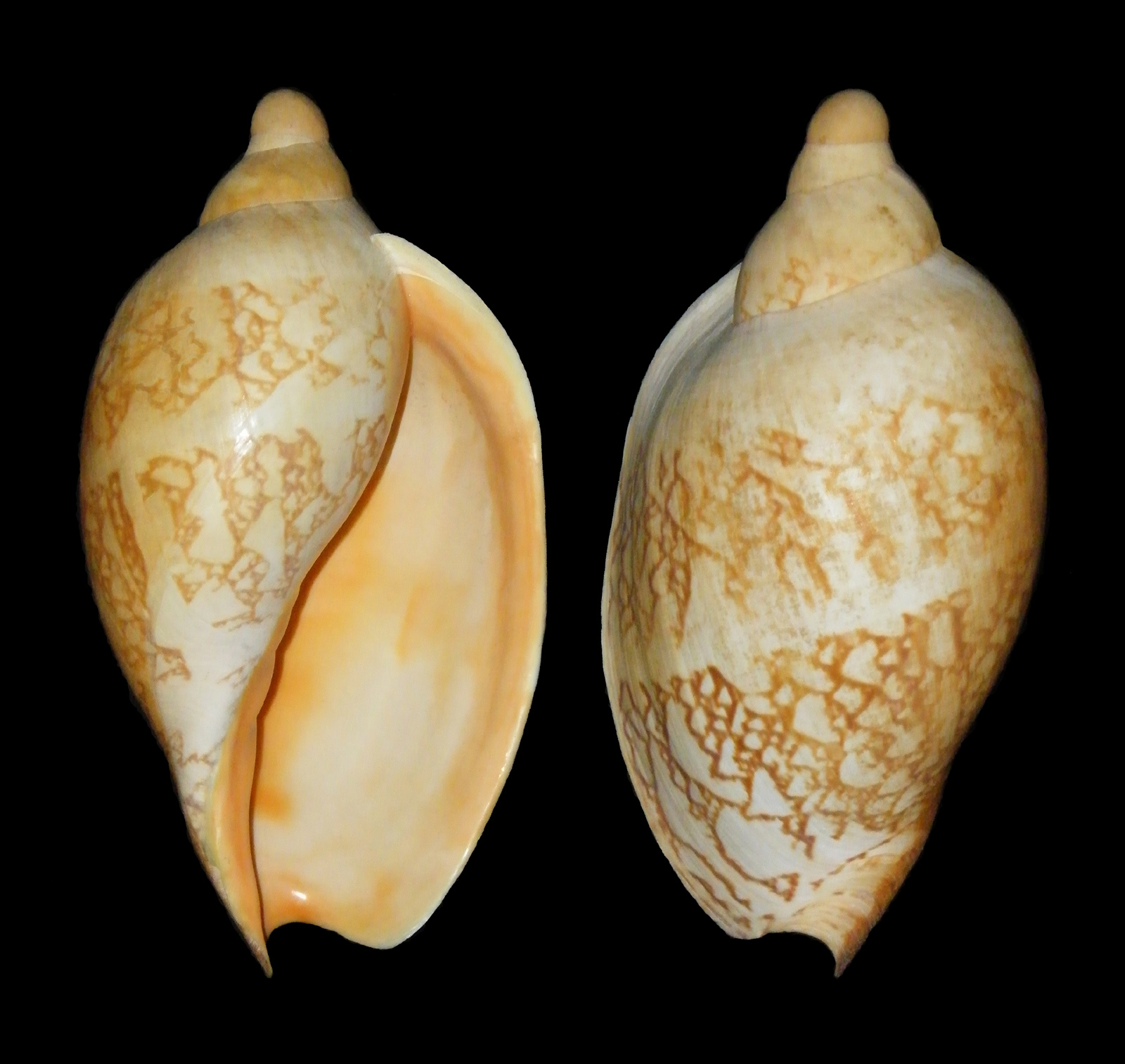
- shell of Livonia mammilla

Scientific classification
- Kingdom: Animalia
- Phylum: Mollusca
- Class: Gastropoda
- Subclass: Caenogastropoda
- Order: Neogastropoda
- Family: Volutidae
- Subfamily: Cymbiinae
- Tribe: Livoniini
- Genus: Livonia; Gray, 1855

Type species
- Voluta mammilla G. B. Sowerby I, 1844

species
- See text

Synonyms
- Cottonia Iredale, 1934; Mamillana Crosse, 1871 (nvalid: junior objective synonym of Livonia)

= Livonia (gastropod) =

Genus of gastropods

Livonia is a genus of medium-sized Indo-Pacific predatory sea snails, marine gastropod mollusks in the family Volutidae, the volutes.

The genus belongs to the clade Livoniini, which is usually placed in the subfamily Cymbiinae (but sometimes in the Fulgorariinae instead).

== Species ==
Species within the genus Livonia include:

- Livonia joerinkensi (Poppe, 1987)
- Livonia limpusi Bail, 1999
- Livonia mammilla (G. B. Sowerby I, 1844)
- Livonia mervcooperi Bail & Limpus, 2010
- Livonia nodiplicata (Cox, 1910)
- Livonia roadnightae (McCoy, 1881)

Synonyms

- Livonia quisqualis Iredale, 1957: synonym of Livonia roadnightae (McCoy, 1881)
