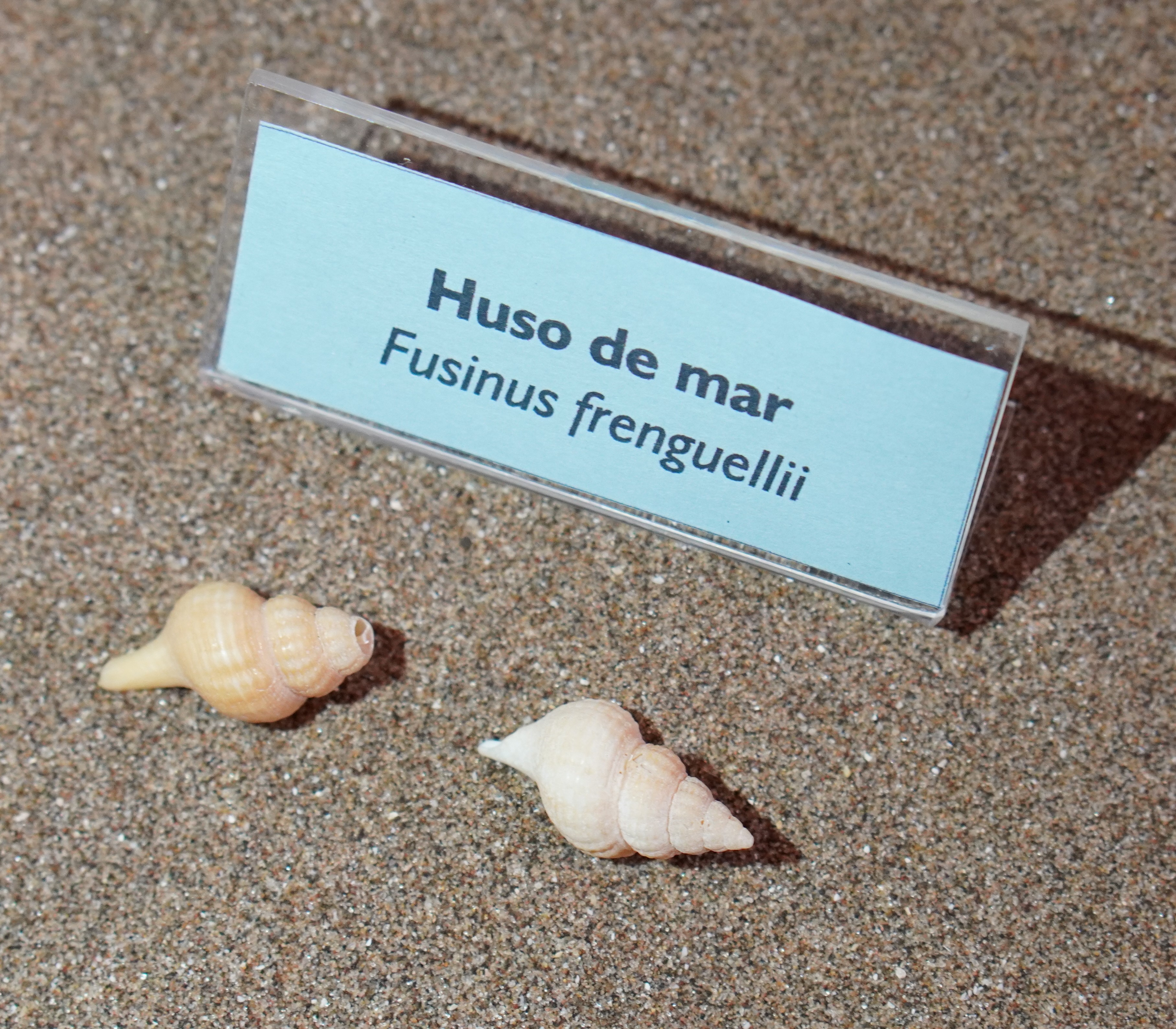
- Shells of the sea snail Apertifusus frenguellii

Scientific classification
- Kingdom: Animalia
- Phylum: Mollusca
- Class: Gastropoda
- Subclass: Caenogastropoda
- Order: Neogastropoda
- Family: Fasciolariidae
- Genus: Apertifusus
- Species: A. frenguellii

Binomial name
- Apertifusus frenguellii (Carcelles, 1953)

Synonyms
- Fusinus frenguelli [sic] (misspelling); Fusinus frenguellii (Carcelles, 1953); Lathyrus frenguellii Carcelles, 1953 (original combination)

= Apertifusus frenguellii =

Species of gastropod

Apertifusus frenguellii is a species of sea snail, a marine gastropod mollusc in the family Fasciolariidae, the spindle snails, the tulip snails and their allies.

== Distribution ==
This marine species occurs off Argentina.
