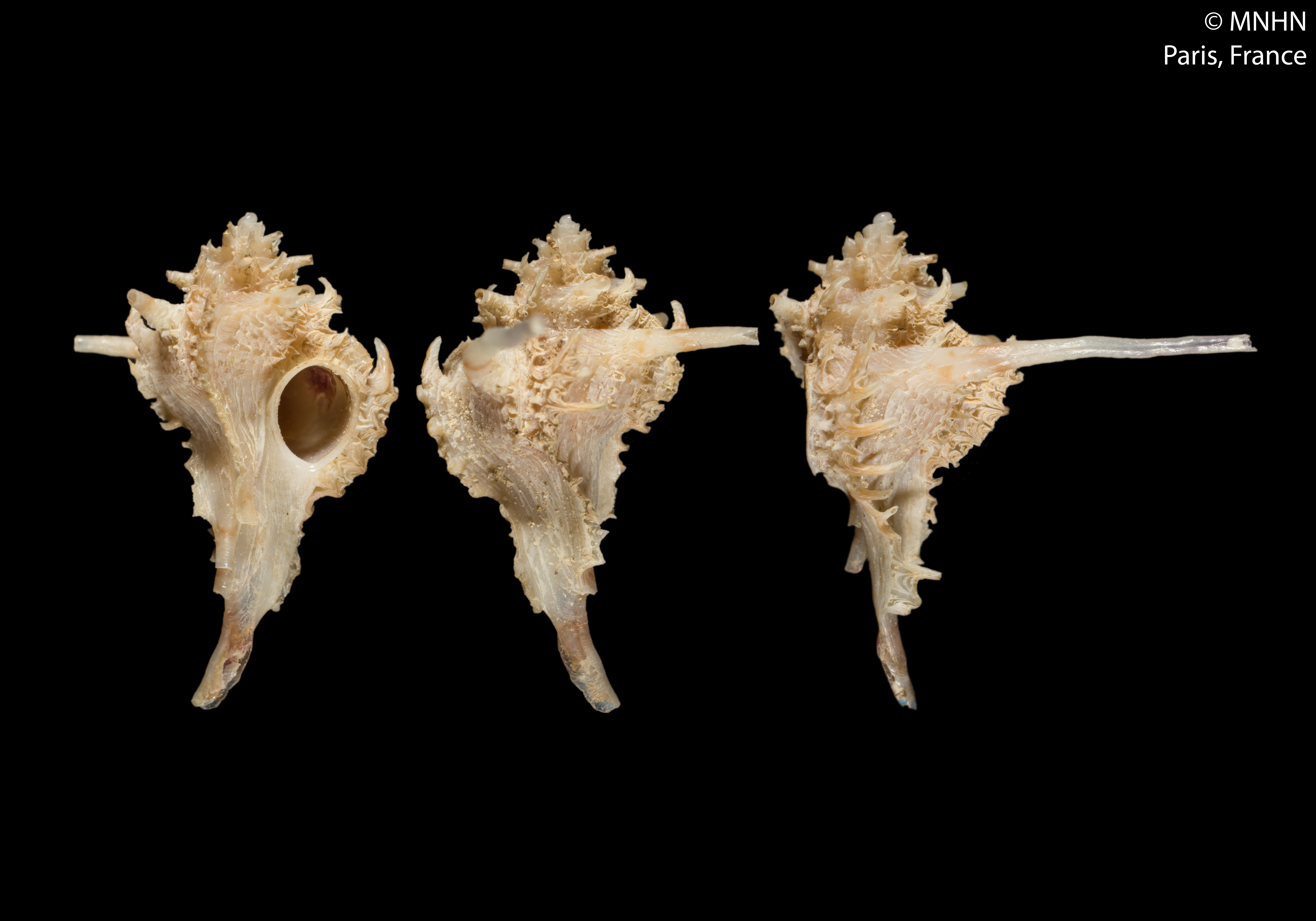

Scientific classification
- Kingdom: Animalia
- Phylum: Mollusca
- Class: Gastropoda
- Subclass: Caenogastropoda
- Order: Neogastropoda
- Family: Muricidae
- Genus: Monstrotyphis
- Species: M. carolinae

Binomial name
- Monstrotyphis carolinae (Houart, 1987)

Synonyms
- Typhis (Typhina) carolinae Houart, 1987

= Monstrotyphis carolinae =

Species of gastropod

Monstrotyphis carolinae is a species of sea snail, a marine gastropod mollusk in the family Muricidae, the murex snails or rock snails.

== Description ==
The length of the shell attains 20.5 mm.

== Distribution ==
This marine species occurs off New Caledonia.
