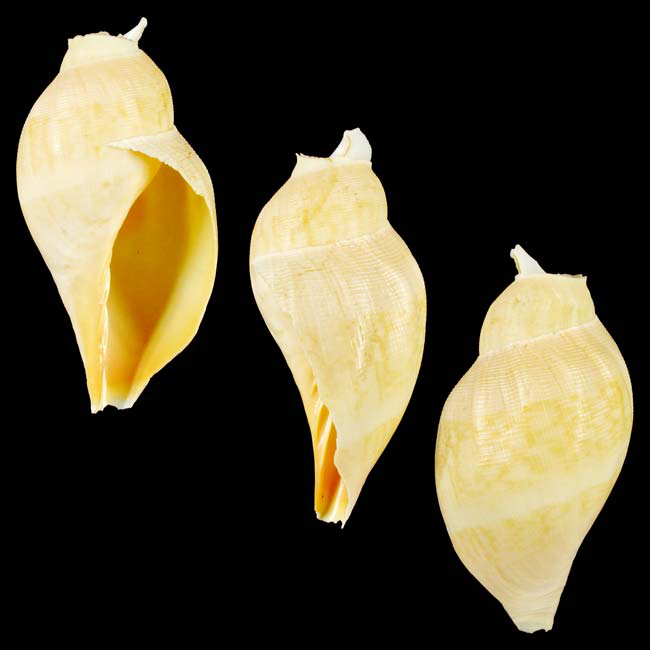

Scientific classification
- Kingdom: Animalia
- Phylum: Mollusca
- Class: Gastropoda
- Subclass: Caenogastropoda
- Order: Neogastropoda
- Family: Volutidae
- Genus: Livonia
- Species: L. joerinkensi

Binomial name
- Livonia joerinkensi (Poppe, 1987)

= Livonia joerinkensi =

Species of gastropod

Livonia joerinkensi is a species of sea snail, a marine gastropod mollusk in the family Volutidae, the volutes.

== Original Description ==
- (of Cottonia joerinkensi Poppe, 1987) Poppe G. (1987) A novel species of Volutidae from northwestern Australia. Apex 2(3–4): 99–113.
