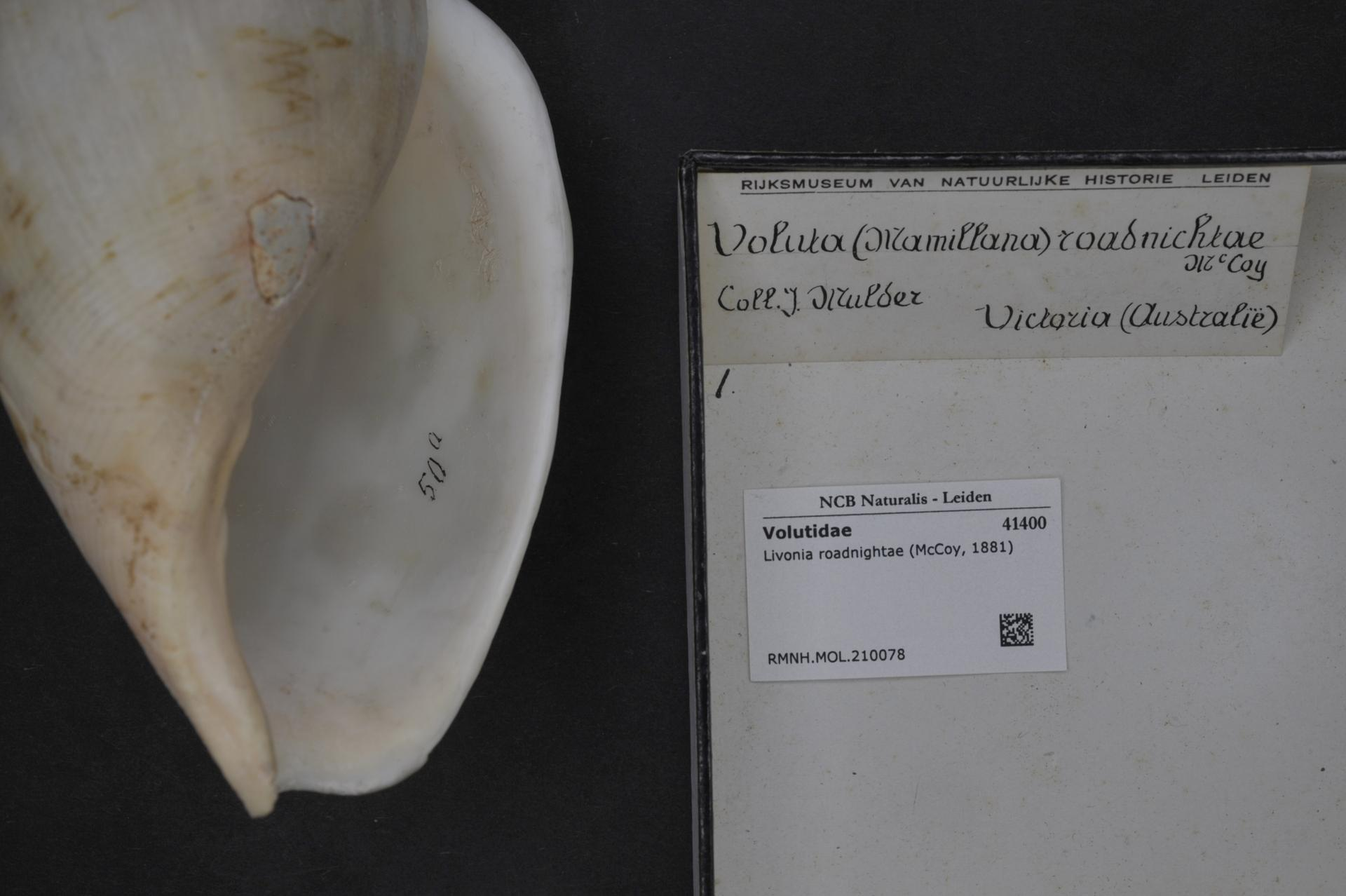

Scientific classification
- Kingdom: Animalia
- Phylum: Mollusca
- Class: Gastropoda
- Subclass: Caenogastropoda
- Order: Neogastropoda
- Family: Volutidae
- Genus: Livonia
- Species: L. roadnightae

Binomial name
- Livonia roadnightae (McCoy, 1881)

Synonyms
- Livonia quisqualis Iredale, 1957

= Livonia roadnightae =

Species of gastropod

Livonia roadnightae is a species of sea snail, a marine gastropod mollusk in the family Volutidae, the volutes.

== Description ==
This species attains a size of 110 to 225 mm in length when at adult size. The shell possesses three whorls. The shell possesses sharp jagged marks of varying degrees of appearance.

== Distribution ==
Trawled at 100-150 m in the sublittoral zone depth, off the coasts from New South Wales to Tasmania, Australia.
