= Monstrotyphis imperialis =

Scientific classification
- Kingdom: Animalia
- Phylum: Mollusca
- Class: Gastropoda
- Subclass: Caenogastropoda
- Order: Neogastropoda
- Family: Muricidae
- Genus: Monstrotyphis
- Species: M. imperialis

Binomial name
- Monstrotyphis imperialis (Keen & Campbell, 1964)

Synonyms
- Typhis (Typhina) imperialis Keen & Campbell, 1964

Species of gastropod

Monstrotyphis imperialis is a species of sea snail, a marine gastropod mollusk in the family Muricidae, the murex snails or rock snails.
