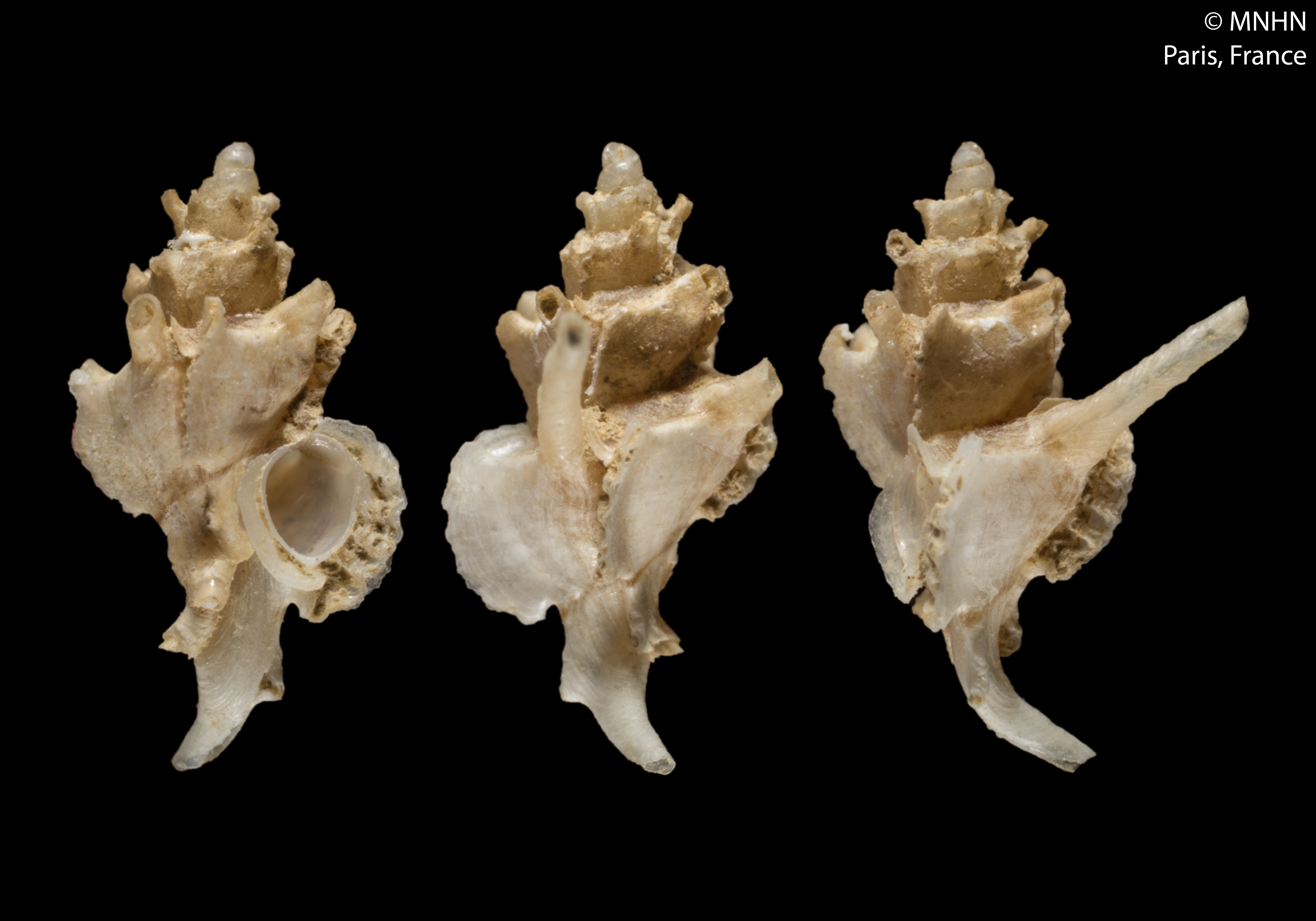

Scientific classification
- Kingdom: Animalia
- Phylum: Mollusca
- Class: Gastropoda
- Subclass: Caenogastropoda
- Order: Neogastropoda
- Family: Muricidae
- Genus: Monstrotyphis
- Species: M. singularis

Binomial name
- Monstrotyphis singularis Houart, 2002

= Monstrotyphis singularis =

Species of gastropod

Monstrotyphis singularis is a species of sea snail, a marine gastropod mollusk in the family Muricidae, the murex snails or rock snails.

== Description ==
The length of the shell attains 6.3 mm.

== Distribution ==
This marine species occurs off New Caledonia.
