= Apertifusus josei =

Scientific classification
- Kingdom: Animalia
- Phylum: Mollusca
- Class: Gastropoda
- Subclass: Caenogastropoda
- Order: Neogastropoda
- Family: Fasciolariidae
- Genus: Apertifusus
- Species: A. josei

Binomial name
- Apertifusus josei (Hadorn & Rogers, 2000)

Synonyms
- Fusinus josei Hadorn & Rogers, 2000 (original combination)

Species of gastropod

Fusinus josei is a species of sea snail, a marine gastropod mollusc in the family Fasciolariidae, the spindle snails, the tulip snails and their allies.

== Distribution ==
This marine species occurs in the Florida Strait.
