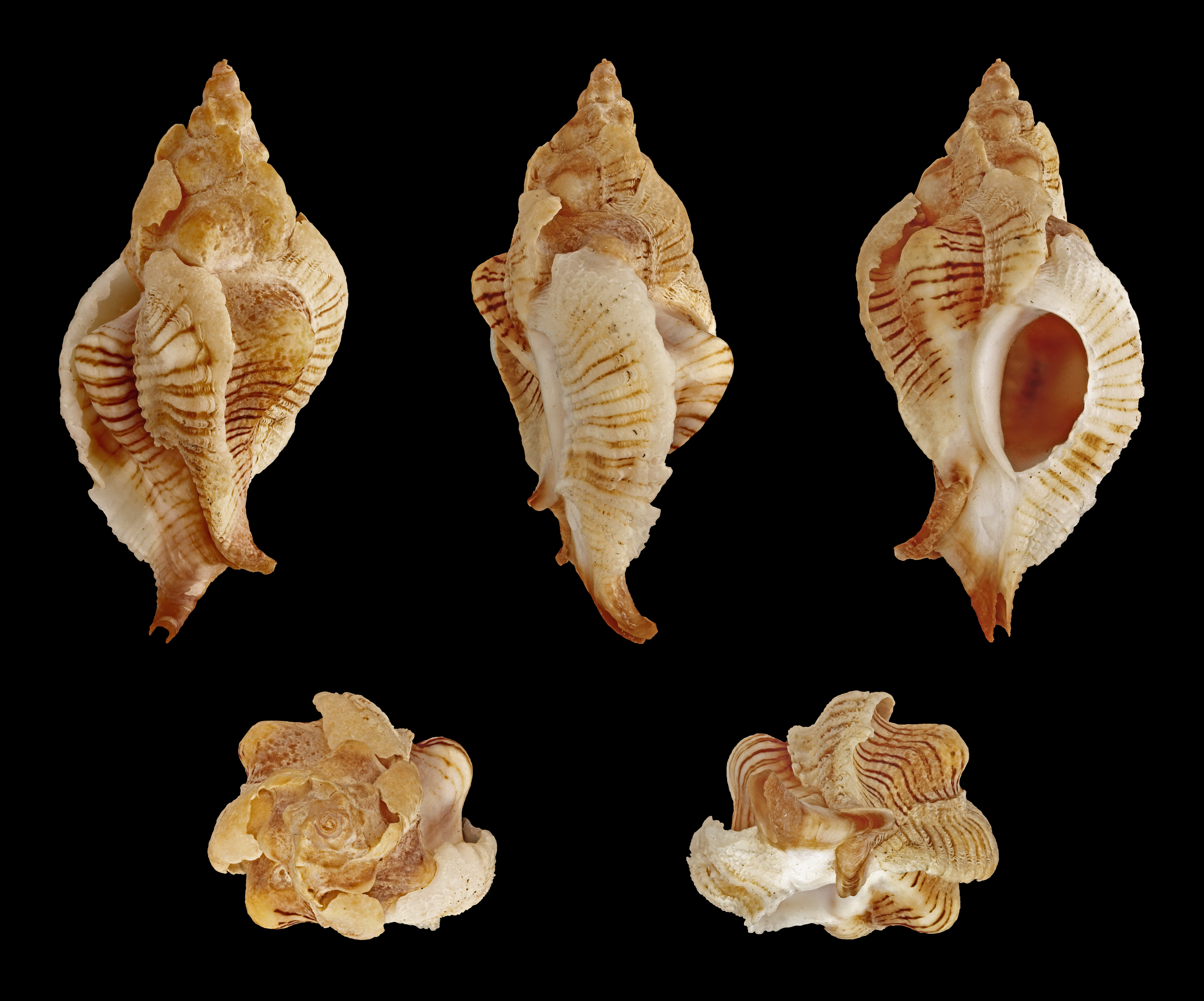

Scientific classification
- Kingdom: Animalia
- Phylum: Mollusca
- Class: Gastropoda
- Subclass: Caenogastropoda
- Order: Neogastropoda
- Family: Muricidae
- Subfamily: Ocenebrinae
- Genus: Pteropurpura
- Species: P. festiva

Binomial name
- Pteropurpura festiva Hinds, 1844

Synonyms
- Murex festivus Hinds, 1844 (original combination); Murex gaza M. Smith, 1940; Pteropurpura (Pteropurpura) festiva (Hinds, 1844)· accepted, alternate representation; Pteropurpura (Pteropurpura) gaza Smith, M., 1940; Shaskyus festivus (Hinds, 1844)

= Pteropurpura festiva =

Species of gastropod

Pteropurpura festiva, commonly known as the festive murex, is a species of predatory sea snail, a marine gastropod mollusk in the family Muricidae, the rock snails. Native to the Eastern Pacific, these sea snails grow to 34–67 mm in length.

This species was previously known as Murex festivus. Because the shell of this sea snail is attractive, and is common in San Diego, the name The Festivus was used for the San Diego Shell Club publication, which was started in 1970, became a science journal on malacology, and as of 2021 has been published for over 50 years.

== Description ==
The length of the shell varies between 20 mm and 67 mm.

The elongately ovate shell contains six convex whorls with three low, reflexed varices per whorl. These varices are finely frilled on front. Between these varices, a rib shows a large, blunt knob on the shoulder. The wide outer lip is finely dentate with 5-7 teeth inside. The columella is simple and smooth. The oval aperture shows a varix extending to the short, deep and recurved siphonal canal.

The ground color of the shell varies from white to light brown, crossed by evenly spaced, thin, incised, spiral dark brown lines

It is a formidable predator on mussels, limpets, barnacles and other snails. But through this biotic characteristic, it is responsible for resistance to the Asian mussel (Musculista senhousia) invasion in Southern California.

== Distribution ==
This marine species occurs abundantly in the intertidal zone and mud flats off Southern California, USA (with most records from Santa Barbara, Los Angeles and San Diego) to Baja California, Mexico
