= Monstrotyphis tangaroa =

Scientific classification
- Kingdom: Animalia
- Phylum: Mollusca
- Class: Gastropoda
- Subclass: Caenogastropoda
- Order: Neogastropoda
- Superfamily: Muricoidea
- Family: Muricidae
- Subfamily: Typhinae
- Genus: Monstrotyphis
- Species: M. tangaroa

Binomial name
- Monstrotyphis tangaroa Houart & B. A. Marshall, 2012

Species of gastropod

Monstrotyphis tangaroa is a species of sea snail, a marine gastropod mollusk, in the family Muricidae, the murex snails or rock snails.

== Distribution ==
This species occurs in New Zealand Exclusive Economic Zone.
