= Monstrotyphis montfortii =

Scientific classification
- Kingdom: Animalia
- Phylum: Mollusca
- Class: Gastropoda
- Subclass: Caenogastropoda
- Order: Neogastropoda
- Family: Muricidae
- Genus: Monstrotyphis
- Species: M. montfortii

Binomial name
- Monstrotyphis montfortii (A. Adams, 1863)

Synonyms
- Typhis montfortii A. Adams, 1863

Species of gastropod

Monstrotyphis montfortii is a species of sea snail, a marine gastropod mollusk in the family Muricidae, the murex snails or rock snails.
