= Monstrotyphis bivaricata =

Scientific classification
- Kingdom: Animalia
- Phylum: Mollusca
- Class: Gastropoda
- Subclass: Caenogastropoda
- Order: Neogastropoda
- Family: Muricidae
- Genus: Monstrotyphis
- Species: M. bivaricata

Binomial name
- Monstrotyphis bivaricata (Verco, 1909)

Synonyms
- Typhis bivaricata Verco, 1909

Species of gastropod

Monstrotyphis bivaricata is a species of sea snail, a marine gastropod mollusk in the family Muricidae, the murex snails or rock snails.
