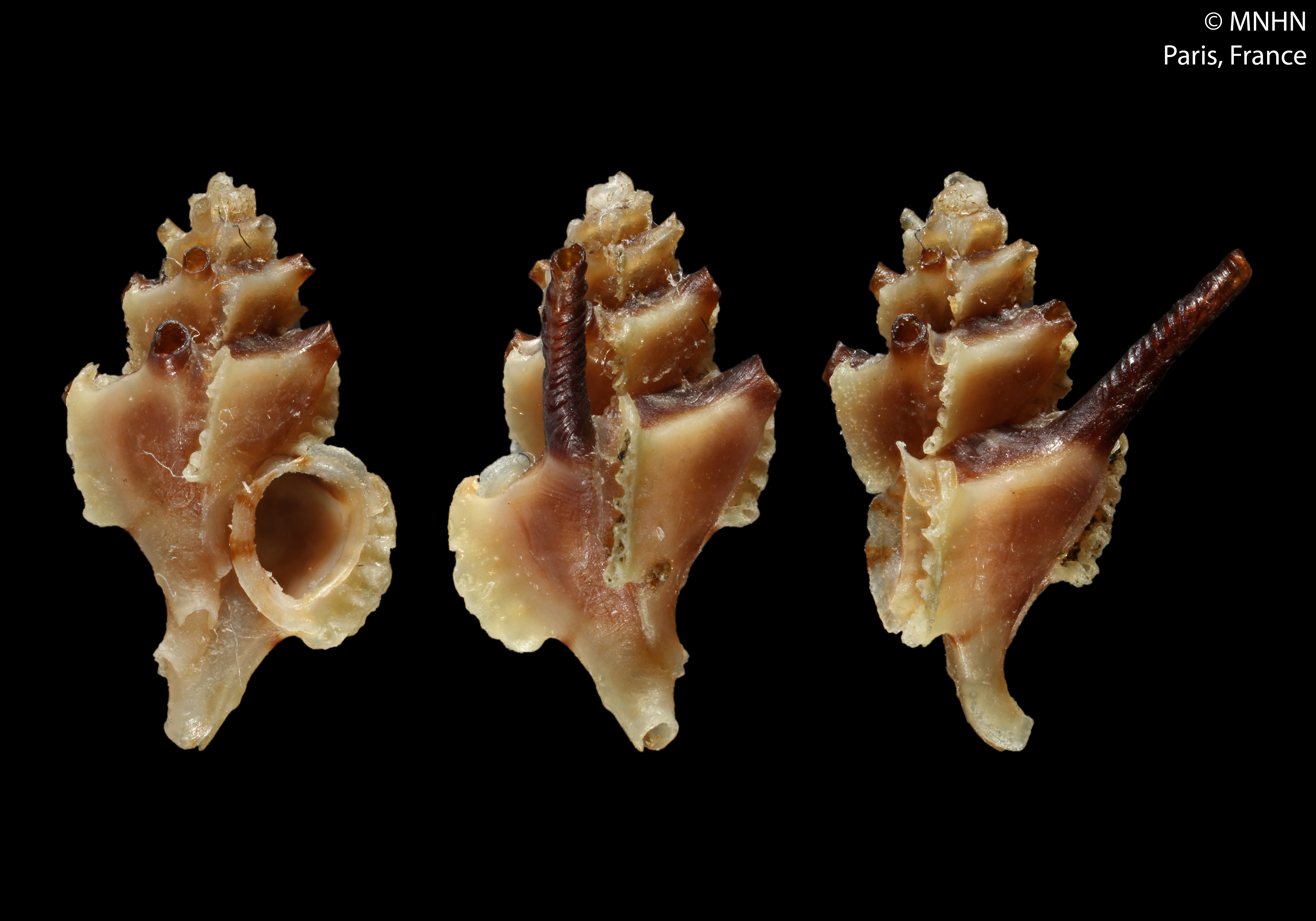
- Shell of Monstrotyphis takashigei (paratype at MNHN, Paris)

Scientific classification
- Kingdom: Animalia
- Phylum: Mollusca
- Class: Gastropoda
- Subclass: Caenogastropoda
- Order: Neogastropoda
- Family: Muricidae
- Subfamily: Typhinae
- Genus: Monstrotyphis
- Species: M. takashigei

Binomial name
- Monstrotyphis takashigei Houart & Chino, 2016

= Monstrotyphis takashigei =

Species of gastropod

Monstrotyphis takashigei is a species of sea snail, a marine gastropod mollusk, in the family Muricidae, the murex snails or rock snails.

== Description ==
The length of the shell attains 7.3 mm. It was found in Akinohama, Izu-Oshima, at a depth of 55 meters. The snail is small in comparison with the species of same genus and can go up to 9.3 mm in length. The shell color is brown, yellowish brown, or white yellow brown. Some brown spots can be seen at the base of the anterior canal and the shell opening is white. The name 'takashigei' comes from a Tokyo resident, Hiroshi Takashigei, who discovered this species.

== Distribution ==
This marine species occurs off Japan.
