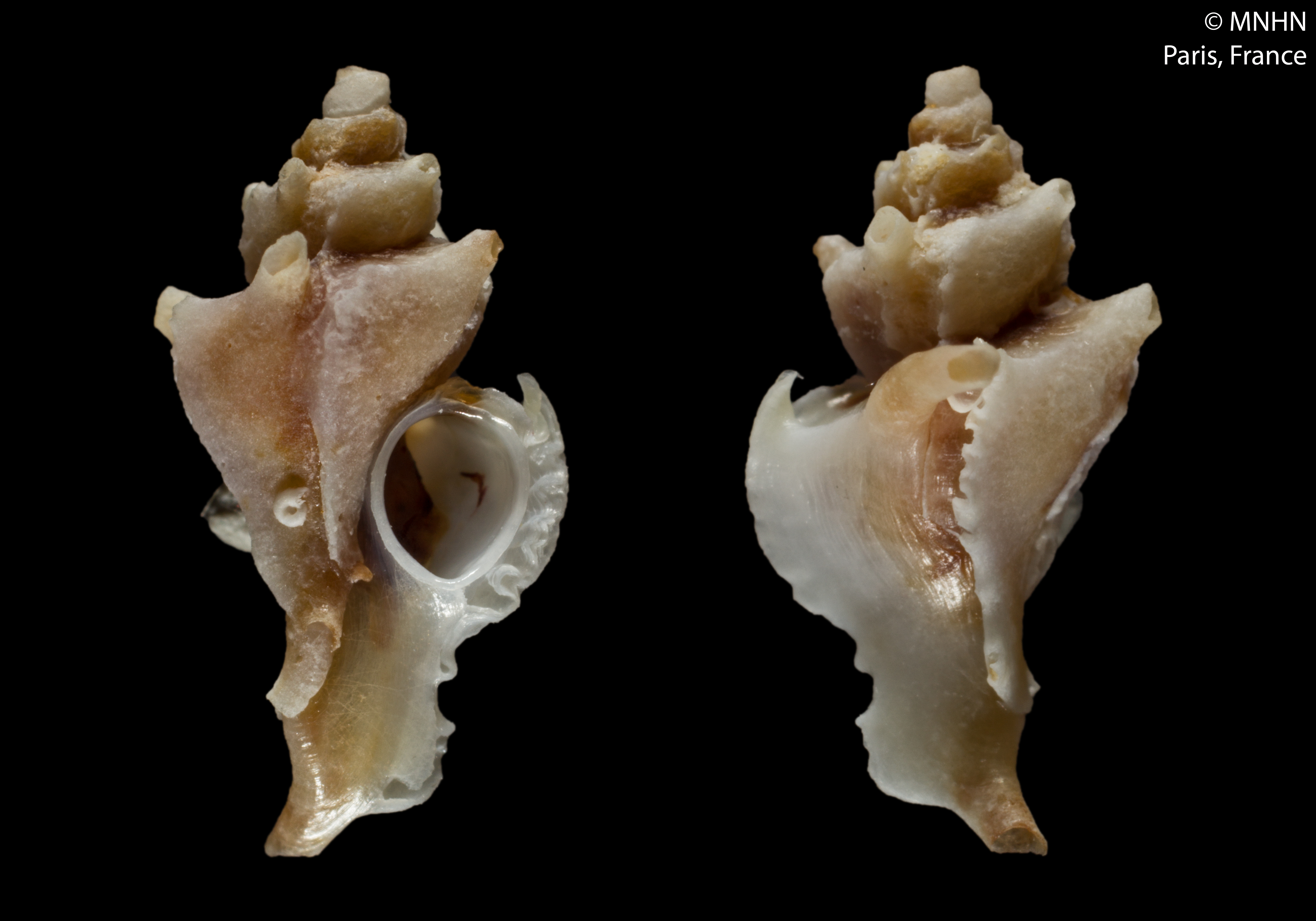

Scientific classification
- Kingdom: Animalia
- Phylum: Mollusca
- Class: Gastropoda
- Subclass: Caenogastropoda
- Order: Neogastropoda
- Superfamily: Muricoidea
- Family: Muricidae
- Subfamily: Typhinae
- Genus: Monstrotyphis
- Species: M. goniodes

Binomial name
- Monstrotyphis goniodes Houart, Gori & Rosado, 2017

= Monstrotyphis goniodes =

Species of gastropod

Monstrotyphis goniodes is a species of sea snail, a marine gastropod mollusk, in the family Muricidae, the murex snails or rock snails.

== Description ==
The length of the shell attains 9.5 mm.

== Distribution ==
This marine species occurs in Oman.
