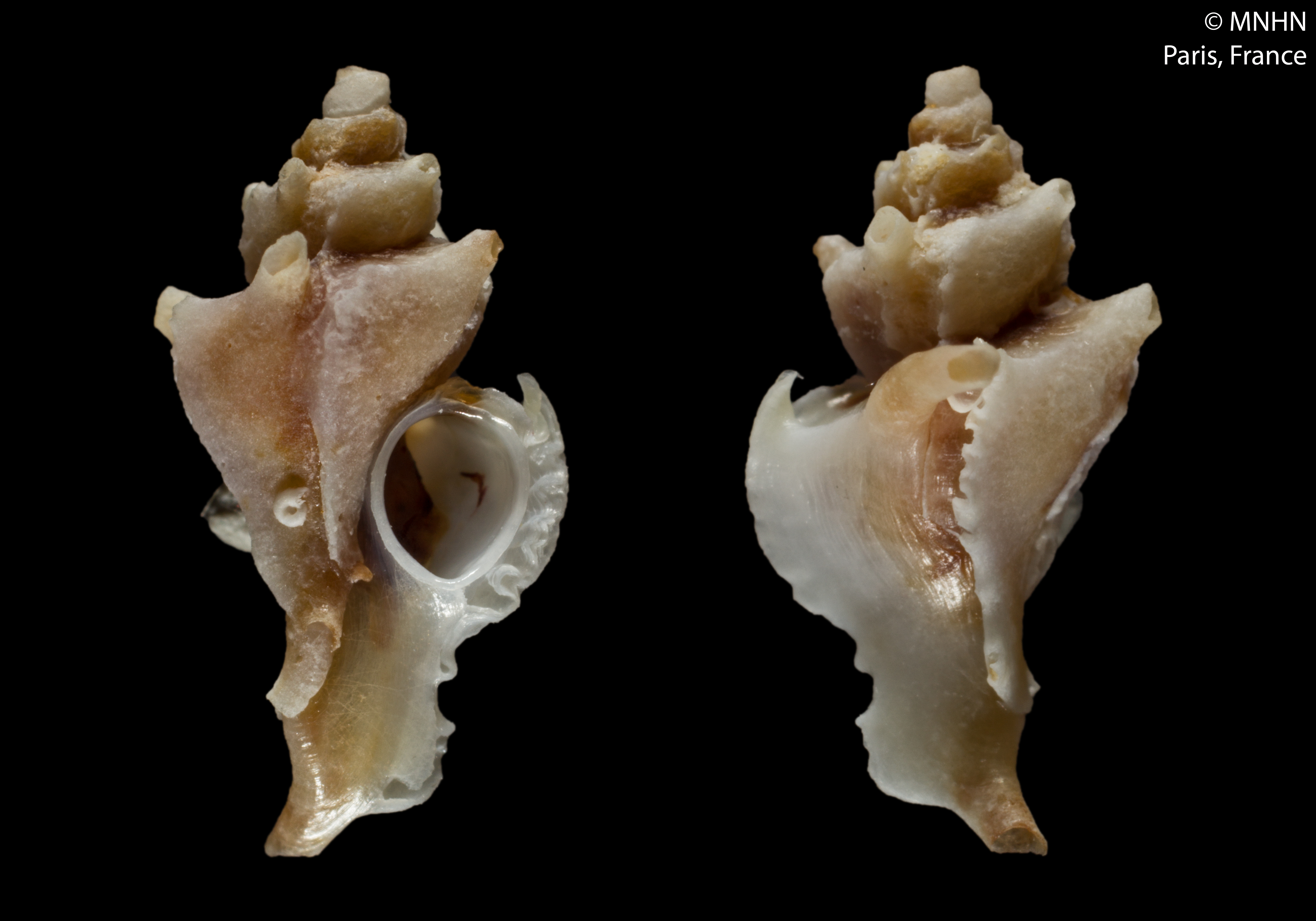
- Shell of Monstrotyphis goniodes (holotype at MNHN, Paris)

Scientific classification
- Kingdom: Animalia
- Phylum: Mollusca
- Class: Gastropoda
- Subclass: Caenogastropoda
- Order: Neogastropoda
- Superfamily: Muricoidea
- Family: Muricidae
- Subfamily: Typhinae
- Genus: Monstrotyphis; Habe, 1961

Type species
- Typhis (Typhinellus) tosaensis Azuma, 1960

= Monstrotyphis =

Genus of gastropods

Monstrotyphis is a genus of sea snails, marine gastropod mollusks in the family Muricidae, the murex snails or rock snails.

== Species ==
Species within the genus Monstrotyphis include:

- Monstrotyphis anapaulae Houart & Rosado, 2019
- Monstrotyphis bivaricata (Verco, 1909)
- Monstrotyphis carolinae (Houart, 1987)
- Monstrotyphis goniodes Houart, Gori & Rosado, 2017
- Monstrotyphis imperialis (Keen & Campbell, 1964)
- Monstrotyphis jardinreinensis (Espinosa, 1985)
- Monstrotyphis montfortii (A. Adams, 1863)
- Monstrotyphis pauperis (Mestayer, 1916)
- Monstrotyphis sera Garrigues, 2021
- Monstrotyphis singularis Houart, 2002
- Monstrotyphis takashigei Houart & Chino, 2016
- Monstrotyphis tangaroa Houart & Marshall, 2012
- Monstrotyphis teramachii (Keen & Campbell, 1964)
- Monstrotyphis tosaensis (Azuma, 1960)
- Monstrotyphis yatesi (Crosse & Fischer, 1865)
