= Clavagella =

Clavagella Temporal range: 72.1–0 Ma

Scientific classification
- Domain: Eukaryota
- Kingdom: Animalia
- Phylum: Mollusca
- Class: Bivalvia
- Family: Clavagellidae
- Genus: Clavagella; Blainville 1817

Species
- See text

Synonyms
- Bacilia Gray, 1858

Genus of bivalves

Clavagella is a genus of marine bivalves in the family Clavagellidae.

== Taxonomy ==
Subgenera:

- Clavagella (Bryopa) (Gray 1847)
- Clavagella (Clavagella) Blainville 1817
- Clavagella (Dacosta) Gray 1858

Species:

- †Clavagella elegans Müller, 1859
- Clavagella liratum (Tate, 1887)
- Clavagella melitensis
- Clavagella primigenia Deshayes 1857

== Fossil species ==
The genus is also represented in the fossil record.

Clavagella elegans is from the Campanian-Maastrichtian (Upper Cretaceous) of Tinrhert in the Sahara province of Algeria. The type specimen (number MNHN.F.R53841) is kept at the Museum National d'Histoire Naturelle in Paris.
