= Monstrotyphis pauperis =

Scientific classification
- Kingdom: Animalia
- Phylum: Mollusca
- Class: Gastropoda
- Subclass: Caenogastropoda
- Order: Neogastropoda
- Family: Muricidae
- Genus: Monstrotyphis
- Species: M. pauperis

Binomial name
- Monstrotyphis pauperis (Mestayer, 1916)

Synonyms
- Typhis pauperis Mestayer, 1916

Species of gastropod

Monstrotyphis pauperis is a species of sea snail, a marine gastropod mollusk in the family Muricidae, the murex snails or rock snails.
