= Monstrotyphis tosaensis =

Scientific classification
- Kingdom: Animalia
- Phylum: Mollusca
- Class: Gastropoda
- Subclass: Caenogastropoda
- Order: Neogastropoda
- Family: Muricidae
- Genus: Monstrotyphis
- Species: M. tosaensis

Binomial name
- Monstrotyphis tosaensis (Azuma, 1960)

Synonyms
- Typhis (Typhinellus) tosaensis Azuma, 1960

Species of gastropod

Monstrotyphis tosaensis is a species of sea snail, a marine gastropod mollusk in the family Muricidae, the murex snails or rock snails.
