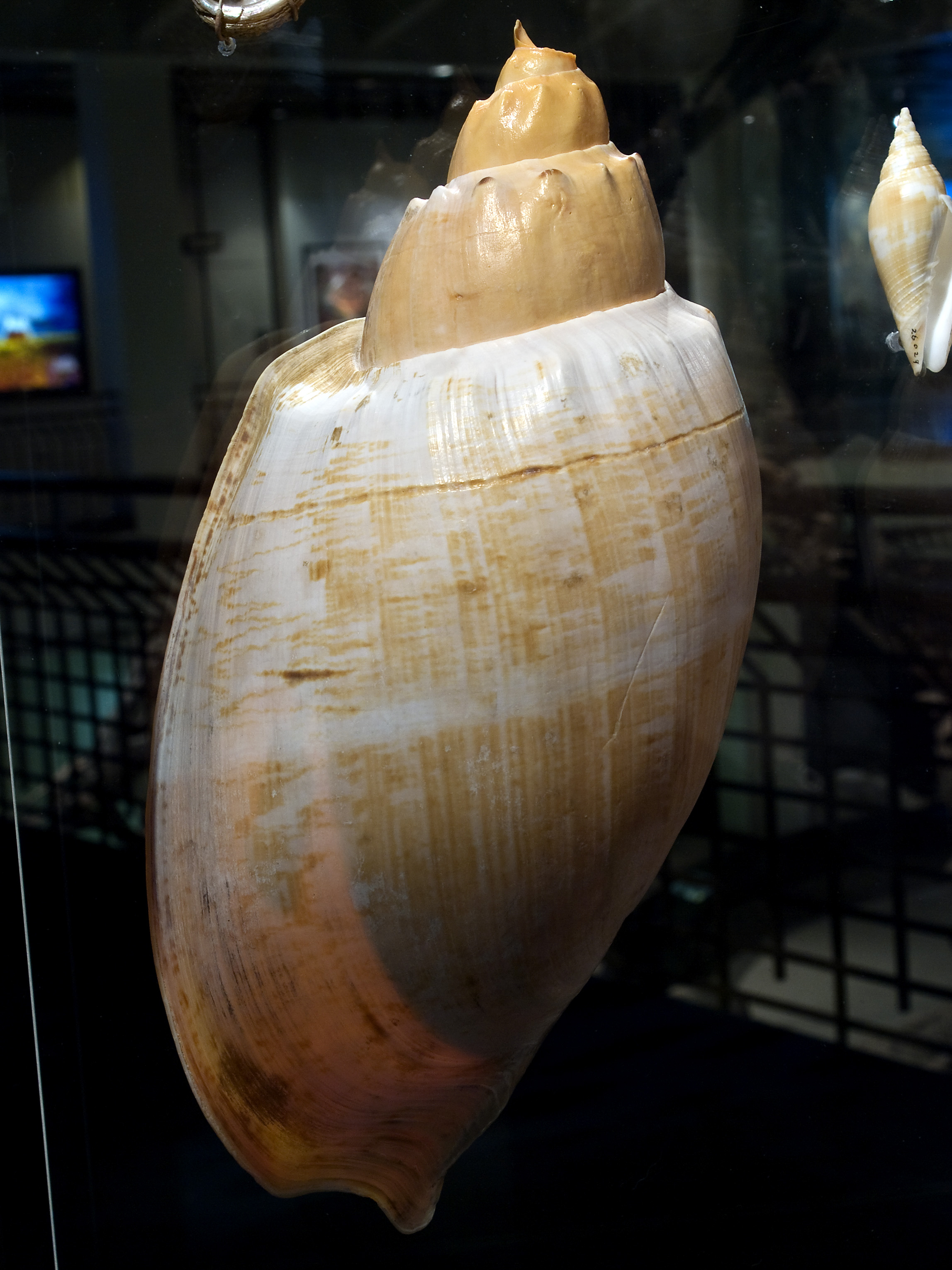

Scientific classification
- Kingdom: Animalia
- Phylum: Mollusca
- Class: Gastropoda
- Subclass: Caenogastropoda
- Order: Neogastropoda
- Family: Volutidae
- Genus: Livonia
- Species: L. nodiplicata

Binomial name
- Livonia nodiplicata Cox, 1910)

Synonyms
- Scaphella dannevigi Verco, 1912

= Livonia nodiplicata =

Species of sea snail

Livonia nodiplicata is a species of sea snail, a marine gastropod mollusk in the family Volutidae, the volutes.
