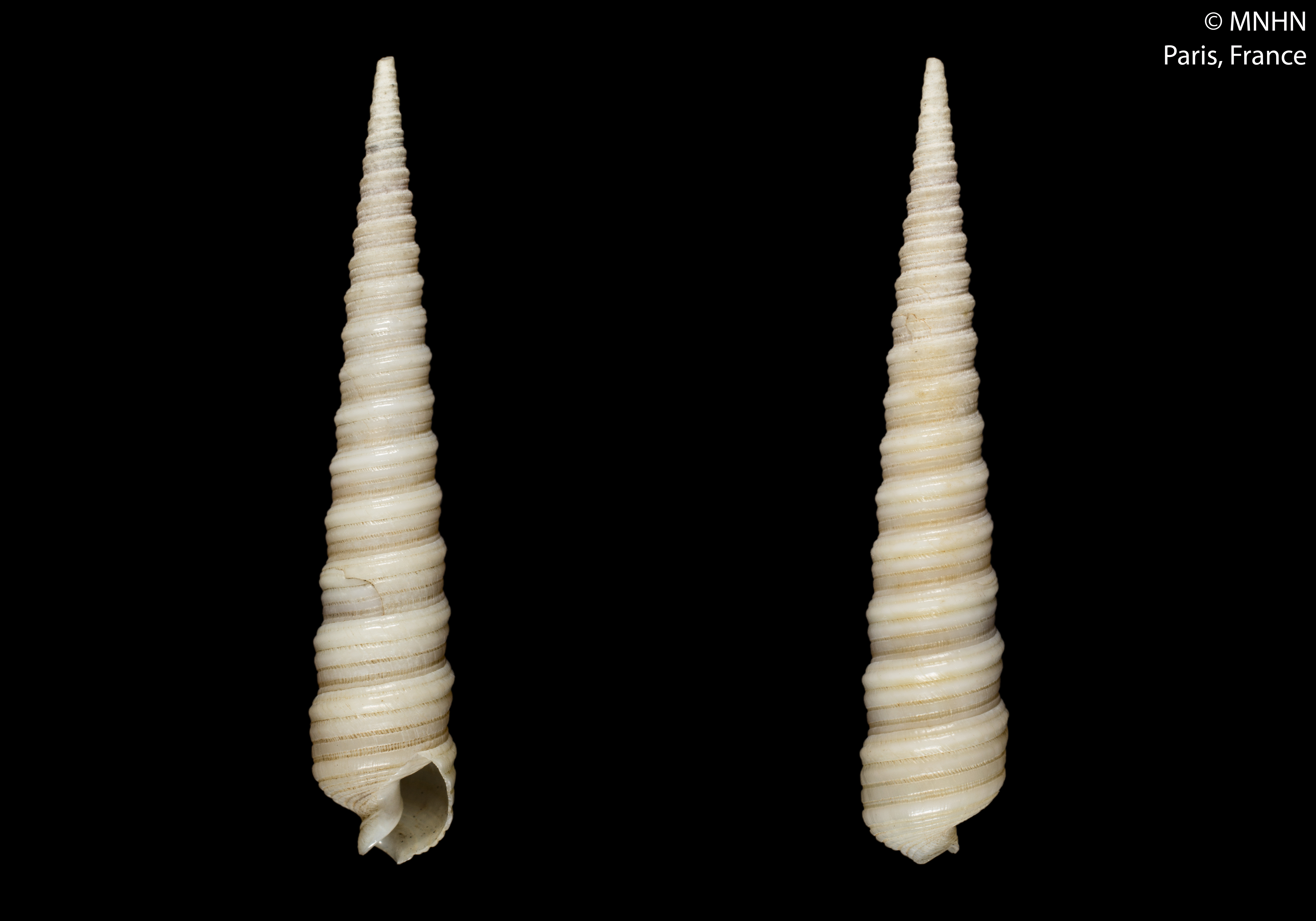
- Shell of Terebra funiculata (holotype at MNHN, Paris)

Scientific classification
- Kingdom: Animalia
- Phylum: Mollusca
- Class: Gastropoda
- Subclass: Caenogastropoda
- Order: Neogastropoda
- Superfamily: Conoidea
- Family: Terebridae
- Genus: Terebra
- Species: T. funiculata

Binomial name
- Terebra funiculata Hinds, 1844

Synonyms
- Dimidacus funiculata (Hinds, 1844); Terebra langfordi Pilsbry, 1921; Terebra langfordi angustior Pilsbry, 1921

= Terebra funiculata =

Species of gastropod

Terebra funiculata is a species of sea snail, a marine gastropod mollusc in the family Terebridae, the auger snails.

== Literature ==
- Deshayes, G. P., 1859. A general review of the genus Terebra, and a description of new species. Proceedings of the Zoological Society of London 27: 270-321
- Pilsbry, H. A. (1921). Marine mollusks of Hawaii, VIII-XIII. Proceedings of the Academy of Natural Sciences of Philadelphia. 72: 296–328, pl. 12
- Bratcher, T., 1977. Deshayes' terebrid types in Ecole des Mines, Paris. The Nautilus 91(2): 39-42
- Severns, M. (2011). Shells of the Hawaiian Islands - The Sea Shells. Conchbooks, Hackenheim. 564 pp
- Liu, J.Y. [Ruiyu] (ed.). (2008). Checklist of marine biota of China seas. China Science Press. 1267 pp
- Steyn, D. G.; Lussi, M. (2005). Offshore Shells of Southern Africa: A pictorial guide to more than 750 Gastropods. Published by the authors. pp. i–vi, 1–289
