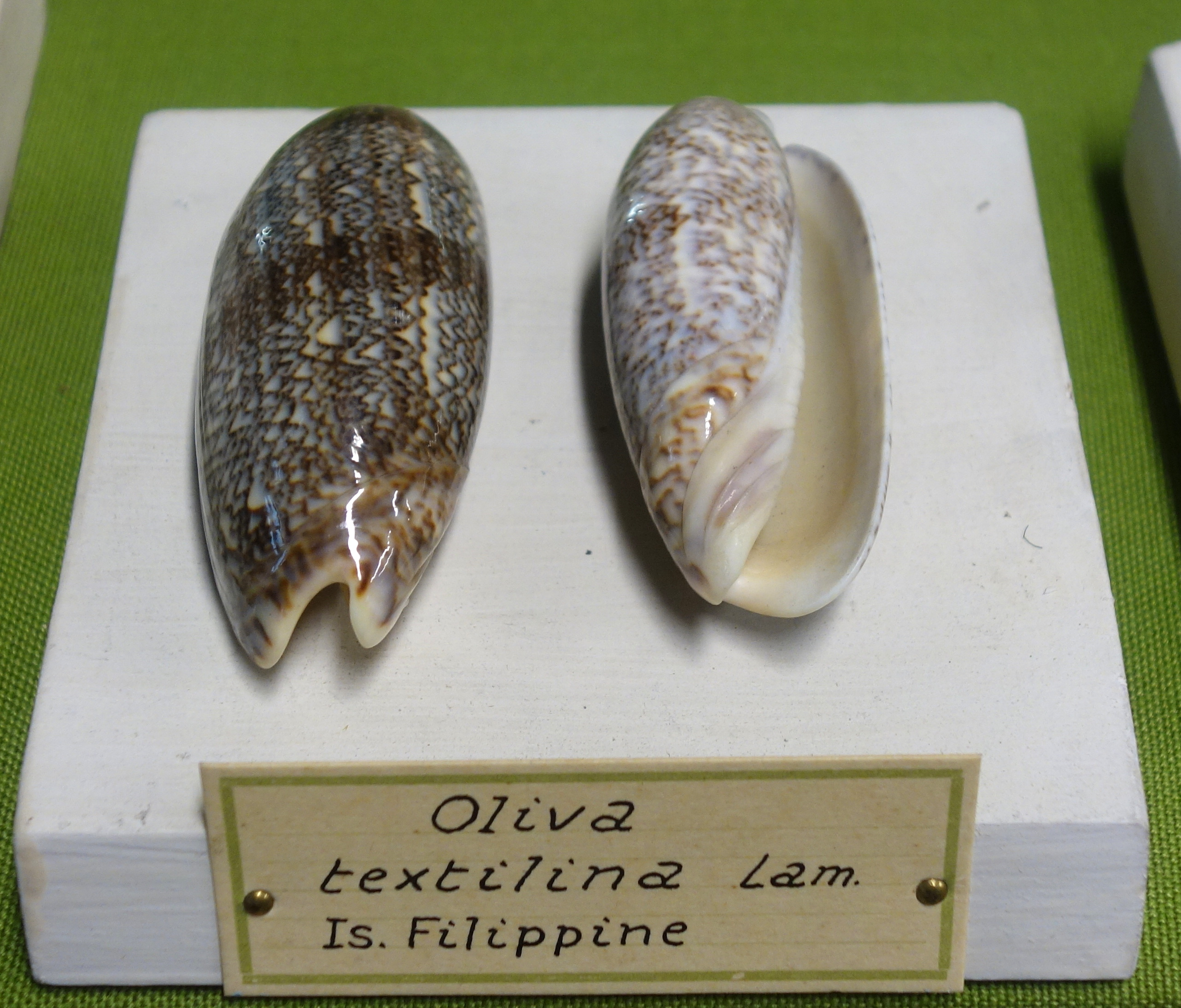

Scientific classification
- Kingdom: Animalia
- Phylum: Mollusca
- Class: Gastropoda
- Subclass: Caenogastropoda
- Order: Neogastropoda
- Family: Olividae
- Genus: Oliva
- Species: O. sericea

Binomial name
- Oliva sericea (Röding, 1798)

Synonyms
- Oliva (Galeola) sericea Röding, 1798· accepted, alternate representation; Oliva galeola Duclos, 1840; Oliva granitella Lamarck, 1811; Oliva sabulosa Marrat, 1868; Oliva textilina Lamarck, 1811; Porphyria sericea Röding, 1798 (original combination)

= Oliva sericea =

Species of gastropod

Oliva sericea is a species of sea snail, a marine gastropod mollusk in the family Olividae, the olives.

== Description ==
The length of the shell varies between 55 mm and 112 mm.

== Distribution ==
This marine species occurs in the Eastern Indian Ocean; off Indonesia and the Philippines; off Ryukyu Islands, Japan, and off Polynesia.
