= Babelomurex santacruzensis =

Scientific classification
- Kingdom: Animalia
- Phylum: Mollusca
- Class: Gastropoda
- Subclass: Caenogastropoda
- Order: Neogastropoda
- Superfamily: Muricoidea
- Family: Muricidae
- Subfamily: Coralliophilinae
- Genus: Babelomurex
- Species: B. santacruzensis

Binomial name
- Babelomurex santacruzensis (Emerson & D'Attilio, 1970)

Species of gastropod

Babelomurex santacruzensis is a species of sea snail, a marine gastropod mollusk, in the family Muricidae, the murex snails or rock snails.
