= The Festivus =

- Discipline: Malacology, conchology
- Language: English
- Edited by: 1970-1976 Blanche Brewer 1976-2014 Carole Hertz 2014-present David P. Berschauer & David B. Waller

Publication details
- History: 1970-present
- Publisher: San Diego Shell Club (United States)
- Frequency: Quarterly

Standard abbreviations
- ISO 4: Festivus

Indexing
- ISSN: 0738-9388
- OCLC no.: 4699208

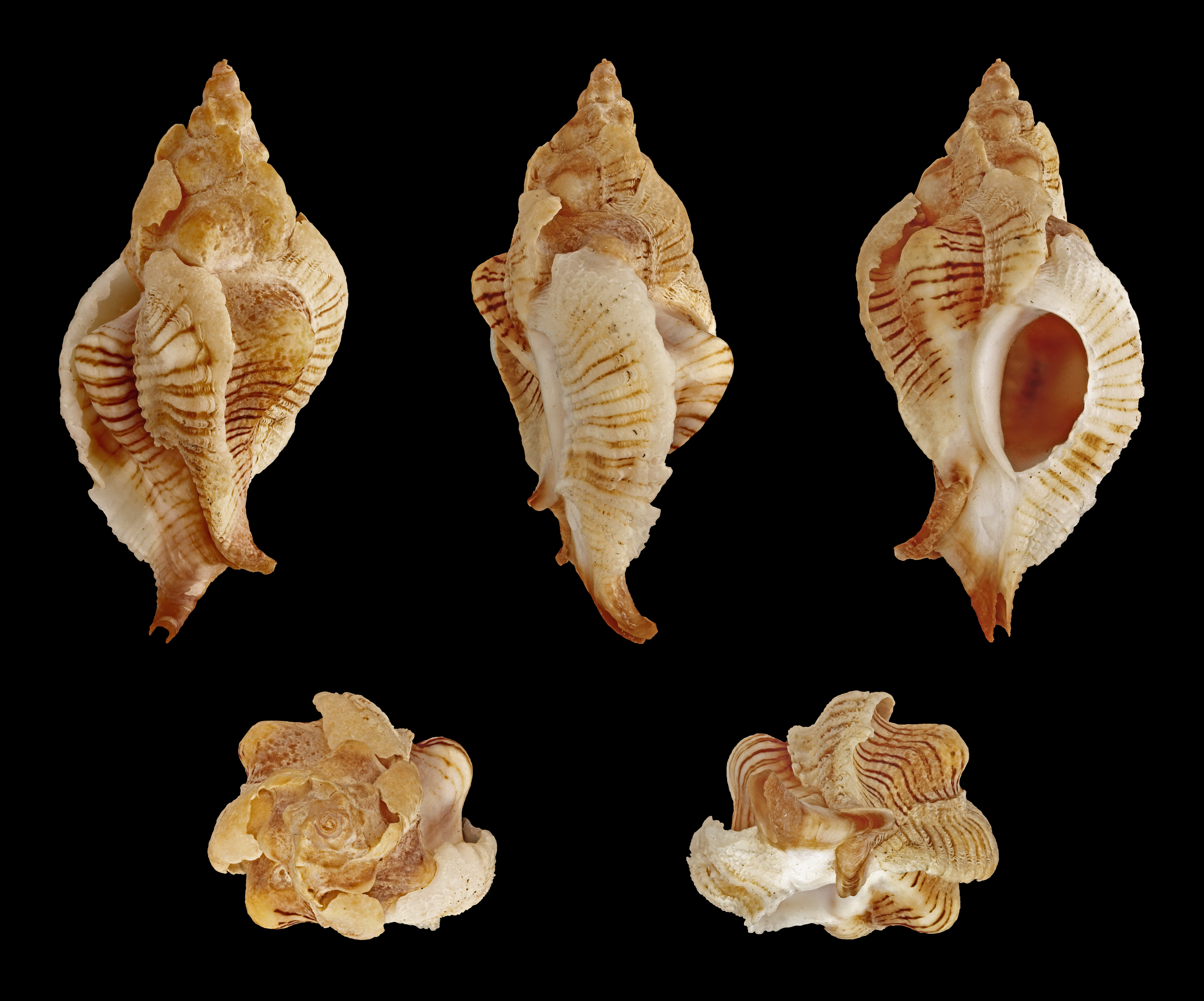
The publication is named after this attractive local marine gastropod species: Pteropurpura festiva (Hinds, 1844)

The Festivus is a publication about malacology and conchology. It is published by the San Diego Shell Club in San Diego, California. The Festivus started in 1970 as a shell club newsletter which was edited by Blanche Brewer. In 1976 Carole Hertz became the editor, and gradually The Festivus became increasingly scientifically respectable, and was transformed into a peer-reviewed scientific journal. Carole Hertz was the editor for 37 years. From 1985 up until 2014, issues of The Festivus contained scientific papers on mollusks, and each paper was peer-reviewed by a professional malacologist. Eleven issues were published annually: one issue per month, except for the month of December.

In March 2014, the editorship changed dramatically: David P. Berschauer and David B. Waller became co-editors. The journal was altered in both format and scope; it became a quarterly publication in full color, and included scientific articles, popular articles and advertising. The main focus of the journal is still scientific peer-reviewed articles, including descriptions of new taxa. Articles of general interest are also published, and are located in the back half of the journal. At the end of 2017, over 200 copies of The Festivus were printed and distributed each quarter.

== Name ==
The publication was named in honor of a species of carnivorous sea snail which occurs locally: the "Festive Murex", previously known as Murex festivus, and now known as Pteropurpura festiva.

== History ==
The Festivus was established in 1970 as a shell club newsletter edited by Blanche Brewer. Carole Hertz was the second editor, and after 1976, under her guidance, the publication grew and evolved into a scientific journal. The journal was published monthly from January through November each year. In 1984, the journal had a "sleek new look" and obtained an ISSN number. The front page of the January 1985 issue included, for the first time, a list of a Scientific Review Board of nine professional malacologists. By 2006, there were 13 professionals in the Review Board. Fifteen special issues and book-length special supplements were published between 1978 and 2002.

During 1977, an error was made in the volume numbers printed in the journal issues. The first eight issues of 1977 were correctly shown as being part of Volume VIII. However, the last three issues of that year were listed as being part of Volume IX. Despite this error in numbering, there are no "missing issues".

== Changes in 2014 ==
In February 2014, it was announced that The Festivus was changing editorship and it would, from that point on, be published quarterly in both electronic and print format. In addition to scientific articles, popular articles of general interest and advertising were to be included. The first quarterly issue was published in May 2014, and for the first time the publication included articles naming new taxa. In 2018, the peer-review board consisted of over twenty professional malacologists worldwide. However, some professional malacologists have disputed its peer-review status; (Note: "Nearly all taxa were described in self-published books and non-peer-reviewed journals.") a number of new taxa described in its issues by one prolific contributor have subsequently been synonymized, usurped, or otherwise characterized as "taxonomic vandalism".

== Special supplements up to 2009 ==
Occasionally, The Festivus has published special issues, and book-like "Special Supplements".
