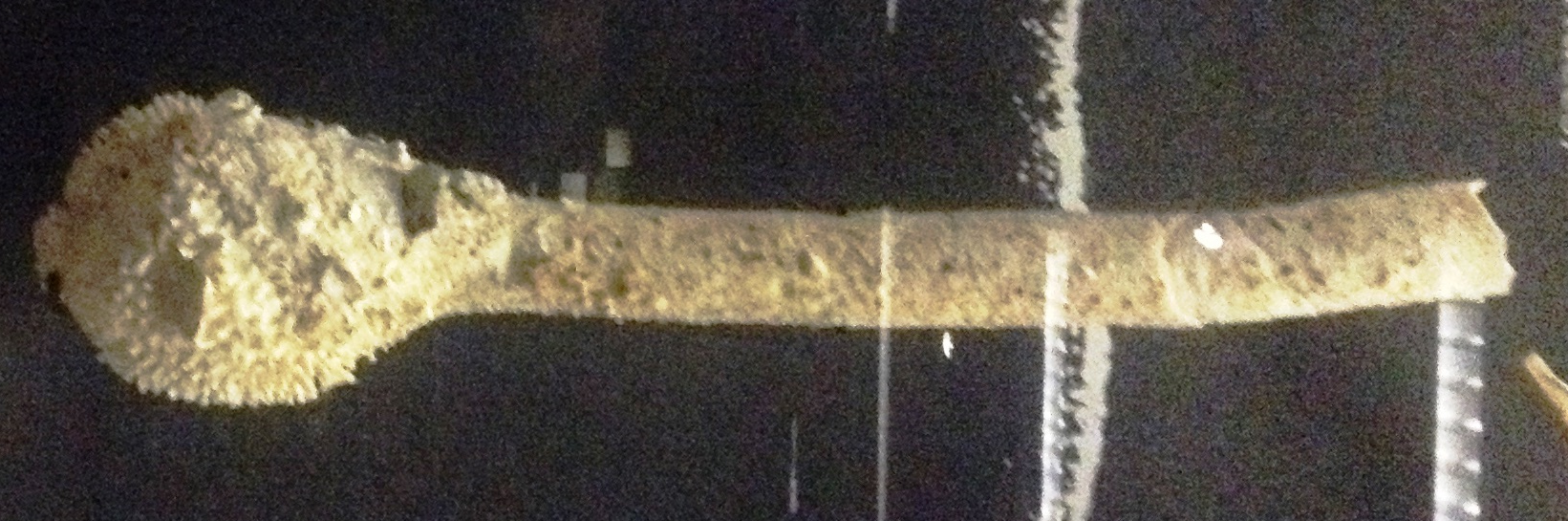
- Brechites attrahens, a species of the family Clavagellidae

Scientific classification
- Kingdom: Animalia
- Phylum: Mollusca
- Class: Bivalvia
- Superfamily: Clavagelloidea
- Family: Clavagellidae d'Orbigny, 1843

Genera
- See text

= Clavagellidae =

Clavagellidae Temporal range: 83.5–0 Ma

Family of bivalves

Clavagellidae is a family of very unusual marine bivalves of the order Anomalodesmata.

== Genera and species ==
- †Ascaulocardium Pojeta and N. F 1987
- Brechites Guettard 1770
  - Brechites attrahens
  - Brechites brechites
  - Brechites dichotomus
  - Brechites giganteus
  - Brechites javanus
  - Brechites penis (Linnaeus, 1758)
  - Brechites philippinensis (Chenu, 1842)
  - Brechites pulchrum
  - Brechites pyriformis
  - Brechites radix (Gray, 1858)
  - Brechites ramosus
  - Brechites sparsus
  - Brechites strangulatus
  - Brechites vaginiferus (Lamarck, 1818)
  - Brechites veitchi
- Clavagella Blainville 1817
- Humphreyia Gray 1858
- Penicillus Bruguière 1789
- †Stirpulina Stoliczka 1870
