= Apertifusus caparti =

Scientific classification
- Kingdom: Animalia
- Phylum: Mollusca
- Class: Gastropoda
- Subclass: Caenogastropoda
- Order: Neogastropoda
- Family: Fasciolariidae
- Genus: Apertifusus
- Species: A. caparti

Binomial name
- Apertifusus caparti (Adam & Knudsen, 1950)

Synonyms
- Fusinus caparti (Adam & Knudsen, 1955); Fusus caparti Adam & Knudsen, 1955

Species of gastropod

Apertifusus caparti is a species of sea snail, a marine gastropod mollusc in the family Fasciolariidae, the spindle snails, the tulip snails and their allies.
