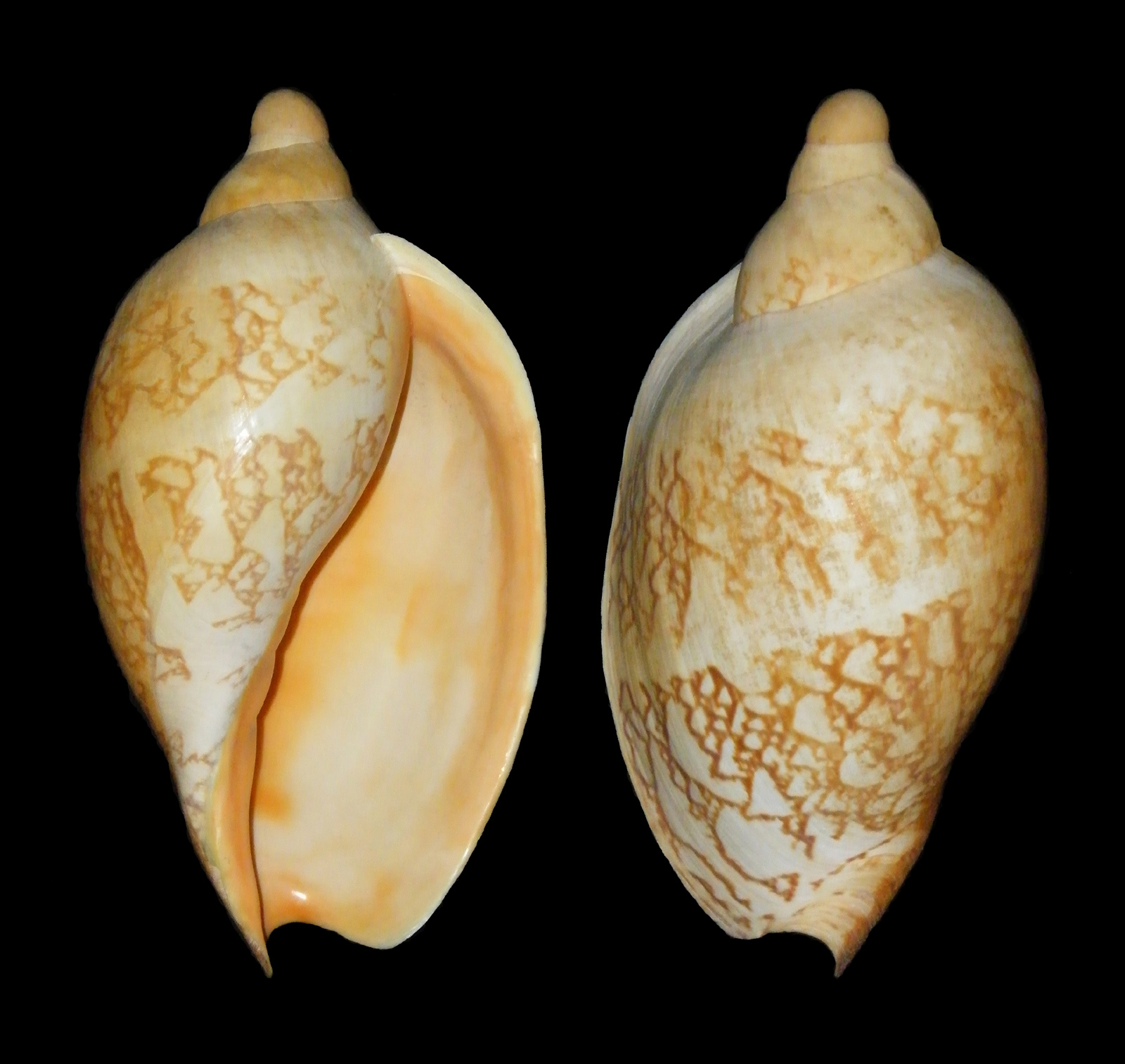
- Shells of Livonia mammilla

Scientific classification
- Kingdom: Animalia
- Phylum: Mollusca
- Class: Gastropoda
- Subclass: Caenogastropoda
- Order: Neogastropoda
- Family: Volutidae
- Genus: Livonia
- Species: L. mammilla

Binomial name
- Livonia mammilla (Sowerby I, 1844)

Synonyms
- Voluta mammilla G.B. Sowerby I, 1844 (basionym)

= Livonia mammilla =

Species of gastropod

Livonia mammilla, common name false melon or false baler, is a species of sea snail, a marine gastropod mollusk of the genus Livonia in the family Volutidae, the volutes.

== Distribution ==
This marine species occurs off South East Australia from Western Victoria to New South Wales, Southern Queensland and Tasmania.

== Description ==
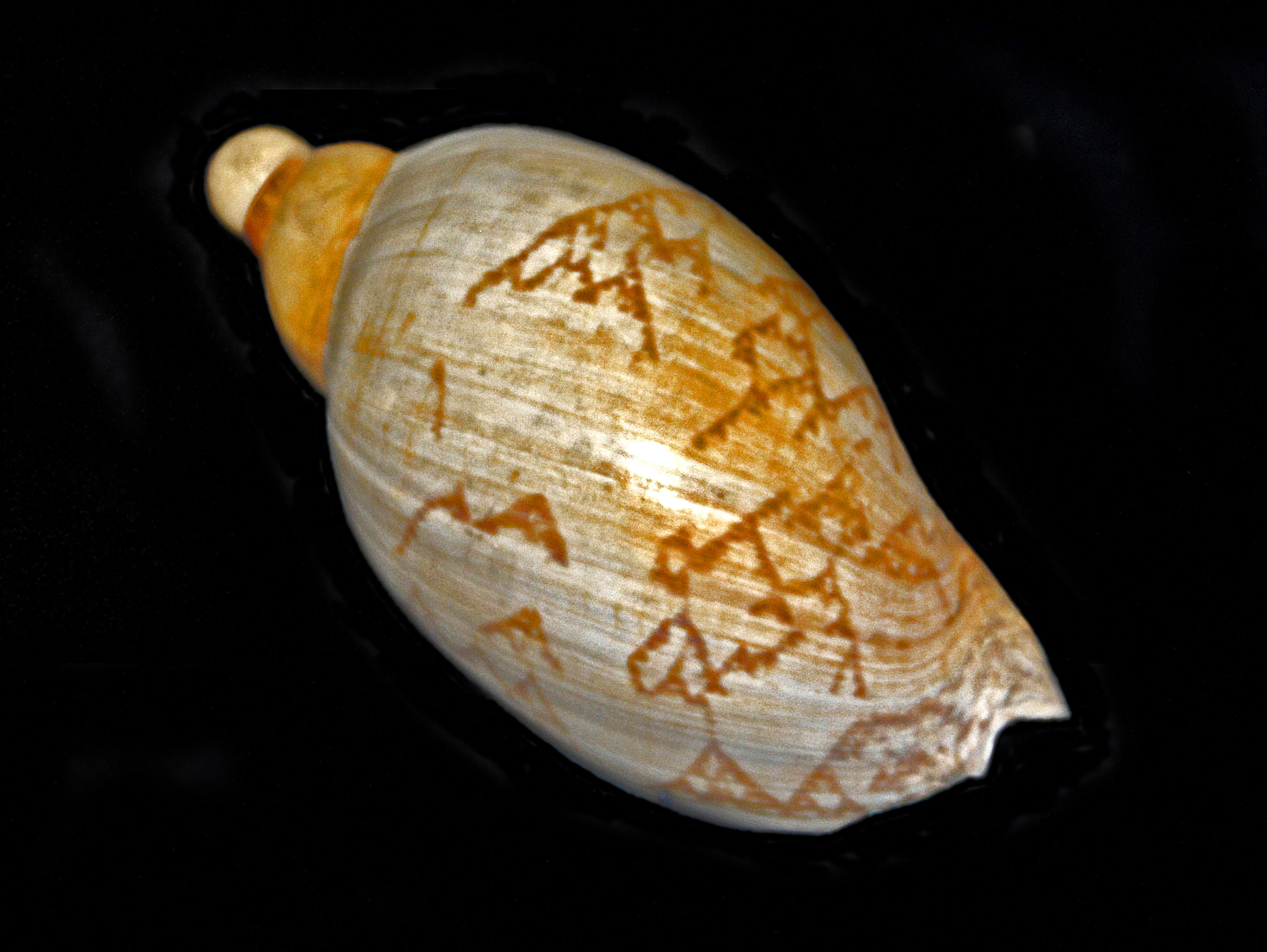
A shell of Livonia mammilla

Shells of Livonia mammilla can reach a size of 100–303 millimetres (3.9–11.9 in). These large shells are characterized by a greatly swollen apex and a lightweight protoconch with a diameter of about 20 millimetres (0.79 in). Whorls are smooth and rounded, with axial growth lines and weak spiral grooves on the top of the body whorl. Columella shows four plaits and the outer lip is smooth and flared outwards. The background colour is yellowish-brown or cream, while the inner edge of outer lip may be white or orange. Body whorl usually has two wide spiral bands of axial zigzag brown lines, but this pattern is variable.

The distinctive patterns on the shell are produced by a process analogous to a linear cellular automaton and can accordingly resemble fractal shapes like the Sierpinski gasket.

== Habitat ==
These moderately common sea snails live in subtidal waters and offshore on sand and mud, at depths of 73 to 457 m., emerging at night to feed.

== Bibliography ==
- A.G. Hinton – Guide to Australian Shells
- Allan, J.K. 1950. Australian Shells: with related animals living in the sea, in freshwater and on the land. Melbourne : Georgian House
- Bail, P & Poppe, G. T. 2001. A conchological iconography: a taxonomic introduction of the recent Volutidae. Hackenheim-Conchbook, 30 pp, 5 pl.
- Barry Wilson – Australian Marine Shells Part 2
- Harald Douté, M. A. Fontana Angioy – Volutes, The Doute collection
- Macpherson, J.H. & Gabriel, C.J. 1962. Marine Molluscs of Victoria. Melbourne : Melbourne University Press & National Museum of Victoria
