= Domínguez =

Domínguez ([doˈmiŋɡeθ] in Peninsular Spanish or [doˈmiŋɡes] elsewhere) is a name of Spanish origin, meaning "son of Domingo". The surname is usually written without the accent in the Philippines and the United States.

== Geographical distribution ==
As of 2014, 40.7% of all known bearers of the surname Domínguez were residents of Mexico (frequency 1:242), 12.8% of Spain (1:288), 8.5% of Argentina (1:396), 7.7% of the United States (1:3,721), 4.3% of Cuba (1:212), 3.2% of Colombia (1:1,186), 3.0% of Peru (1:831), 2.6% of Venezuela (1:904), 2.6% of Honduras (1:265), 2.4% of Paraguay (1:241), 2.0% of the Dominican Republic (1:412), 2.0% of the Philippines (1:4,049), 1.5% of Panama (1:214), 1.2% of Ecuador (1:1,028), 1.0% of Guatemala (1:1,243) and 1.0% of El Salvador (1:500).

In Spain, the frequency of the surname was higher than national average (1:288) in the following autonomous communities:

1. Extremadura (1:131)
2. Galicia (1:136)
3. Andalusia (1:172)
4. Canary Islands (1:179)
5. Castile and León (1:222)
6. Ceuta (1:284)

In Cuba, the frequency of the surname was higher than national average (1:212) in the following provinces:

1. Sancti Spíritus Province (1:122)
2. Matanzas Province (1:133)
3. Artemisa Province (1:155)
4. Holguín Province (1:156)
5. Pinar del Río Province (1:194)

== People ==
- Adolfo Domínguez (born 1950), Spanish fashion designer
- Alejandro Domínguez (disambiguation), several people
- Alberto Domínguez (disambiguation), several people
- Alfonso Martínez Domínguez (1922–2002), Mexican politician, mayor of Mexico City, 1970–71
- Álvaro Domínguez (disambiguation), several people
- Carlos Dominguez (disambiguation), several people
- Clemente Domínguez y Gómez (1946–2005), Spanish churchman, pope of the Palmarian Catholic Church
- Cinthya Domínguez (born 1982), Mexican weightlifter
- Delia Domínguez (1931–2022), Chilean poet
- Diego Domínguez (disambiguation), several people
- Federico Domínguez (disambiguation), several people
- Francisco Atanasio Domínguez (18th century), Franciscan missionary and explorer in North America
- Francisco Serrano y Domínguez, Duke de la Torre (1810–1885), Spanish marshal and statesman
- Gonzalo Domínguez (1925–2017), Chilean alpine skier
- Jasson Domínguez (born 2003), Dominican Republic professional baseball player
- Josefa Ortiz de Domínguez (1768–1829), Mexican conspirator
- José Dominguez, Portuguese football player
- Juan Dominguez y Valdez, Texan governor
- Juanjo Domínguez (contemporary), Argentine classical guitarist
- Leinier Domínguez (born 1983), Cuban chess grandmaster
- Lourdes Domínguez Lino (born 1981), Spanish tennis player
- Maria Alicia Dominguez (1904–1988), Argentine poet, essayist
- Mario Domínguez (disambiguation), several people
- Marta Domínguez (born 1975), Spanish track athlete in the 3000-meter and 5000-meter events
- Matt Dominguez (born 1978), American football player in the Canadian Football League
- Manuel Domínguez (disambiguation), several people
- Melo Dominguez (born 1978), American artist
- Miguel Domínguez (1756–1830), Mexican official; corregidor of Querétaro
- Michael L. Dominguez, U.S. Department of Defense official
- Nora Domínguez (born 1951), Argentine literary and feminist academic
- Nuria Domínguez (born 1974), Spanish rower
- Oralia Domínguez (1925–2013), Mexican mezzo-soprano
- Óscar Domínguez (1906–1957), Spanish surrealist painter
- Pete Dominguez, American basketball coach
- Ramon Domínguez (born 1976), Venezuelan jockey, National Museum of Racing and Hall of Fame inductee (2016)
- Raúl Domínguez (disambiguation), several people
- Ricardo Domínguez, Mexican boxer
- Ricardo Dominguez (artist and professor), American professor and electronic activist
- Richard Dominguez (born 1960), American comic book artist and illustrator
- Ron Dominguez (contemporary), former vice-president of Walt Disney Attractions
- Rosalba Dominguez, American politician
- Rubén Domínguez (disambiguation), several people
- Sally Dominguez (born 1969), Australian inventor
- Seranthony Domínguez (born 1994), Dominican major league baseball pitcher
- Sophia Dominguez-Heithoff (born 2000), American model and beauty pageant titleholder
- Wade Dominguez (1966–1998) American actor, model and singer
- Yulieth Domínguez, Colombian footballer

== Fictional characters ==
- Kristen Forrester Dominguez, in the American soap opera The Bold and the Beautiful
