= Mello (surname) =

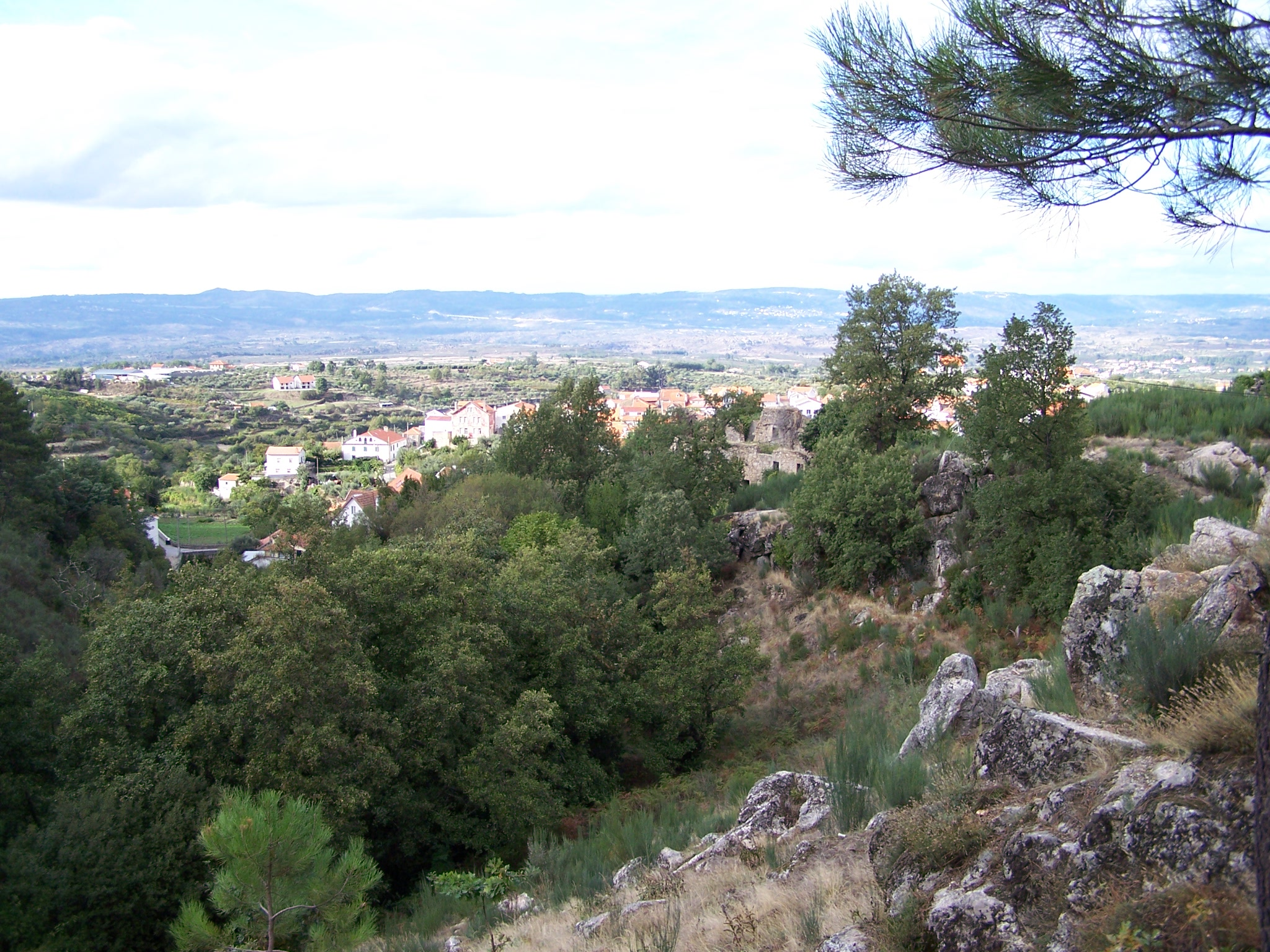
Melo, located in Northern Portugal

Mello or Melo is a Portuguese surname. It indicates a place name, likely derived from a town or village called Melo, in Portugal. The countries with the highest number are Brazil, Portugal and the United States.

Brazil, a former Portuguese colony, received the majority of Portuguese immigrants and is the country with the largest number of people with the surname.

Mello is a surname that was first found in Ile-de-France, at Mellun. The first records of the name was Robert of Melun (c. 1100–1167), an English-born, scholastic Christian theologian.

The Mello surname can also be of Italian, Dutch, and or Belgian origins due to migration. In some families, the Portuguese surname Melo has evolved into Mello, due to migration and differing transcriptions.

== People with the surname ==
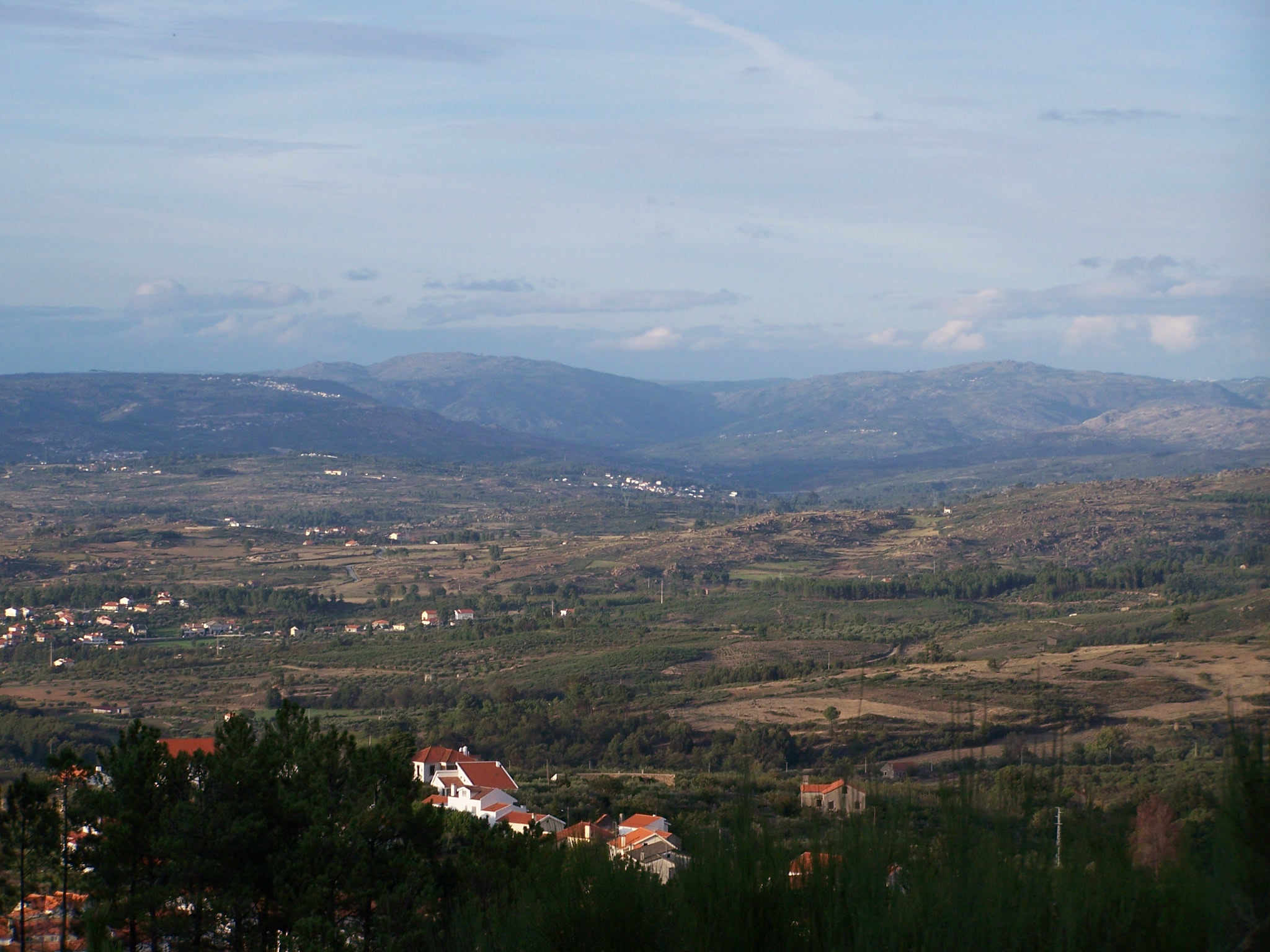
Melo and Serra da Estrela, the highest mountain range in Continental Portugal

- Mello (footballer, born 1992), Brazilian footballer
- Alejandro Mello (born 1979), Uruguayan footballer who plays as a forward. Alfred Mello Music producer from South Africa in Matlelerekeng
- Anna Vania Mello (born 1979), Italian volleyball player
- Anthony de Mello (cricket administrator) (1900–1961), Indian cricket administrator
- Anthony de Mello (Jesuit priest) (1931–1987), Jesuit priest, psychotherapist and writer
- Beevan D'Mello (born 1987), Indian footballer
- Branco Mello (born 1962), Brazilian rock singer/bassist
- Craig Mello (born 1960), Nobel Prize winner
- Danton Mello (born 1975), Brazilian actor, voice actor and comedian
- Dave Mello (born 1969), American drummer of the punk/ska band Operation Ivy
- Dawn Mello (1931–2020), American fashion retail executive
- Dom Francisco Manuel de Mello (1608– 1666), Portuguese writer
- Doug Mello, American soccer coach
- Evaldo Cabral de Mello (born 1936), Brazilian historian and history writer
- Fábio Jerônimo Mello (born 1971), Brazilian footballer
- Fábio Mello (born 1975), Brazilian mixed martial artist
- Fernando Collor de Mello (born 1949), 32nd president of Brazil
- Francisco de Mello, Marquis of Terceira, Portuguese politician
- Froilano de Mello (1887–1955), Goan microbiologist, professor, author and MP in the Portuguese Parliament
- Georgina Mello (1953–2023), Cape Verdean economist and director-general of the Community of Portuguese Language Countries
- Ingeborg Mello (1919–2009), Argentine track and field athlete
- Jeffrey Mello, American Episcopal priest (Bishop of Connecticut)
- Jim Mello (1920–2006), American football player
- José Celso de Mello Filho (born 1945), Brazilian jurist
- Kevin J. Mello (born 1960), American Musician and composer credits include multiple television shows
- Lois Snowe-Mello (1948–2016), American politician
- Marco Aurélio Mello (born 1945), Brazilian jurist
- Michelle Mello, American health law scholar
- Paola Mello (born 1958), Italian computer scientist
- Pedro Collor de Mello (1952–1994), Brazilian politician
- Raphael Mello (born 1992), Brazilian football player for FC Cesarense
- Ricardo Mello (born 1980), Brazilian tennis player
- Selton Mello (born 1972), Brazilian actor, voice actor, screenwriter, producer, editor and director
- Sérgio Vieira de Mello (1948–2003), Brazilian United Nations employee
- Sheila Mello (born 1978), Brazilian dancer, actress and model
- Sophia de Mello Breyner Andresen (1919–2004), Portuguese writer
- Suzanne D'Mello (born 1978), Indian singer
- Tamara Mello (born 1976), American actress
- Timothy J. Mello (born 1956), American mobster
- Zélia Cardoso de Mello (born 1953), Brazilian economist

== See also ==
- Melo (surname)
