= Melo =

Melo may refer to:

People:

- Melo (nickname)
- Melo (surname), a Portuguese surname
- Melo (Italian) or Melus of Bari, 11th century Apulian aristocrat

Places:

- Melo, Córdoba, a settlement in the Presidente Roque Sáenz Peña Department, Argentina
- Melo, Uruguay, the capital city of the Cerro Largo Department of north-eastern Uruguay
  - Roman Catholic Diocese of Melo, Uruguay
- Melo, a parish of Gouveia Municipality, Portugal
- Melo Island in Guinea-Bissau, West Africa

Other uses:

- Mélo (play), a 1929 play by Henri Bernstein
- Mélo (film), a 1986 French romantic drama film, based on the play
- Melo language, spoken in Ethiopia
- Melo (gastropod), a genus of very large sea snails
- Cucumis or melo, a genus of twining, tendril-bearing plants

== See also ==
- Mello (disambiguation)
- Mellow (disambiguation)
