= Mellow =

Mellow may refer to:

- Mellow (surname)
- Mellow (Maria Mena album), 2004
- Mellow (Donovan album), 1997
- Mellow (Sonny Stitt album), 1975
- Mellow (Houston Person album), 2010
- "Mellow", a song by Elton John from his 1972 album Honky Château
- Mellow 947, a Philippine radio station

== See also ==
- Mello (disambiguation)
- Melo (disambiguation)
- "Mellow Yellow", a 1966 song by Donovan
- Mellow Yellow (disambiguation)
