= Baler (disambiguation) =

A baler is a piece of farm machinery. Baler may also refer to:

- Baler, Aurora, a municipality in Aurora, Philippines
- Baler (film), a 2008 film
- Baler, or Baler shell, a sea snail in the genus Melo

== See also ==
- Bailer
