= Mélo =

Mélo may refer to:

- Mélo (play), a 1929 play by Henri Bernstein
- Mélo, a 1932 French-language film adaptation of the play, co-produced with Dreaming Lips, a German-language adaptation
- Mélo (film), a 1986 French adaptation of the play
- Mélo, a 2022 album by Tiakola

== See also ==
- Melo (disambiguation)
