= 1930s in Angola =

Angola-related events during the 1930's

In the 1930s in Angola the Portuguese colonial government of António de Oliveira Salazar cut spending on colonization, leading to less emigration to Angola and a decline in the population of Portuguese Angolans.

The Portuguese government passed the Colonial Act in May 1930, centralizing the empire's administration and limiting the power of governor-generals. The settler population in Angola grew from 30,000 in May 1930 to 59,000 in 1931, but declined to 44,000 by 1940. By 1961 however, when the war for independence began, the population had risen to 170,000.

In 1930, Portugal's ambassador to Denmark wrote to his superiors, informing them that Angolan separatists had participated in the Sixth Comintern Congress in Moscow, Soviet Union from July–August 1928. L'Ami du peuple, a French newspaper, reported that a "Negro from the Portuguese colony of Angola... announced with a cannibalistic smile that when the hour of their liberation sounded, the black proletariat would know how to exact an unforgettable vengeance [on] the white colonists."

== Economy ==
In the 1930s, the Salazar government instituted tariffs on Angola to limit investment from Portugal's colonial competitors while investing in Angola's infrastructure to increase exports to Portugal. Angolans completed the construction of the Benguela railway in 1929 and opened it to transportation in 1931. The railway facilitated the exportation of minerals mined in Belgian-ruled Katanga through Angola's western ports. The South African Oppenheimer Trust produced and exported Angolan diamonds, making the diamond industry a vital part of Angola's economy for the first time in the 1930s. Angolans exported 11,839 tons of coffee in 1930, exceeding the previous annual export record of 11,066 tons in 1895. Salazar selected one factory in Angola to produce industrial alcohol in 1932. The factory, competing only with a selected factory in colonial Mozambique, derived its alcohol from molasses and diluted the product with petroleum to maximize its utility. Unfortunately, drought and locusts in 1934 compounded the effects of the Great Depression. Natives, unable to pay the colonists' tax of US$3.80, faced forced conscription and enslavement. Many farmers, indebted to settlers, auctioned their daughters for sexual slavery. British Consul General Smallbones explicitly labeled and condemned Portugal's conscription policy as slavery in 1930. Portugal's Governor-General for Angola and the minister of colonies denied the charge and Salazar maintained the policy.

== Colonial governors ==
1. Filomeno da Câmara Melo Cabral, High Commissioner of Angola (1929-1930)
2. José Dionísio Carneiro de Sousa e Faro, High Commissioner of Angola (1930-1931)
3. Eduardo Ferreira Viana, High Commissioner of Angola (1931–1934)
4. Júlio Garcês de Lencastre, High Commissioner of Angola (1934-1935)
5. António Lopes Matheus, High Commissioner of Angola (1935-1939)
6. Manoel da Cunha e Costa Marquês Mano, High Commissioner of Angola (1939-1941)

== See also ==
- Portuguese West Africa
