= Jamila Lyiscott =

American social justice scholar and poet

Jamila Lyiscott is an American scholar and writer. She is assistant professor of social justice education and co-founder of the Center of Racial Justice and Youth Engaged Research at University of Massachusetts Amherst.

== Early life and education ==
Lyiscott's parents are from Trinidad and she grew up in the United States, in Crown Heights, Brooklyn, New York City. She has an MA in Black literature from Hunter College (2010) and a PhD from Teachers College, Columbia University (2015). Her MA thesis was "False positive freedom" and her doctoral thesis was "How Broken English Made Me Whole: Exploring Race, New Literacies, and Social Justice Within a Youth Participatory Action Research Framework".

== Career ==
Lyiscott gave a TED talk in 2014, "3 ways to speak English", about her experience of being disrespected as a speaker of Trinidadian and Black American English. This talk has been viewed more than 5 million times. She gave TEDx talk "Why English Class is Silencing Students of Color" in 2018.

She is an editor-in-chief of the journal Equity & Excellence in Education.

In April 2022 she was Michael Rosen's guest on an episode of BBC Radio 4's Word of Mouth.

== Selected publications ==
- Lyiscott, Jamila (2019). Black appetite, white food : issues of race, voice, and justice within and beyond the classroom. New York: Routledge. ISBN 9781138480667.
