= Melo (surname) =

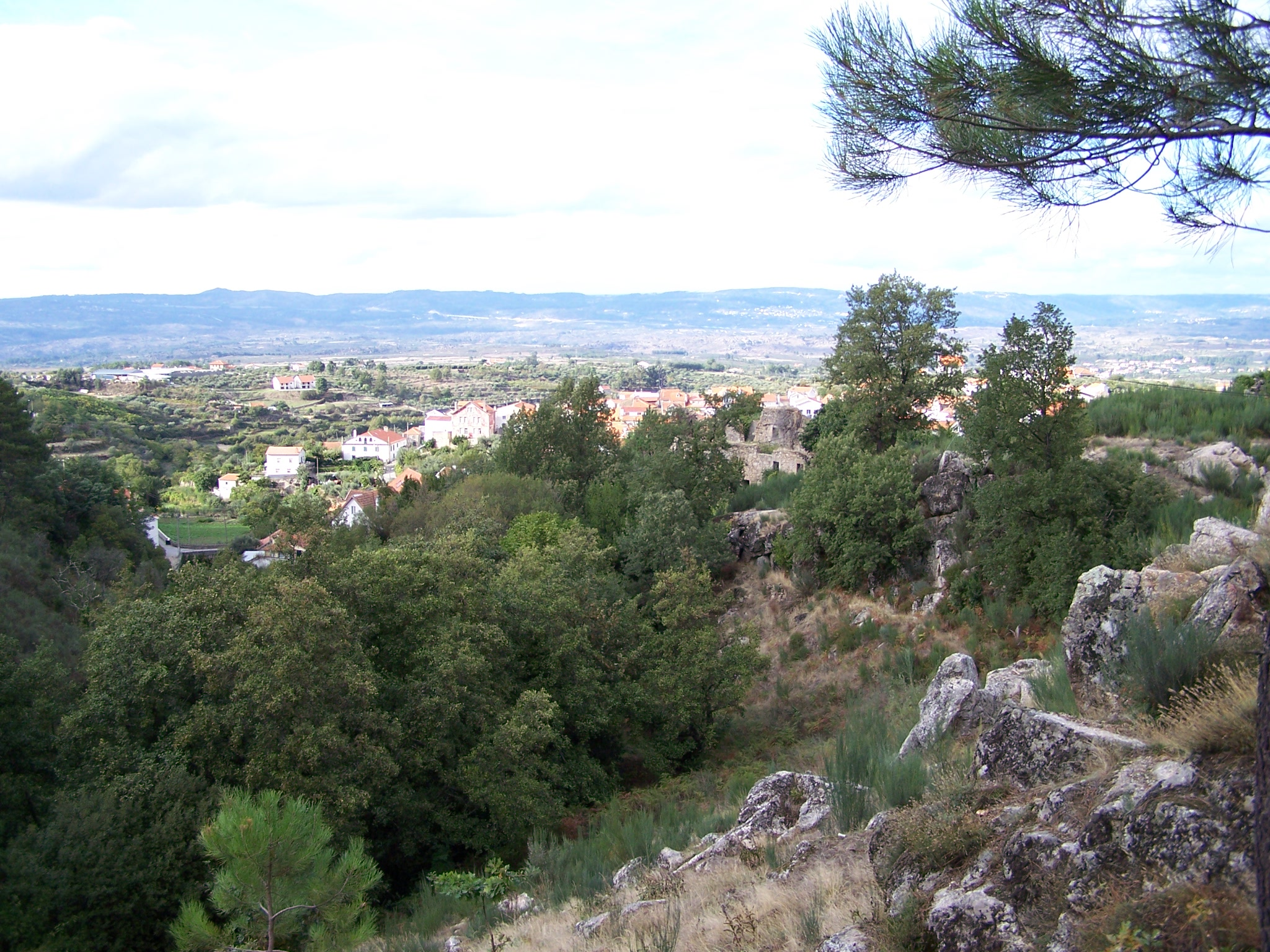
Melo, located in Northern Portugal

Melo or Mello is a Portuguese surname. It indicates a place name, likely derived from a town or village called Melo, in Portugal. The countries with the highest number are Brazil, Portugal and the United States.

Brazil, a former Portuguese colony, received the majority of Portuguese immigrants and is the country with the largest number of people with the surname.

Notable people with the name include:

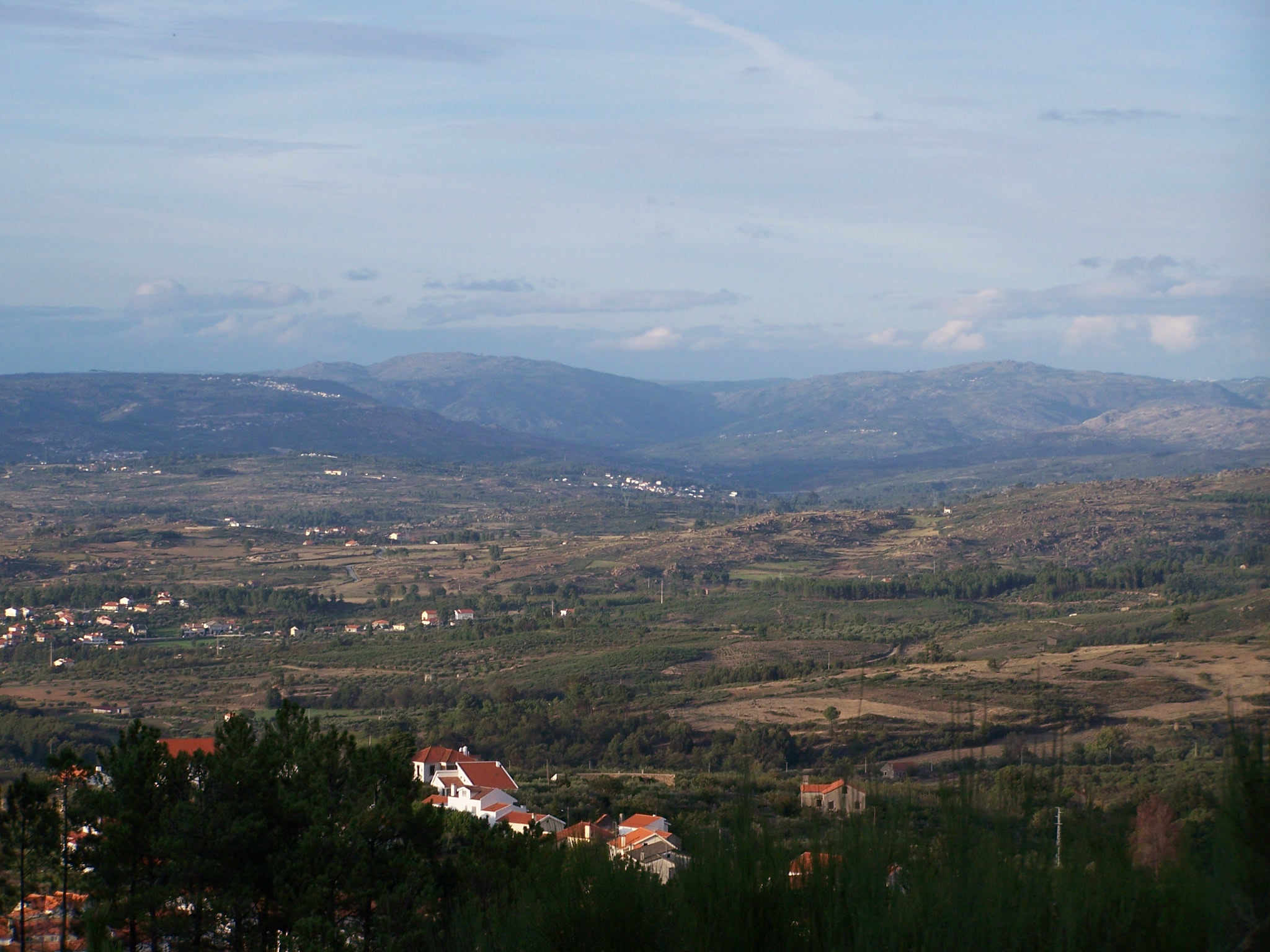
Melo and Serra da Estrela, the highest mountain range in Continental Portugal

- Alejandro Melo (born 1996), Argentine professional footballer
- Andrés Granier Melo (born 1948), Mexican Governor of Tabasco
- António Barbosa de Melo (1932–2016), Portuguese politician and lawyer
- Araquem de Melo (1944–2001), Brazilian footballer
- Carlos Melo (born 1982), Panamanian boxer
- Carlos Galvão de Melo (1921–2008), Portuguese Air Force officer and member of the National Salvation Junta after the 1974 Carnation Revolution
- Custódio José de Melo (1840–1902), Brazilian admiral, who led the Brazilian fleet in two revolts in 1891 and 1893–4.
- Daniel Melo (born 1977), Brazilian former tennis player, brother of Marcelo Melo
- Dylan DeMelo (born 1993), Canadian hockey player
- Dylan De Melo (born 2008), Canadian soccer player
- Eddie Melo (1961–2001), Canadian boxer and gangster
- Ernesto Melo Antunes (1933–1999), Portuguese military officer who played a major role in the Carnation Revolution
- Fabricio "Fab" Paulino de Melo (1990–2017), Brazilian basketball player who played for Syracuse University for two years. He was drafted in 2012 by the Boston Celtics as the 20th pick in the first round of the NBA Draft
- Fatima Moreira de Melo (born 1978), Dutch field hockey player
- Felipe Melo (born 1983), Brazilian footballer
- Flávio de Melo (1965–1992), Brazilian rower
- Fontes Pereira de Melo (1819–1887), Portuguese statesman, politician and engineer
- Francisco de Melo (1597–1651), Portuguese-Spanish general and diplomat
- Francisco Manuel de Mello (1608–1666), Portuguese writer
- Froilano de Mello (1887–1955), Indo-Portuguese microbiologist, medical scientist, professor, author and independent Member of Parliament in the Portuguese parliament
- Gabriel Melo Guevara (1939–2025), Colombian judge and politician
- Gilberto da Silva Melo (born 1976), Brazilian footballer
- Jaime Melo (born 1980), Brazilian racing driver
- Joaquim Melo (born 1949), Portuguese footballer
- Jose Melo (1932–2020), former Associate Justice of the Supreme Court of the Philippines
- José Andrés Pacheco de Melo (1779-c. 1820), Argentine statesman and priest
- José María Melo (1800–1860), Colombian president and general
- José Artur de Melo Júnior (born 1987), Brazilian footballer
- Laudelina de Campos Melo (1904–1991), created the first trade association for domestic workers in Brazil
- Leopoldo Melo (1869–1951), Argentine lawyer, diplomat and politician
- Márcio Melo (1906–1991), Brazilian air force general
- Marcelo Melo (born 1983), Brazilian tennis player
- Pedro de Melo (1734–1797), Spanish soldier and Viceroy of the Rio de la Plata in South America
- Sebastião José de Carvalho e Melo, 1st Marquess of Pombal (1699–1782), Portuguese statesman
- Sérgio Vieira de Mello (1948–2003), Brazilian diplomat
- Suzanne D'Mello, Indian playback singer
- Tay Melo (born 1995 as Taynara Melo de Carvalho), Brazilian professional wrestler and judoka
- Túlio de Melo (born 1985), Brazilian footballer
- Welington de Melo (1946–2016), Brazilian mathematician
- Wélton Araújo Melo (born 1975), Brazilian former footballer
- Zé Marco de Melo (born 1971), Brazilian beach volleyball player and silver medalist at the 2000 Summer Olympics

== See also ==
- Mello (surname)
