= Domínguez (disambiguation) =

Domínguez is a surname of Spanish origin. Domínguez may also refer to:

== Places ==
- Comitán de Domínguez, formal name of the city of Comitán, Chiapas State, Mexico
- California State University, Dominguez Hills, Carson, California, USA
- Dominguez High School, Compton, California, USA
- Dominguez Channel, a 15.7-mile-long (25.3 km) stream in southern Los Angeles County, California.
- Rancho Dominguez, California, a small part of the Spanish land grant Rancho San Pedro from the King of Spain in 1784.

== People ==
- Domínguez (surname)

== Other ==
- Battle of Dominguez Rancho, 1847 military battle of the Mexican-American War
- Belisario Domínguez Medal of Honor, the highest award bestowed by the Mexican government
- United States v. Dominguez Benitez, 2004 decision of the US Supreme Court regarding plea bargains
