= Mello =

Mello may refer to:

== Places ==
- Mello, Lombardy, an Italian commune
- Mello, Oise, French commune
- Mello, Ethiopia, small Ethiopian town

== Other uses ==
- Mello (surname), a surname, for people see there
- Big Mello (1968–2002), American rapper
- Mello (Death Note), the assumed name of Mihael Keehl, a character in the manga and anime Death Note
- Commissioner De Mello, a fictional character portrayed by Satish Shah in the 1983 Indian film Jaane Bhi Do Yaaro
- Melodifestivalen (nicknamed "Mello"), a Swedish music competition determining the country's representative to Eurovision Song Contest
- Mello, mascot of the 2007 Cricket World Cup

== See also ==
- Mellophone, a brass musical instrument
- "Keep It Mello", a song by Marshmello featuring Omar Linx
- P D'Mello Road, a road in Mumbai
- Melo (disambiguation)
- Mellow (disambiguation)
