= Melo ashmorensis =

Scientific classification
- Kingdom: Animalia
- Phylum: Mollusca
- Class: Gastropoda
- Subclass: Caenogastropoda
- Order: Neogastropoda
- Family: Volutidae
- Genus: Melo
- Species: M. ashmorensis

Binomial name
- Melo ashmorensis Morrison, 2005

Species of gastropod

Melo ashmorensis is a species of sea snail, a marine gastropod mollusk in the family Volutidae, the volutes.
