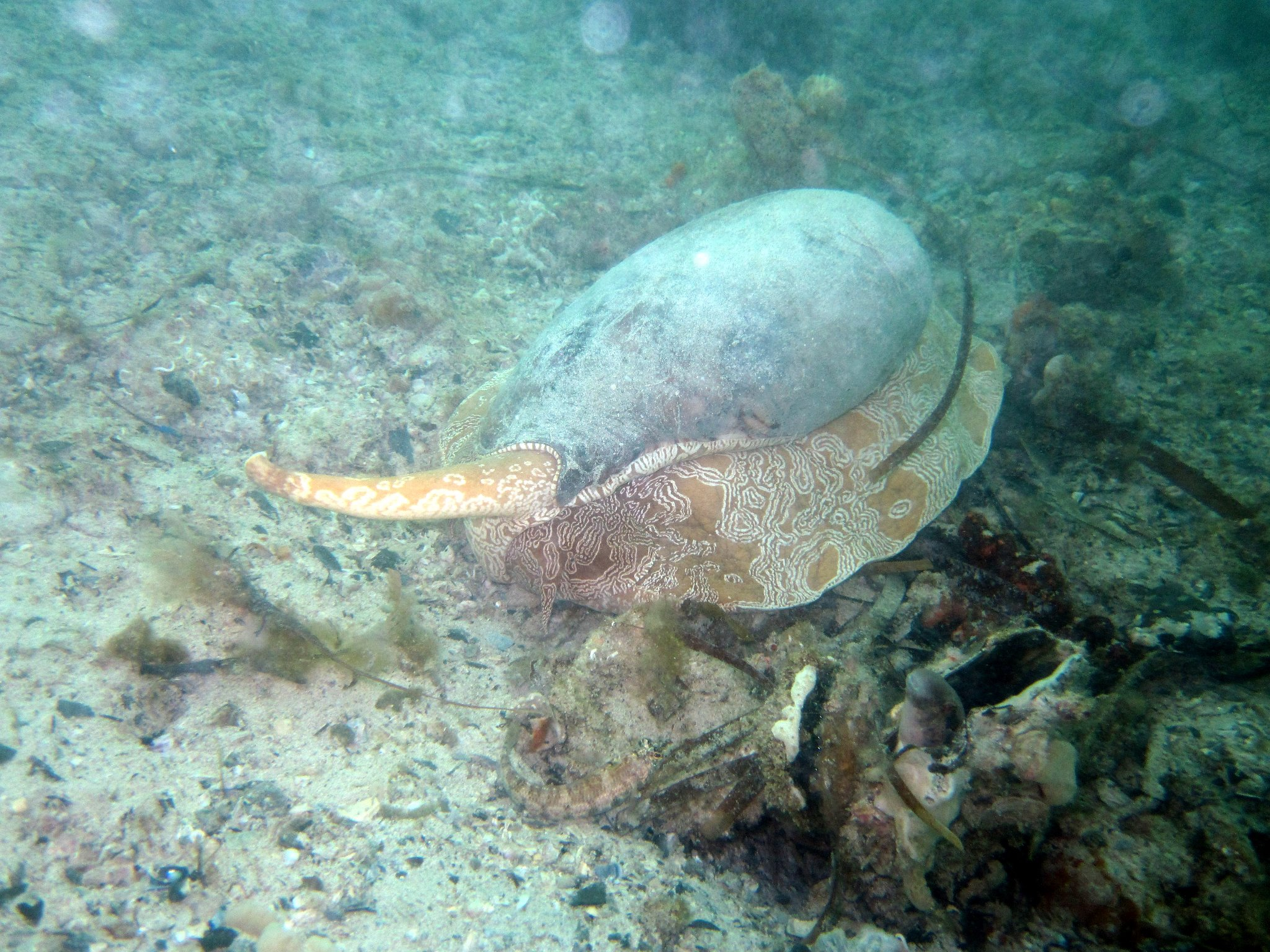
- Southern bailer Melo miltonis

Scientific classification
- Kingdom: Animalia
- Phylum: Mollusca
- Class: Gastropoda
- Subclass: Caenogastropoda
- Order: Neogastropoda
- Family: Volutidae
- Genus: Melo
- Species: M. miltonis

Binomial name
- Melo miltonis (Griffith & Pidgeon, 1834)

= Melo miltonis =

Southern bailer

Species of gastropod

Melo miltonis, the southern bailer or southern baler, is a large sea snail, a marine gastropod mollusc in the family Volutidae, the volutes.

== Distribution ==
This species distribution is restricted to Southwest Australia.

== Habitat ==
This species is found amongst shallow seagrass beds, on sand, and around reefs, at depths up to 20 m (66 ft). The range extends from the Houtman Abrolhos, off the Western Australian coast, to South Australia.

== Shell description ==
The length of this shell can be up to 450 mm (18 in), with distinctive cream and brown markings. Shells of this species have long been used by the peoples of Australia to carry or remove water, hence the common name "bailer", which is also applied to many other volutes in this genus. The foot, which is very large, is also covered in concentric patterns of the same colours as the shell, and is often used to engulf prey.
