= Federico Domínguez =

Federico Domínguez is the name of two footballers:

- Federico Domínguez (footballer, born 1976), defender for Club Atlético Vélez Sarsfield
- Federico Domínguez (footballer, born 1991), midfielder for Nea Salamis Famagusta FC
