= Mario Domínguez =

Mario Domínguez may refer to:

- Mario Domínguez (footballer, born 2004), Spanish footballer
- Mario Domínguez (footballer, born 2009), Spanish footballer
- Mario Domínguez (racing driver) (born 1975), Mexican racing driver
