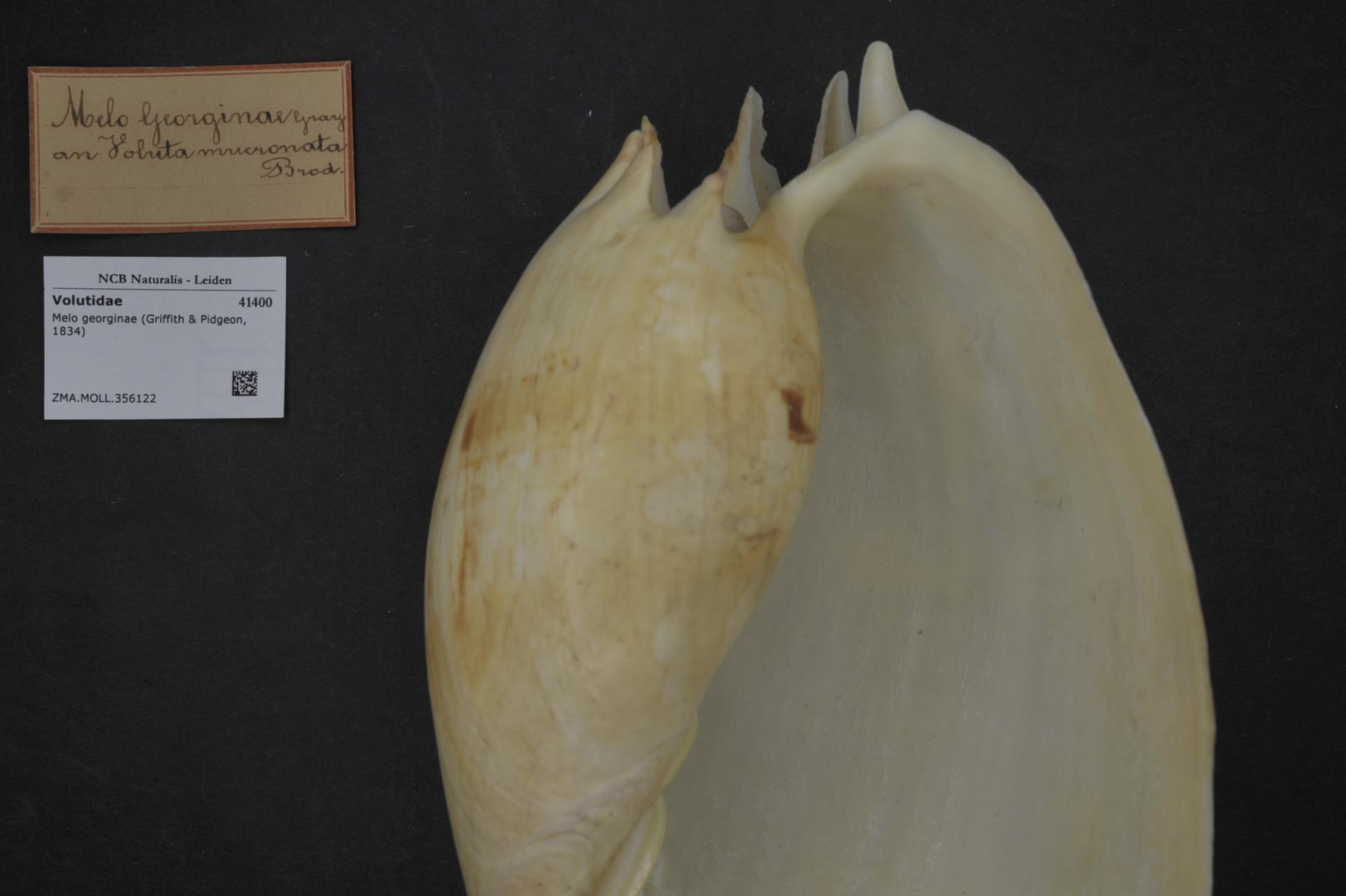

Scientific classification
- Kingdom: Animalia
- Phylum: Mollusca
- Class: Gastropoda
- Subclass: Caenogastropoda
- Order: Neogastropoda
- Family: Volutidae
- Genus: Melo
- Species: M. georginae

Binomial name
- Melo georginae (Griffith & Pidgeon, 1834)

= Melo georginae =

Species of gastropod

Melo georginae is a species of sea snail, a marine gastropod mollusk in the family Volutidae, the volutes.
