= Carlos Dominguez =

Carlos Dominguez (Spanish: Carlos Domínguez) may refer to:

- Carlos Domínguez (weightlifter) (1922–2008), Peruvian weightlifter
- Carlos Domínguez Rodríguez (1941–2018), Mexican journalist
- Carlos Dominguez III (born 1945), Filipino businessman
- Carlos María Domínguez (born 1955), Argentine journalist and writer
- Carlos Domínguez (Spanish footballer) (born 2001), Spanish football defender
- Carlos Reales Dominguez (born 2002), suspect in the 2023 Davis, California stabbings
- Carlos Domínguez (Venezuelan footballer)
- "Carlos Dominguez", a song written by Paul Simon in 1963 and released under his pseudonym Paul Kane

== See also ==
- Carlitos (footballer, born 1976), born Carlos Domínguez Domínguez, Spanish football forward
