= Melo (nickname) =

Melo is a nickname. Notable people with the name include:

- Carmelo Anthony (born 1984), American basketball player
- Melo Dominguez (born 1978), American artist
- Melo Trimble (born 1995), American basketball player
- LaMelo Ball (born 2001), American basketball player
