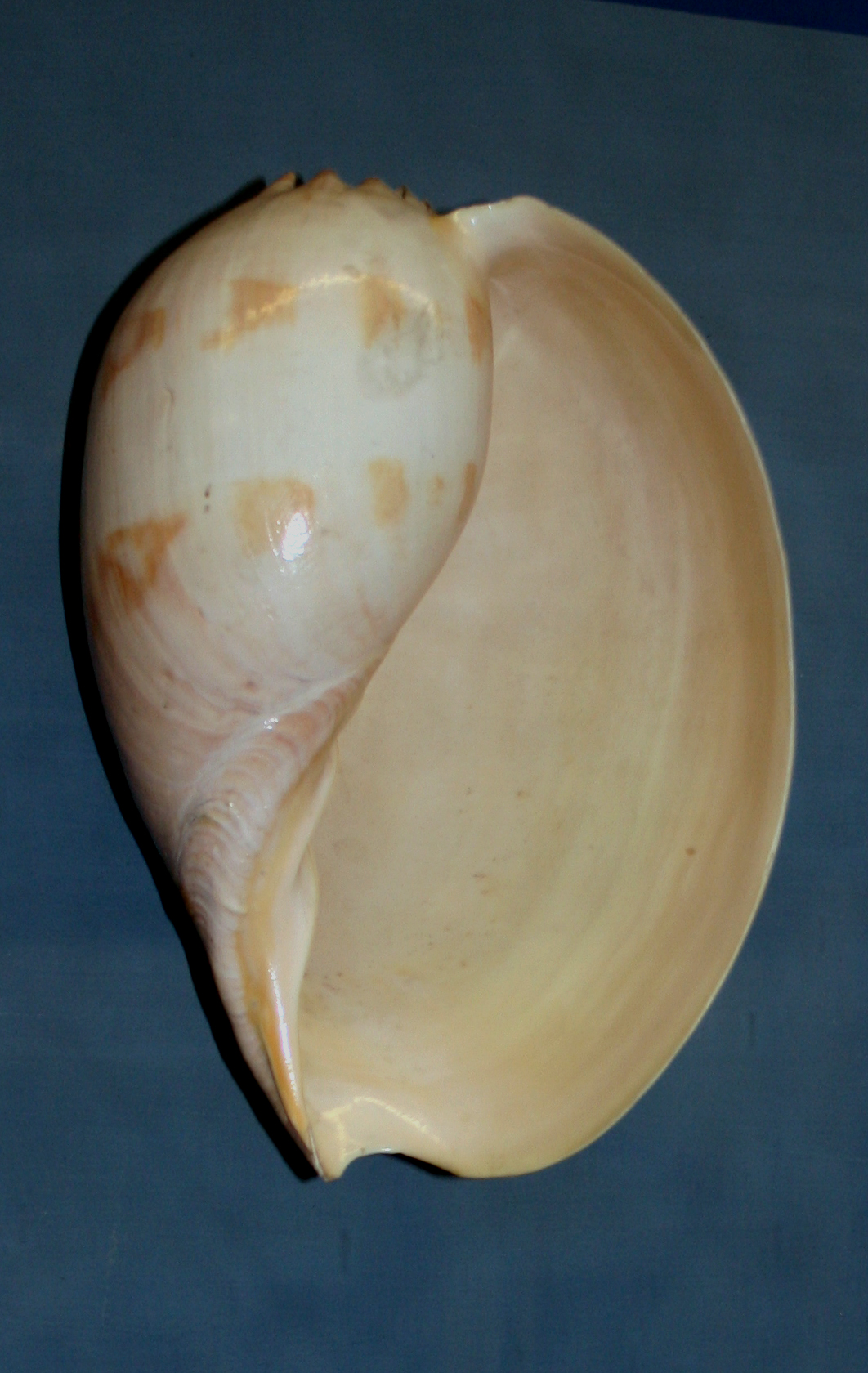
- Apertural view of shell
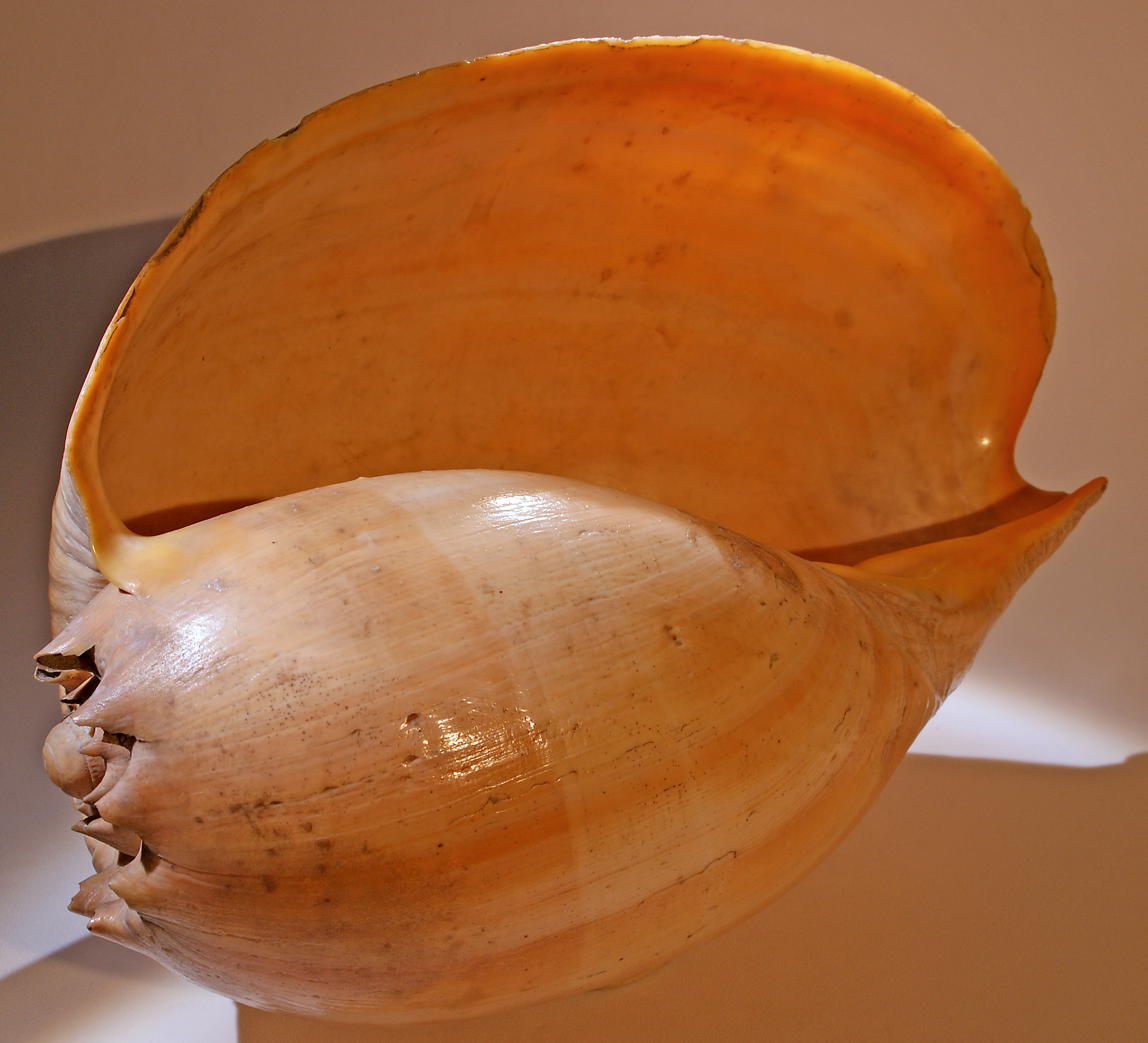
- 23 cm length shell, from the Indian Ocean

Scientific classification
- Kingdom: Animalia
- Phylum: Mollusca
- Class: Gastropoda
- Subclass: Caenogastropoda
- Order: Neogastropoda
- Family: Volutidae
- Genus: Melo
- Species: M. aethiopicus

Binomial name
- Melo aethiopicus (Linnaeus, 1758)

Synonyms
- Cymbium aethiopicum (Linnaeus, 1758); Melo aethiopica (Linnaeus, 1758); Voluta aethiopicum Linnaeus, 1758

= Melo aethiopicus =

Species of gastropod

Melo aethiopicus, common name the crowned baler, is a very large sea snail, a marine gastropod mollusc in the family Volutidae, the volutes.

== Distribution ==
"Lesser Sunda Islands of Indonesia."

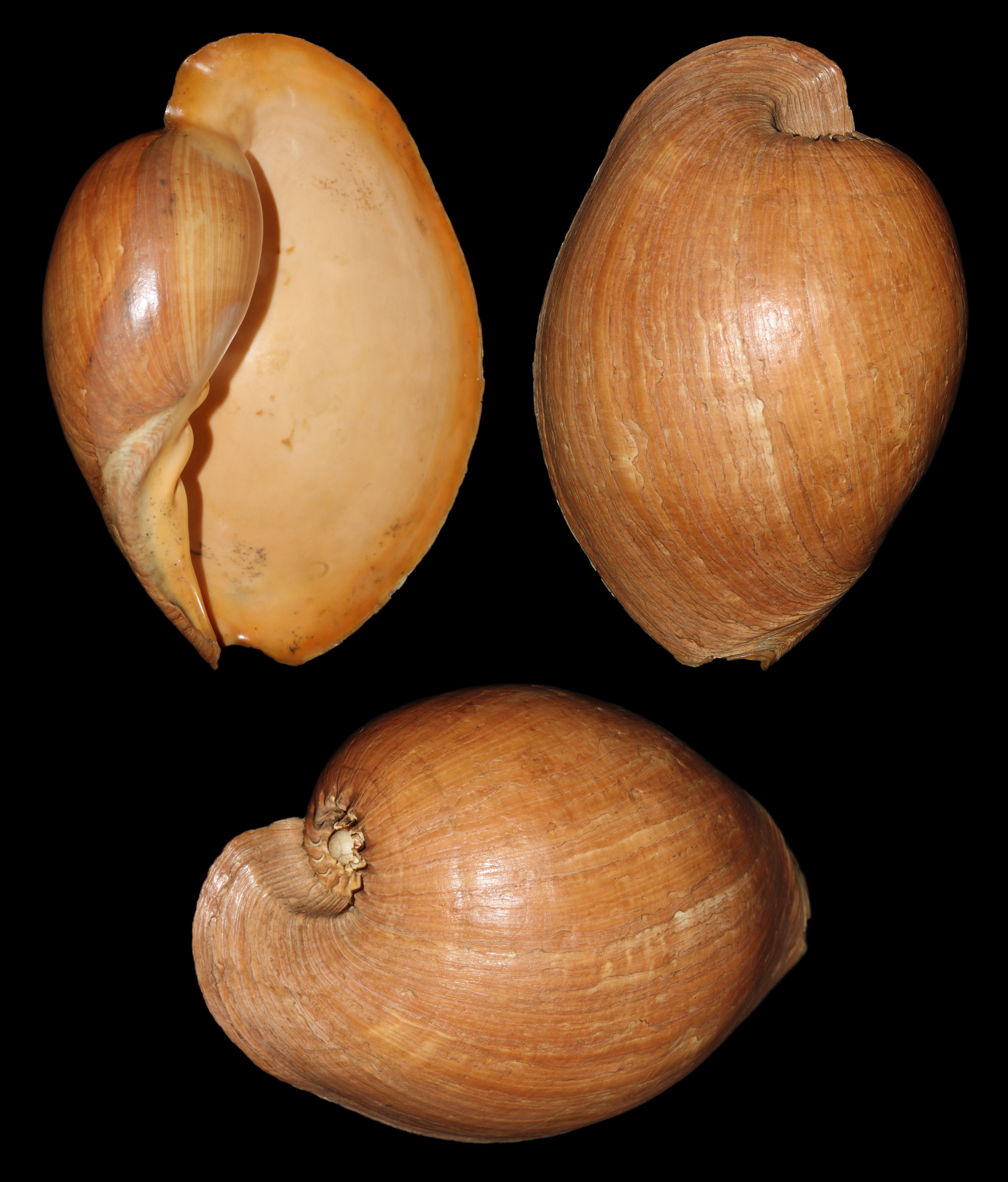
A shell of Melo aethiopica
