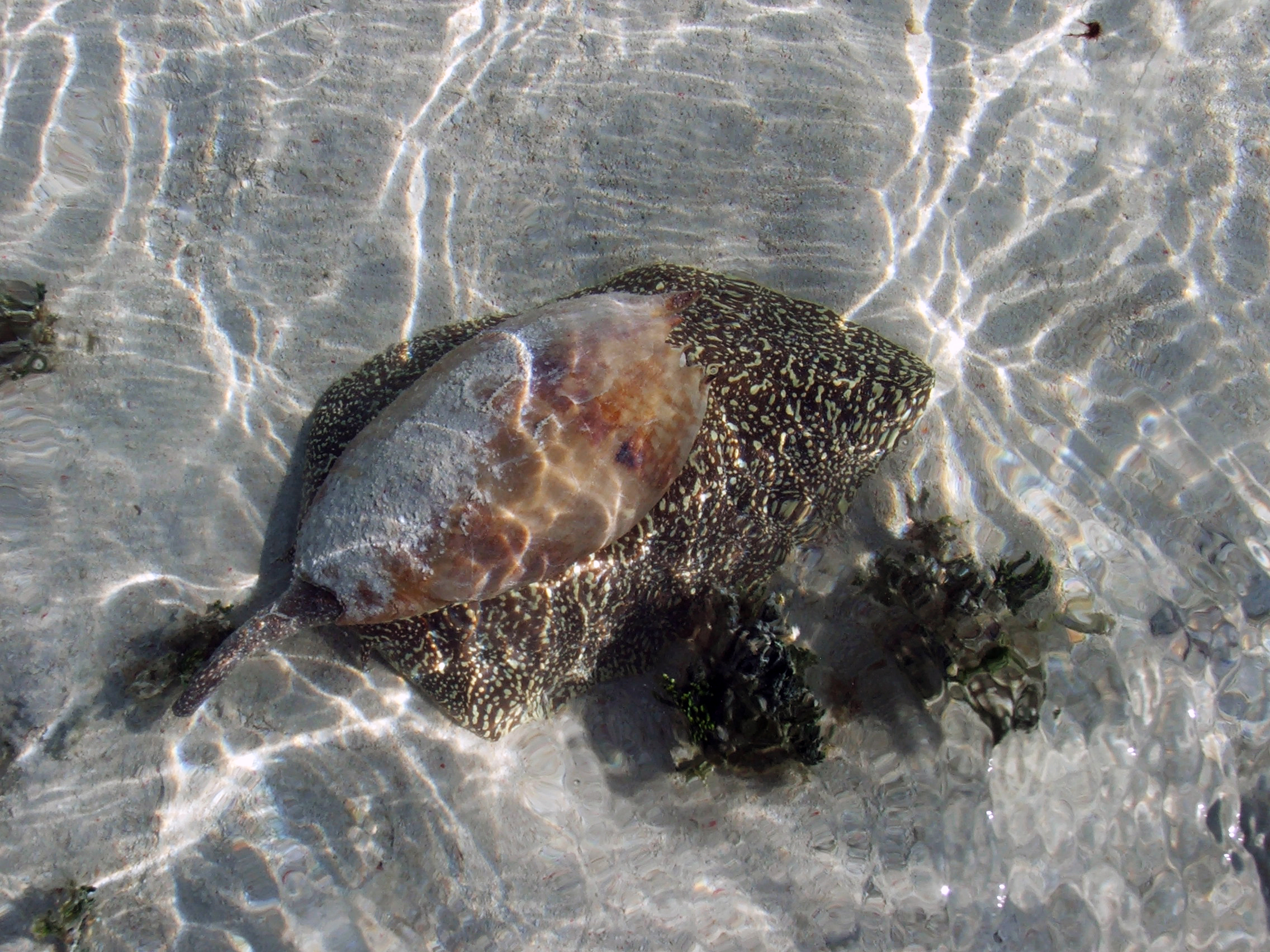
- Moving across the sand at low tide

Scientific classification
- Kingdom: Animalia
- Phylum: Mollusca
- Class: Gastropoda
- Subclass: Caenogastropoda
- Order: Neogastropoda
- Family: Volutidae
- Genus: Melo
- Species: M. amphora

Binomial name
- Melo amphora (Lightfoot, 1786)

Synonyms
- Voluta diadema Lamarck, 1816

= Melo amphora =

Diadem volute

Species of gastropod

Melo amphora (common name: Diadem volute) is a large sea snail, a marine gastropod mollusc in the family Volutidae, the volutes.

== Etymology ==
The specific name amphora is the Latin word for 'vase', derived from the Greek amphoreus (αμφορεύς).

== Distribution ==
This species distribution is restricted to the tropical southwest Pacific, from southern Indonesia and New Guinea to the northern half of Australia.

== Habitat ==
This large sea snail is known to live in littoral and shallow sublittoral zones. It usually dwells in muddy bottoms at a maximum depth of nearly 10 m.

== Shell description ==
The maximum shell length of this species is up to 500 mm, usually around 300 mm.

This large shell has a bulbous or nearly oval outline. Its columella has three easily distinguishable oblique folds. The aperture is wide and near as long as the shell itself, and there is no operculum. It has a very large, inflated and posteriorly expanded body whorl. One of its most striking characteristics is the shoulder with prominent and curved hollow spines. These spines tend to become obsolete in later stages of growth. The spire is usually very short.

The color of the Melo amphora shell is said to be highly variable. It is commonly mainly coloured brown, white, or pale orange. It usually presents spiral darker brown banding. The interior is glazed, and is commonly coloured cream or pinky orange.

== Life habits ==
Video: Giant Baler moving across reef at low tide

=== Feeding ===
Melo amphora is known to be carnivorous. It is usually seen feeding on other volutes, like Zebramoria zebra, and may present cannibalistic behaviour, commonly feeding on smaller conspecific individuals.

== Human use ==
This species' flesh is edible, and commonly used as food by native fishermen. The size and ornamentation of the Melo amphora shell makes it highly regarded as a decorative item. It is also known to be used as a water carrier, and as a bailer for fishing boats (like other species from the Melo genus).
