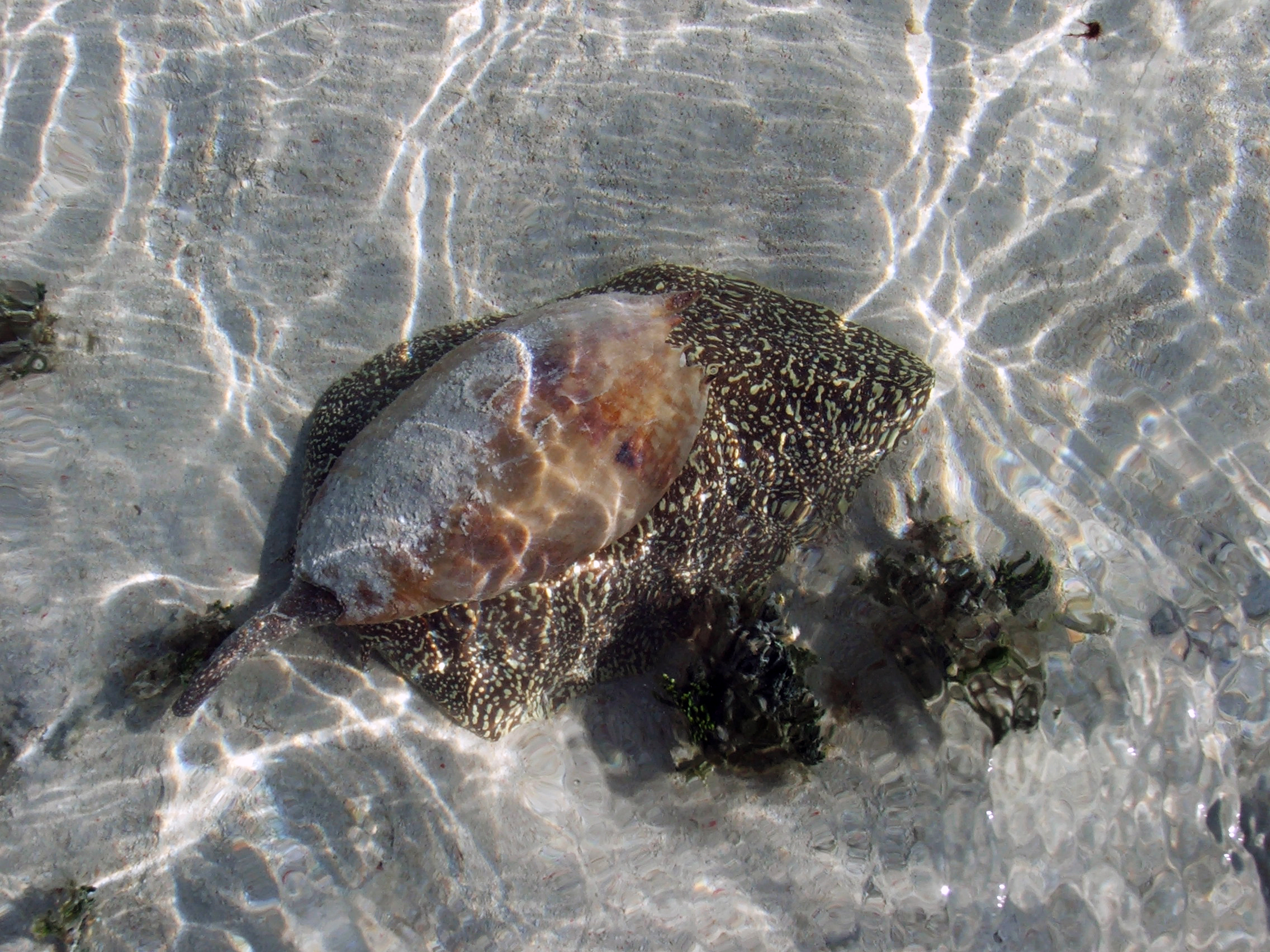
- A live animal of what is probably Melo umbilicatus crawling on the substrate at low tide

Scientific classification
- Kingdom: Animalia
- Phylum: Mollusca
- Class: Gastropoda
- Subclass: Caenogastropoda
- Order: Neogastropoda
- Family: Volutidae
- Genus: Melo
- Species: M. umbilicatus

Binomial name
- Melo umbilicatus (Broderip in Sowerby I, 1826)

= Melo umbilicatus =

Species of gastropod

Melo umbilicatus, common name the heavy baler or umbilicate melon, is a very large sea snail, a marine gastropod mollusc in the family Volutidae, the volutes.
