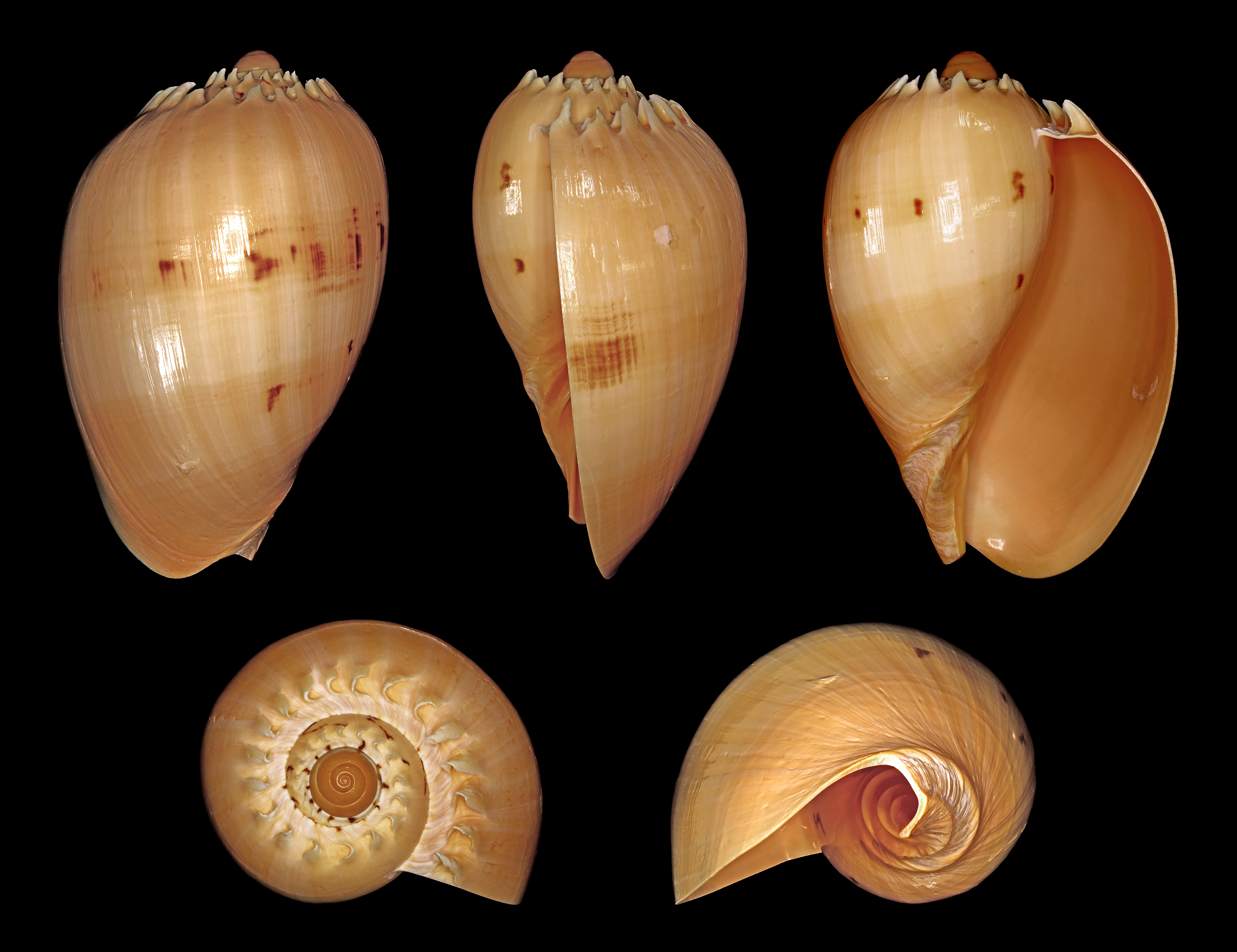
- Five views of a shell of Melo broderipii

Scientific classification
- Kingdom: Animalia
- Phylum: Mollusca
- Class: Gastropoda
- Subclass: Caenogastropoda
- Order: Neogastropoda
- Family: Volutidae
- Genus: Melo
- Species: M. broderipii

Binomial name
- Melo broderipii (Griffith & Pidgeon, 1834)

Synonyms
- Voluta lamarckii Kiener, 1839

= Melo broderipii =

Species of gastropod

Melo broderipii is a species of sea snail, a marine gastropod mollusk in the family Volutidae, the volutes.

== Description ==
Melo broderipii is a large predatory sea snail mostly found in seas around the Philippines. It was first identified and named by Gray. Measurements 90-200-250- 355 mm. One of the largest gastropod snails but not the largest in the Melo species.

Melo broderipii is often referred to as a bailer shell as their shape makes them the perfect canoe bailer. Many tribes in New Guinea and other south pacific islands use the various types of Melo to make jewelry and shell money as well as canoe bailers. The large orange Melo pearls which are sometimes found were treasured especially by royalty in Vietnam in the past.

== Distribution ==
Indo-Pacific region: Philippines.
