= Alex Dominguez =

Alex Dominguez may refer to:

- Alex Dominguez (politician) (born 1970), Texas politician
- Álex Domínguez (born 1998), Spanish footballer
- Alexander Domínguez (born 1987), Ecuadorian footballer

== See also ==
- Aleix Domínguez (born 1992), Spanish footballer
- Alejandro Domínguez (disambiguation)
