= Manuel Domínguez =

Manuel Dominguez (1803–1882) was a Californian rancher.

Manuel Domínguez may also refer to:

- Manuel Domínguez (1868–1935), Vice President of Paraguay from 1902 to 1904
- Manuel Domínguez (cyclist) (born 1962), Spanish cyclist
- Manuel Domínguez González (born 1974), Spanish politician
