= Carlos Domínguez Rodríguez =

Mexican journalist and political columnist

- Born: c. 1941
- Died: January 13, 2018 (66-67 aged); Nuevo Laredo, Tamaulipas, Mexico
- Cause of death: Murder
- Burial place: Nuxco, Tecpan de Galeana, Guerrero, Mexico
- Occupation: Journalist
- Years active: 38 years
- Employer: Diario de Nuevo Laredo
- Known for: Political columnist

Carlos Domínguez Rodríguez (c. 1941 – January 13, 2018) was a Mexican journalist and political columnist in Nuevo Laredo, Tamaulipas, best known for his column in the Diario de Nuevo Laredo, as well his opinion columns for news websites, before he was murdered.

== Personal ==
Carlos Domínguez Rodriguez was a 77-year-old journalist who wrote about politics. He was married and had two children, a son and daughter. His son was married and the couple had a child, a grandchild. He resided in Nuevo Laredo, Tamaulipas, for most of his life. His body was buried in Nuxco, Tecpan de Galeana, Guerrero.

== Career ==
Domínguez Rodríguez practiced politically committed journalism for nearly 40 years. Although best known for his political column for the Diario de Nuevo Laredo, he also reported for the Noreste Digital and Horizonte de Matamoros, which were popular news websites. He was also known for being an independent journalist who lamented on political violence.

== Death ==
Nuevo Laredo is in Mexico and shown relative to the capital Mexico City

Carlos Domínguez Rodriguez was murdered around 3 p.m. on January 13, 2018. The journalist was attacked while at a stopped traffic light in his Ford Focus. He was taken out of his car and stabbed. Domínguez Rodríguez was later determined to have died from 21 stab wounds to his body. In the aftermath it was not known how many attackers were involved as the men were masked. One of four people in the car, Domínguez Rodríguez was slain in front of his son, daughter-in-law, and grandchild, but only the journalist was attacked.

Domínguez Rodríguez had been working on controversial political columns, and the motive related to his journalistic work was investigated. Domínguez Rodríguez had not reported receiving any threats or requested security.

The Tamaulipas State Attorney General Irving Barrios announced March 28, 2018 the arrests of six suspects. Two of the six allegedly blocked Domínguez’s Ford, forced him out of the car and stabbed him and four of the six were allegedly involved in the planning. One of the planners was identified as Rodolfo Jorge Alfredo Cantú García, who was the relative of a former mayor who Domínguez Rodríguez had criticized in his articles. Barrios announced that his killing was related to his columns.

== Context ==
Carlos Domínguez Rodríguez was a political writer who wrote about the city of Nuevo Laredo, the state of Tamaulipas, as well as national Mexican politics. The last murder of a journalist in the state of Tamaulipas was Zamira Esther Bautista on June 20, 2016.

Press freedom organizations like the Committee to Protect Journalists insist that the violence has created a self imposed "silence zone" for journalists in order to avoid attacks and murder. Domínguez Rodríguez's political articles were important enough to get him killed in the end and criminal organizations were not involved.

== Impact ==
A wave of violence towards journalists hit Mexico in 2017, and 10 journalists, including Rodriguez, were murdered within a year. Multiple investigations have been launched to find the source of all of this violence.

Domínguez Rodríguez death was among the first murder of a media worker in Mexico in 2018, as a former editor Jose Gerardo Martinez was killed in Mexico City a week earlier. It added to the wave of violence in one of the world’s most dangerous countries for media workers.

== Reactions ==
Audrey Azoulay, director-general of UNESCO, said, "I condemn the assassination of Carlos Domínguez Rodríguez in Mexico and urge the authorities to ensure an effective investigation,” “Bringing journalists’ killers to justice is crucial to end violence against those who defend the public’s right to know."

Tamaulipas Governor Francisco Javier García Cabeza de Vaca said, "My condolences to the family of the journalist Carlos Domingues Rodriguez. My commitment to them and the journalistic community of Tamaulipas is that this murder will not go unpunished."

Emmanuel Colombié, the head of Reporters Without Borders Latin America bureau, said, "It is alarming to see that, for Mexico’s journalists, 2018 is beginning as badly as 2017 ended. ... For Carlos’ colleagues, there is no doubt that his assassination is linked to his journalistic work."

Alexandra Ellerbeck, CPJ's North American program coordinator, said, "Mexican authorities must swiftly investigate the murder of Carlos Domínguez Rodríguez, and bring all of those responsible to justice. Until the Mexican government decides to change the pattern of impunity in the country, criminals will continue to get away with killing journalists."

A statement from the General Justice Prosecutor's Office stated, "The state's government will take firm action against any attack on freedom of speech and the work of journalists."

== See also ==
- List of journalists and media workers killed in Mexico
