= Alberto Domínguez =

Alberto Domínguez may refer to:

- Alberto Domínguez (songwriter) (1911–1975), Mexican songwriter
- Alberto Domínguez (cyclist) (1934–2001), Uruguayan-Australian cyclist and radio presenter
- Alberto Domínguez (rower) (born 1978), Spanish rower
- Alberto Domínguez (footballer) (born 1988), Spanish footballer
