= Mellow (surname) =

Mellow is a surname. Notable people with the surname include:

- Bob Mellow (born 1942), American politician
- Gail Mellow (born 1952), American social psychologist
- James R. Mellow (1926–1997), American art critic and biographer
- Jerome Mellow (born 1937), Dominican cricketer
- Melville de Mellow (1913–1989), Indian radio broadcaster
