= Raphael Mello =

Brazilian footballer (born 1992)

Personal information
- Full name: Raphael de Mello Fernandes Cornelio
- Date of birth: 22 July 1992 (age 34)
- Place of birth: Niterói, Brazil
- Height: 1.89 m (6 ft 2 1/2 in)
- Position: Goalkeeper

Team information
- Current team: São João de Ver
- Number: 92

Youth career
- 2004–2008: Vasco da Gama
- 2009–2010: Duque de Caxias

Senior career*
Years	Team	Apps	(Gls)
2010–2014	Duque de Caxias	2	(0)
2014–2015	Bonsucesso	1	(0)
2015–2017	UD Oliveirense	3	(0)
2017–2019	Cesarense	9	(0)
2019–2023	Canelas	60	(0)
2023–	São João de Ver	54	(0)
- * Club domestic league appearances and goals as of 25 June 2025

Raphael de Mello Fernandes Cornelio (born 22 July 1992), known as Raphael Mello, is a Brazilian football player who currently plays for Portuguese club São João de Ver.

== Club career ==
He made his professional debut in the Campeonato Carioca for Duque de Caxias on 9 March 2014 in a game against Fluminense.
