= Portuguese Colonial Act =

Portuguese law against Portuguese Indians

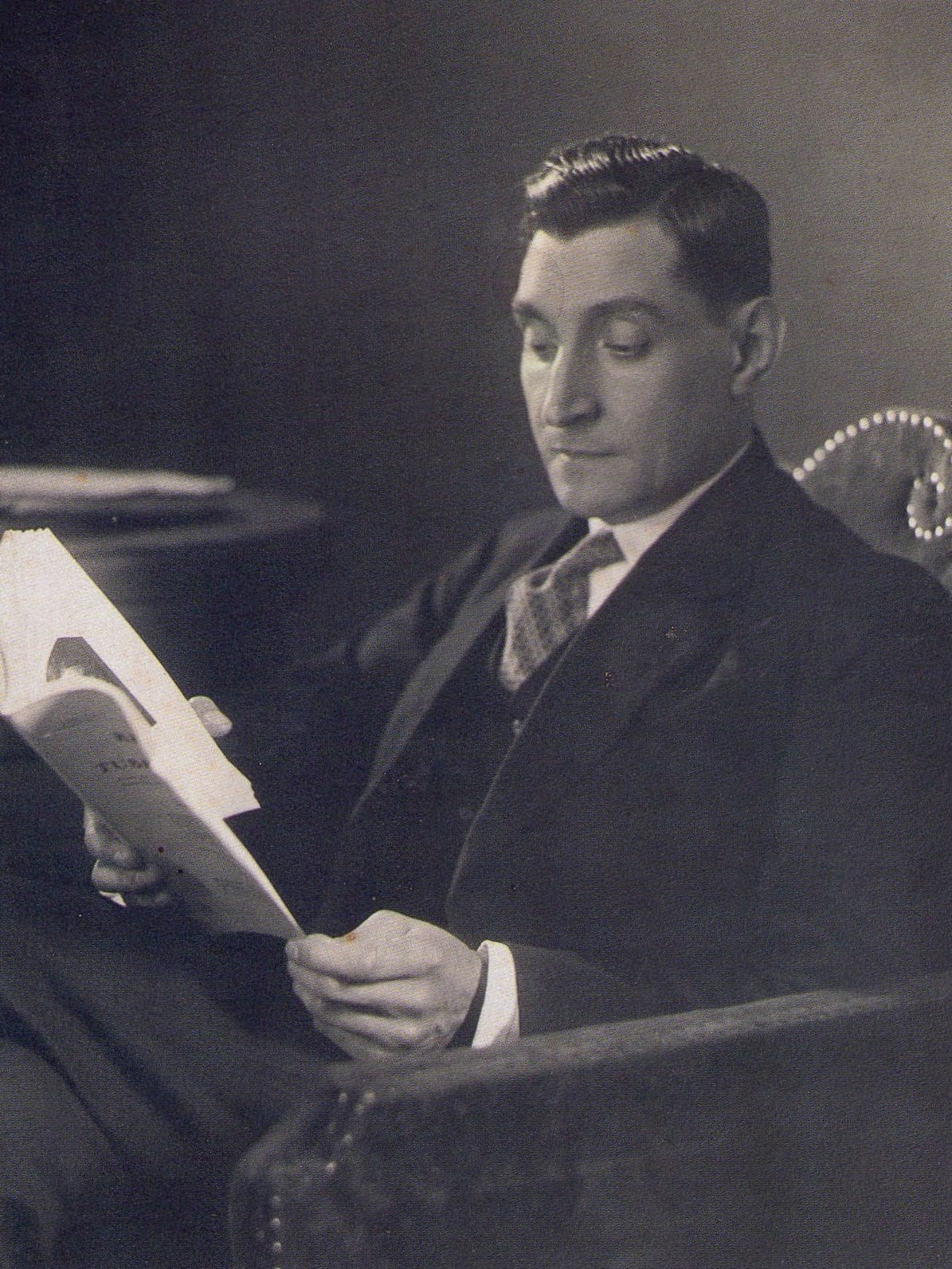
António de Oliveira Salazar

The Portuguese Colonial Act was adopted in 1930, and affected Portuguese India, sanctioning legal discrimination and differentiating them from the metropolitan Portuguese people. Adopted at the behest of António de Oliveira Salazar, then the Minister of Finance, this legal act caused Portuguese Indians to lose a number of benefits, including free trips to Portugal for rest and recreation, reduced allowances compared to white officials, and other facilities that the white Portuguese had overseas which were not made available to Portuguese Indians.

This image of the easily adaptable Portuguese who populated the colonies of Africa and America, thanks to their lack of prejudice toward black and Indian women, was to remain one of the strongest ideological artifices of Portuguese colonisation

— Brazilian anthropologist, Alcida Ramo

The Act was repealed only in 1950, in part because of the contributions of Froilano de Mello, a Goan Catholic doctor and an independent member of parliament in Lisbon. He represented Goa in the Assembly of the Republic. He fought for the rights of Portuguese Indians. De Mello was so successful that, from 1950, Goans regained their status and were treated in equal terms like other Portuguese citizens from the metropolis.

It is in keeping with the organic nature of the Portuguese nation to fulfil its historical function of possessing and colonising overseas territories and civilising the native populations thereof, and to exercise the moral influence which is bound up with the Padroado of the East.

— Section 2 of the Portuguese Colonial Act
