= Mario Domínguez (footballer, born 2009) =

Spanish footballer (born 2009)

Personal information
- Full name: Mario Domínguez Carriles
- Date of birth: 23 January 2009 (age 17)
- Place of birth: Gijón, Spain
- Position: Forward

Team information
- Current team: Valladolid B
- Number: 31

Youth career
- Ponferradina
- 2023–: Valladolid

Senior career*
Years	Team	Apps	(Gls)
2025–	Valladolid B	16	(0)
2025–	Valladolid	2	(0)
- * Club domestic league appearances and goals as of 9 June 2026

Mario Domínguez Carriles (born 23 January 2009) is a Spanish footballer who plays as a forward for Real Valladolid Promesas.

== Career ==
Born in Gijón, Asturias but raised in Ponferrada, Castile and León, Domínguez joined Real Valladolid's youth sides in 2023, from SD Ponferradina. In September 2025, aged 16, he started to train with the first team under manager Guillermo Almada.

Domínguez made his senior debut with the reserves on 12 October 2025, coming on as late substitute in a 4–1 Segunda Federación home routing of CD Lealtad. He made his first team debut on 14 November, replacing Julien Ponceau late into a 1–0 Segunda División home loss to UD Las Palmas; aged 16 years and nearly ten months, he became the second-youngest player to debut for the club, only behind Luis Miguel Gail's debut in 1977.

== Personal life ==
Domínguez's father, known as Fran, was also a footballer. A midfielder, he played in the second division with Recreativo de Huelva, Gimnàstic de Tarragona and Ponferradina.
