= Federico Domínguez (footballer, born 1991) =

Argentine footballer

Personal information
- Date of birth: 17 May 1991 (age 35)
- Place of birth: Villa María, Argentina
- Height: 1.86 m (6 ft 1 in)
- Position: Midfielder

Team information
- Current team: Ilvamaddalena

Youth career
- Newell's Old Boys

Senior career*
| Years | Team | Apps | (Gls) |
| 2010–2014 | Newell's Old Boys | 2 | (0) |
| 2012–2013 | → Atlanta (loan) | 1 | (0) |
| 2013–2014 | → Unión Mar del Plata (loan) | 14 | (1) |
| 2014–2016 | Deportivo Morón | 49 | (5) |
| 2016–2017 | Crucero del Norte | 36 | (1) |
| 2017–2018 | Aldosivi | 2 | (0) |
| 2018 | Nea Salamina | 5 | (0) |
| 2019–2020 | Real Potosí | 52 | (2) |
| 2021 | Guabirá | 0 | (0) |
| 2022 | Lavello | 18 | (0) |
| 2022–2023 | Budoni | | |
| 2023– | Ilvamaddalena | 6 | (1) |
- * Club domestic league appearances and goals as of 17 November 2024

Federico Domínguez (born 17 May 1991) is an Argentine professional footballer who plays as a midfielder for Italian Serie D club Ilvamaddalena.

== Career ==
Domínguez's career got underway with Newell's Old Boys in 2010, making his professional debut on 7 August during a home defeat to Estudiantes (LP) in the Argentine Primera División. Between 2012 and 2014, after two appearances for Newell's, Domínguez was loaned out twice. In July 2012 to Atlanta of Primera B Metropolitana, and to Torneo Argentino A's Unión Mar del Plata. In total, he featured a total of seventeen times for those clubs. For Unión, Domínguez netted his first senior goal; versus Estudiantes (SL) on 30 September 2013. A permanent move to Deportivo Morón was completed in August 2014.

He remained with Morón for the 2014 and 2015 campaigns, scoring five goals in fifty appearances. On 26 July 2016, Crucero del Norte signed Domínguez. The last of thirty-six appearances for Crucero came a year later during a fixture with Gimnasia y Esgrima, in a season that ended with relegation from Primera B Nacional. 2017–18 saw Domínguez spend it with Aldosivi, a team that ended top of the table and one that gained promotion to the Primera División. However, he was selected in just three fixtures for Aldosivi. Cypriot First Division side Nea Salamina became Domínguez's seventh career team in 2018.

In 2019, Domínguez moved to Bolivian Primera División side Real Potosí. He scored his opening goal during his sixth match, netting in a 3–2 league victory over Destroyers on 11 February. Another goal followed in May against Bolívar, amid thirty-five appearances in his first season. He then featured seventeen times across the subsequent 2020 campaign as they finished third bottom. In January 2021, Domínguez, after prematurely being announced as new signing by Atlético Palmaflor, moved to fellow top-flight team Guabirá; who had just qualified for the Copa Sudamericana.

On 14 January 2022, Domínguez moved to Italy to join Serie D club Lavello. In July 2022, he left Lavello to join Eccellenza Sardinia amateurs Budoni.

== Career statistics ==
As of 11 January 2021.

Club statistics
| Club | Season | League | | | Cup | | Continental | | Other | | Total | |
| Club | Season | Division | Apps | Goals | Apps | Goals | Apps | Goals | Apps | Goals | Apps | Goals |
|---|---|---|---|---|---|---|---|---|---|---|---|---|
| Newell's Old Boys | 2010–11 | Primera División | 2 | 0 | 0 | 0 | 0 | 0 | 0 | 0 | 2 | 0 |
| Newell's Old Boys | 2011–12 | Primera División | 0 | 0 | 0 | 0 | — | | 0 | 0 | 0 | 0 |
| Newell's Old Boys | 2012–13 | Primera División | 0 | 0 | 0 | 0 | — | | 0 | 0 | 0 | 0 |
| Newell's Old Boys | 2013–14 | Primera División | 0 | 0 | 0 | 0 | 0 | 0 | 0 | 0 | 0 | 0 |
| Newell's Old Boys | Total | | 2 | 0 | 0 | 0 | 0 | 0 | 0 | 0 | 2 | 0 |
| Atlanta (loan) | 2012–13 | Primera B Metropolitana | 1 | 0 | 0 | 0 | — | | 0 | 0 | 1 | 0 |
| Unión Mar del Plata (loan) | 2013–14 | Torneo Argentino A | 14 | 1 | 2 | 0 | — | | 0 | 0 | 16 | 1 |
| Deportivo Morón | 2014 | Primera B Metropolitana | 14 | 1 | 0 | 0 | — | | 1 (Note: Appearance(s) in the Primera B Metropolitana play-offs) | 0 | 15 | 1 |
| Deportivo Morón | 2015 | Primera B Metropolitana | 35 | 4 | 1 | 0 | — | | 0 | 0 | 36 | 4 |
| Deportivo Morón | 2016 | Primera B Metropolitana | 0 | 0 | 0 | 0 | — | | 0 | 0 | 0 | 0 |
| Deportivo Morón | Total | | 49 | 5 | 1 | 0 | — | | 1 | 0 | 51 | 5 |
| Crucero del Norte | 2016–17 | Primera B Nacional | 36 | 1 | 0 | 0 | — | | 0 | 0 | 36 | 1 |
| Aldosivi | 2017–18 | Primera B Nacional | 2 | 0 | 0 | 0 | — | | 1 (Note: Appearance(s) in the Primera B Nacional play-offs) | 0 | 3 | 0 |
| Nea Salamina | 2018–19 | First Division | 5 | 0 | 0 | 0 | — | | 0 | 0 | 5 | 0 |
| Real Potosí | 2019 | Bolivian Primera División | 35 | 2 | — | | — | | 0 | 0 | 35 | 2 |
| Real Potosí | 2020 | Bolivian Primera División | 17 | 0 | — | | — | | 0 | 0 | 17 | 0 |
| Real Potosí | Total | | 52 | 2 | 0 | 0 | — | | 0 | 0 | 52 | 2 |
| Guabirá | 2021 | Bolivian Primera División | 0 | 0 | — | | — | | 0 | 0 | 0 | 0 |
| Career total | | | 161 | 9 | 3 | 0 | 0 | 0 | 2 | 0 | 166 | 9 |

== Honours ==
Aldosivi

- Primera B Nacional: 2017–18
