= Alejandro Domínguez =

Alejandro Dominguez or Alejandro Domínguez may refer to:

- Alejandro Domínguez (footballer, born 1981), Argentinian footballer
- Alejandro Domínguez Coello (c. 1950–2005), Mexican chief of police
- Alejandro Domínguez (Mexican footballer) (born 1961), appeared at the 1986 FIFA World Cup
- Alejandro Domínguez (football executive) (born 1972), Paraguayan football administrator, president of CONMEBOL

== See also ==
- Alex Dominguez (disambiguation)
