= Raúl Domínguez =

Raúl Domínguez may refer to:

- Raúl Domínguez Rex (born 1970), Mexican politician
- Raúl Domínguez (cyclist) (born 1972), Cuban retired cyclist
- Raúl Domínguez (footballer) (born 1986), Spanish footballer
