= Maria Alicia Dominguez =

Argentine poet and writer (1904–1988)

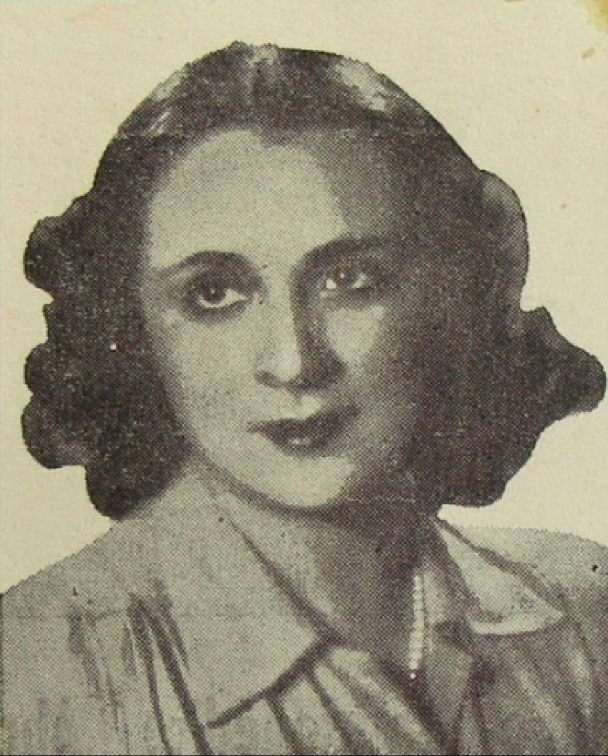
- Maria Alicia Dominguez in her youth
- Born: September 6, 1904; Buenos Aires, Argentina
- Died: April 9, 1988 (aged 83); Buenos Aires, Argentina
- Occupations: Poet, Novelist and Essayist
- Known for: Children's Literature

Maria Alicia Dominguez (Spanish: María Alicia Domínguez) (1904–1988) was an Argentine poet, novelist and essayist.

== Early life ==
She was born in Buenos Aires on September 6, 1904. She graduated as a professor of literature from an Argentine university, el Instituto Nacional del Profesorado de Lenguas Vivas.

== Career ==
She began her career as a teacher at some educational institutions in Buenos Aires, namely the "Institutos Mitre y Bernasconi", the "Colegios Nacionales Roca y Sarmiento" and the "Normal 6". In 1925 she wrote her first book of poems, La rueca. She wrote more than 30 books in total after that. She also worked in "la Editorial Columba" as a writer for their weekly magazine, Intervalo, from 1950s to 1960s.

When she retired as a teacher, she devoted all of her time and energy to writing children's literature.

== Relatives ==
In her youth, she had an intimate relationship with Leopoldo Lugones. Some people believe that she once attempted suicide because of her breakup with him, or because of society's pressure to break up with him. She ultimately married a book publisher named, Fernando Foyatier.

== Selected work ==
She wrote more than 30 books, the most popular among them are the following,

- La rueca (Poem, 1925)
- Rosas en la nieve (Poem, 1945)
- Ginés del mar (Novel, 1976)
- El niño que olvidó su nombre (Story, 1977)
- Cocotón (Theater, 1977)
- Canciones de Mari-Alas (Poetry, 1978)

== Selected awards ==
She won the following major awards for her literary work:

- Premio Municipal de Poesía de Buenos Aires (1966)
- Faja de Honor de La Sociedad Argentina de Escritores (1967)
- Cruz de Madera otorgada por el Instituto de Estudios Franciscanos (1973)
- Premio Nacional de Literatura Infantil (1983)
- Premio Konex 1984: Literatura para Niños (1984)
