= Mellow Yellow (disambiguation) =

"Mellow Yellow" is a 1966 song by Donovan.

Mellow Yellow may also refer to:

- Mellow Yellow (album), the Donovan album on which the song appears
- Mellow Yellow coffeeshop, an Amsterdam cannabis shop
- Mello Yello, a soft drink
- King Mellow Yellow, a Jamaican deejay

== See also ==
- Bananadine
