= Diego Domínguez =

Diego Domínguez may refer to:

- Diego Domínguez (rugby union) (born 1966), Argentine rugby union player for Argentina and Italy
- Diego Domínguez (rally driver) (born 1972), rally driver from Paraguay
- Diego Domínguez Jr. (born 2000), his son, Paraguayan rally driver
- Diego Domínguez (actor) (born 1991), Spanish actor and singer
- Diego Domínguez (canoeist) (born 2003), Spanish sprint canoeist
