= Álvaro Domínguez =

Álvaro Domínguez may refer to:

- Álvaro Domínguez (footballer, born 1981), Colombian footballer
- Álvaro Domínguez (footballer, born 1989), Spanish footballer
