= Melo Dominguez =

American artist (born 1978)

Melquiades "Melo" Dominguez, also known as Mel Dominguez (born October 14, 1978) is an American muralist, painter, and gallerist. They are Chicanx and have lived in the city of South Tucson, Arizona, since 2007, and co-own Galeria Mitolera in Tucson.

== Life and career ==
Melquiades "Melo" Dominguez was born on October 14, 1978, in Glendale, California. They (Note: Dominguez uses they/them pronouns.) are Chicanx, non-binary, and queer. In 1980, they moved to El Sereno, which is a neighborhood in the Eastside of Los Angeles. Dominguez started as a street graffiti artist, going by their graffiti name of "Melo", which can be seen on all their murals and artworks. Melo's artwork is depicts Chicanx culture involving political, social, and environmental issues.

In 2002, Dominguez received an Associate of Arts degree in Graphic Design from Platt College in Eagle Rock, California. In that same year, Dominguez was doing the J. Paul Getty Museum internship at Self Help Graphics & Art in East Los Angeles.

In 2012, the Tucson-Pima Arts Council nominated Dominguez as Emerging Artist of the Year.

Melo Dominguez contributed to an artwork titled "Speaking for the Dead" which was shown in an exhibit along with a group.

In 2019, Dominguez received a Research & Development Grant from the Arizona Commission on the Arts to enhance their skills in printmaking, sculpture, and welding, enabling them to undertake more ambitious public art installations using both new and recycled materials.

== Artwork and exhibitions ==
- 2015, Speaking for the Dead, group exhibition, Innovation Gallery at ASU School of Human Evolution & Social Change, Tempe, Arizona
- 2014, Eco-Themed Mural, Manzo Elementary School, Tucson, Arizona
- Arizona Highway (2012) print collected by Los Angeles County Museum of Art
- 2023,"Casa de Rasquache" exhibit at Pidgin Palace Arts in Tucson

== Publications ==
Dominguez, M. “Melo.” (2019). Self-Portrait. Equity & Excellence in Education, 52(4), 527. https://doi.org/10.1080/10665684.2020.1713252
