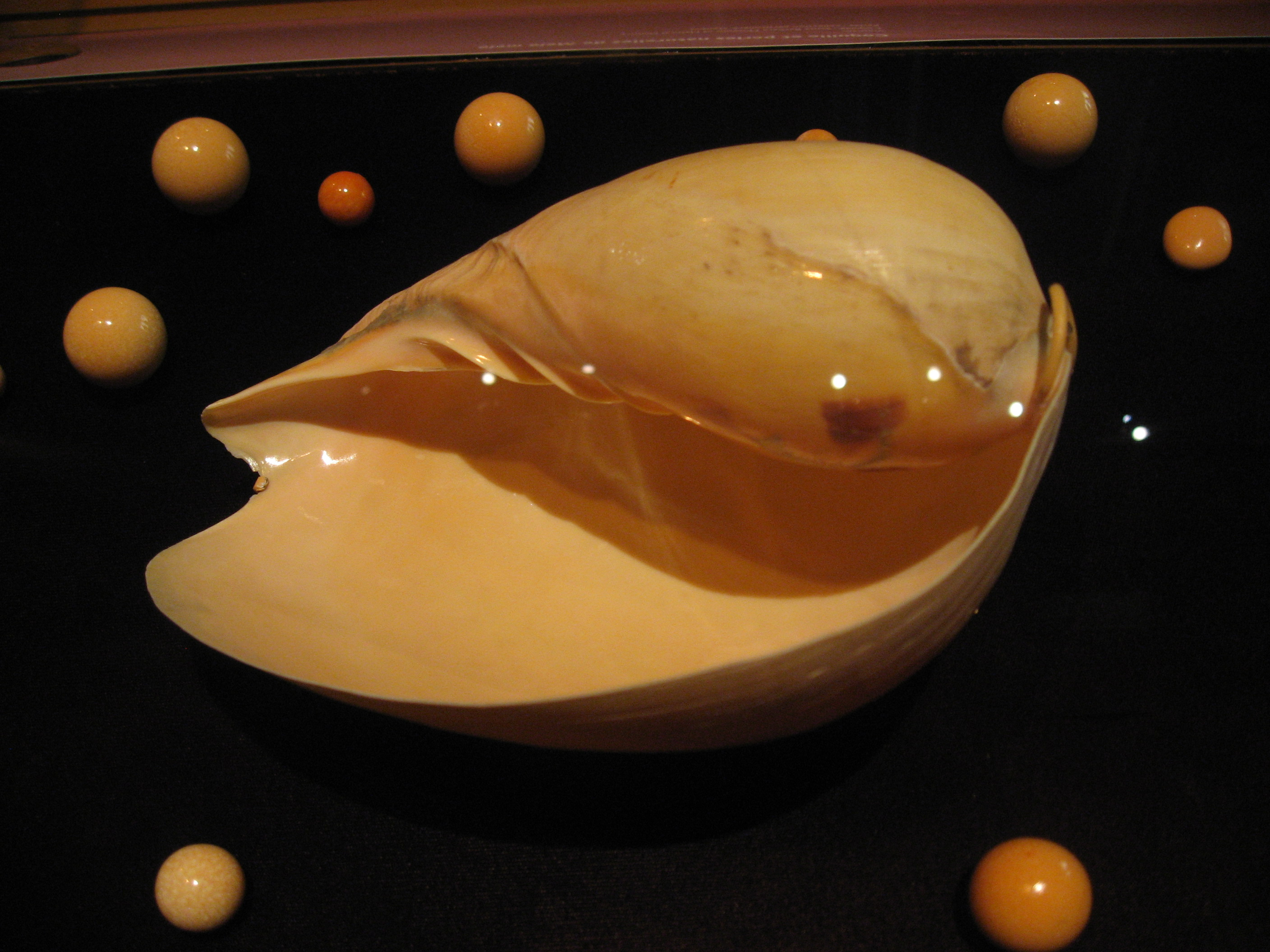
- A shell of the Indian volute, Melo melo surrounded by a group of pearls from that species

Scientific classification
- Kingdom: Animalia
- Phylum: Mollusca
- Class: Gastropoda
- Subclass: Caenogastropoda
- Order: Neogastropoda
- Family: Volutidae
- Tribe: Melonini
- Genus: Melo; Broderip in Sowerby I, 1826

= Melo (gastropod) =

Genus of gastropods

Melo is a genus of extremely large sea snails, marine gastropod molluscs in the family Volutidae, the volutes. Because of their huge ovate shells, these snails are often known as "bailers" (the shells were sometimes used for bailing out canoes) or "melons" (because the shell resembles that fruit).

Species in this genus sometimes produce large pearls. The image in the taxobox shows a group of these pearls with a shell of the species Melo melo.

== Description ==
The large shell is subovate and ventricose. The spire is short. The apex is obtuse, papillary, persistent. The whorls are smooth. The body whorl is posteriorly coronated. The aperture is oblong and wide. The columella shows several oblique plaits, the anterior the largest. The outer lip is simple, acute and obliquely truncate in front.

== Species ==
The following species are recognised in the genus Melo:

- Melo aethiopicus (Linnaeus, 1758) Crowned baler
- Melo amphora, (Lightfoot, 1786) Giant baler
- Melo ashmorensis Morrison, 2005
- Melo broderipii (Griffith, E. & E. Pidgeon, 1834)
- Melo gajahmadai Dharma, 2023
- Melo georginae (Griffith, E. & E. Pidgeon, 1834)
- Melo melo (Lightfoot, 1786) Indian volute
- Melo miltonis (Griffith, E. & E. Pidgeon, 1834) Milton's melon or Southern bailer
- Melo nusantara Dharma, 2023
- †Melo persolida (Beets, 1986)
- Melo peterstimpsoni (Lamarck, 1811)
- Melo tessellatus (Lamarck, 1811)
- Melo umbilicatus (Broderip in Sowerby, 1826) Heavy baler or umbilicate melon

== Gallery ==
Video of a live individual of Melo amphora crawling at low tide

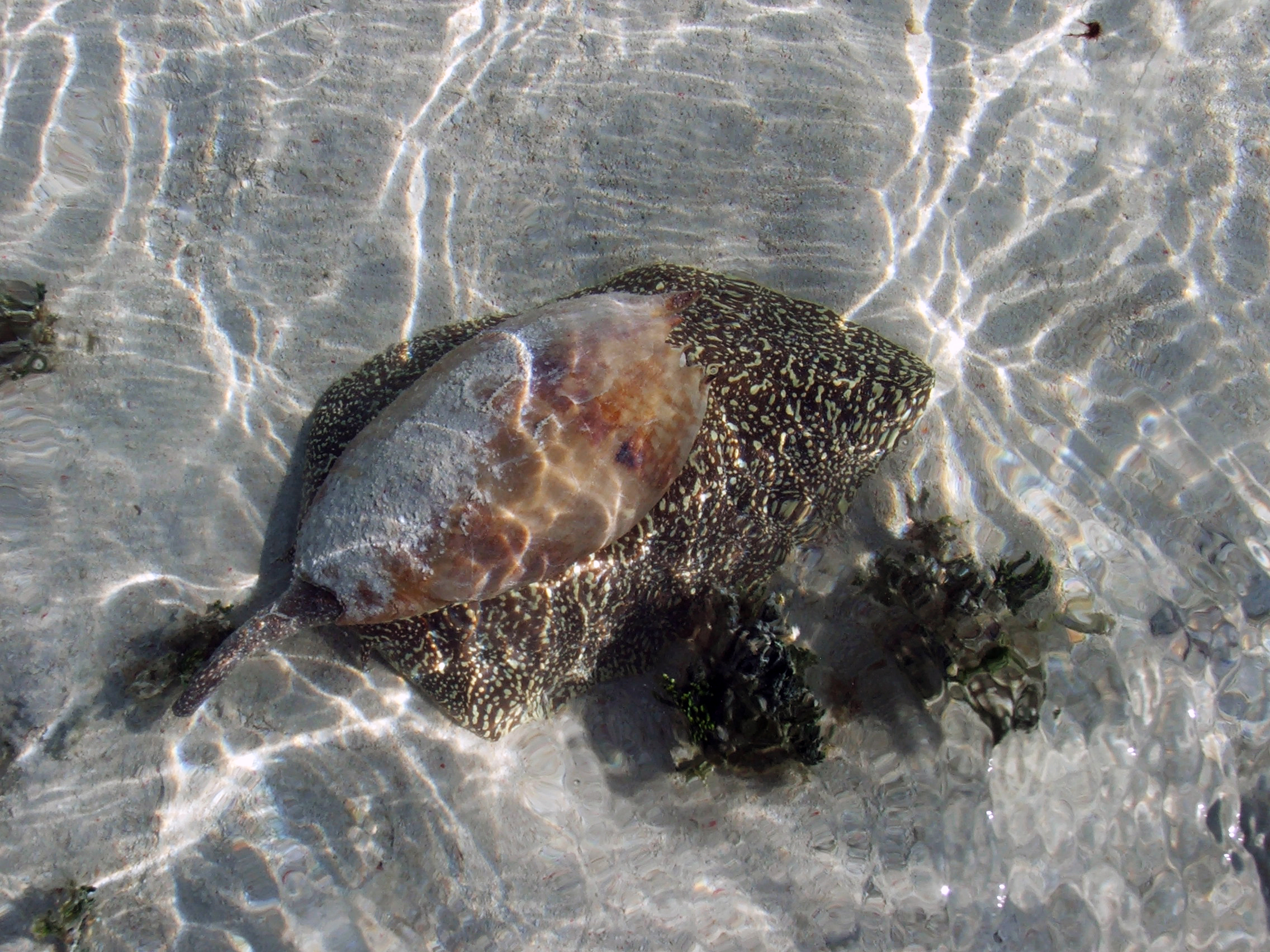
A live individual of what is probably Melo umbilicatus

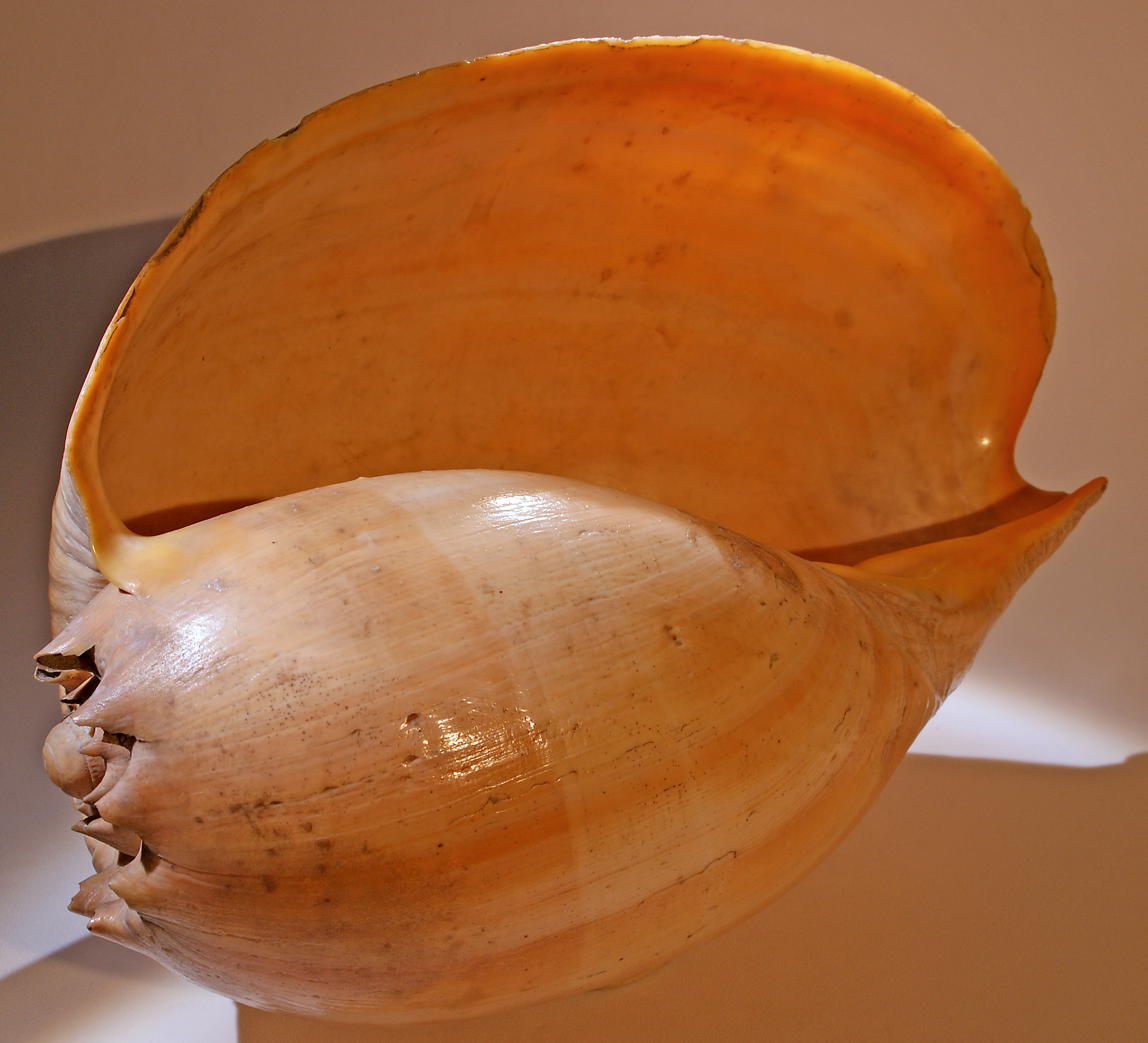
A shell of Melo aethiopica

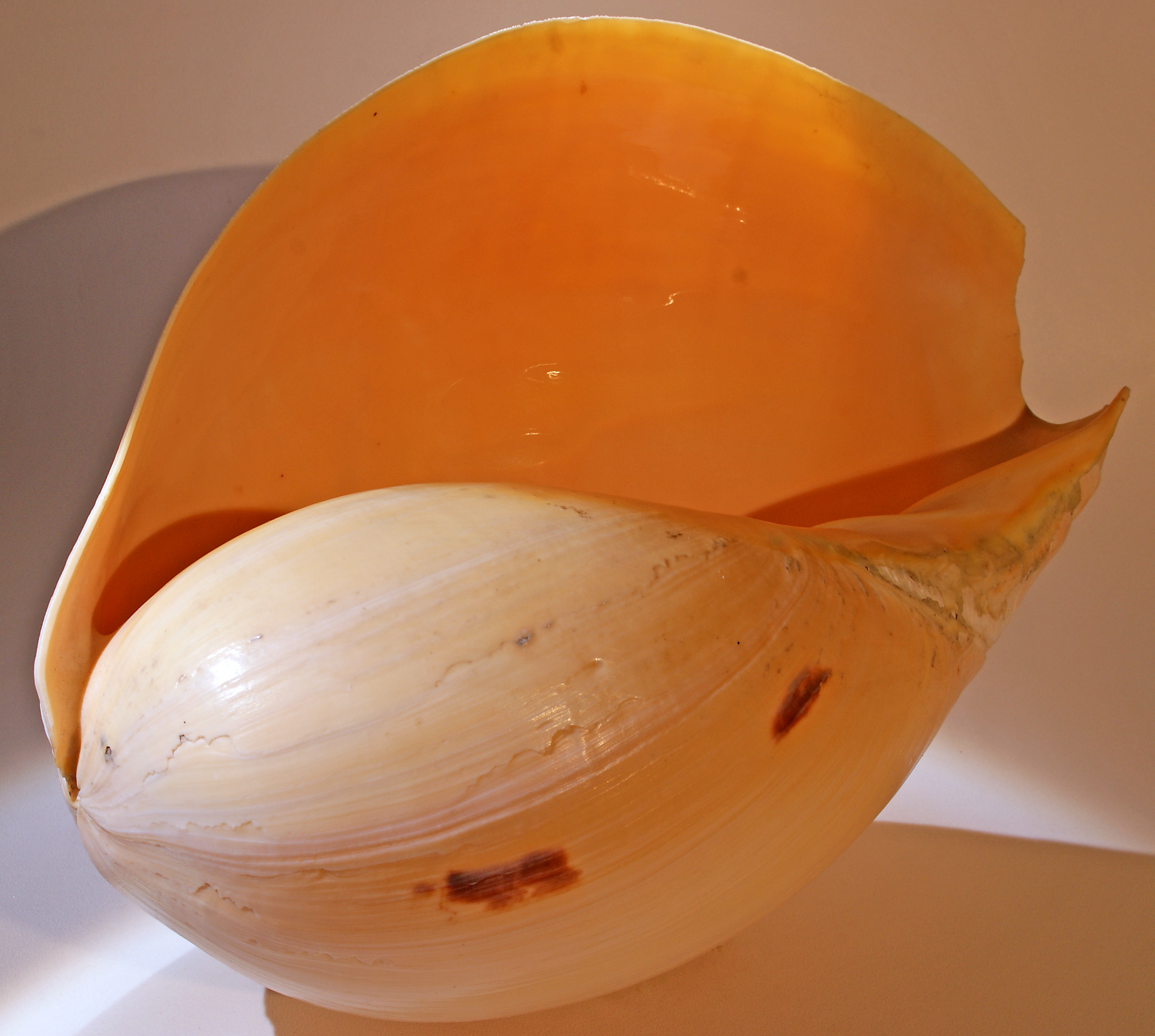
A shell of Melo melo

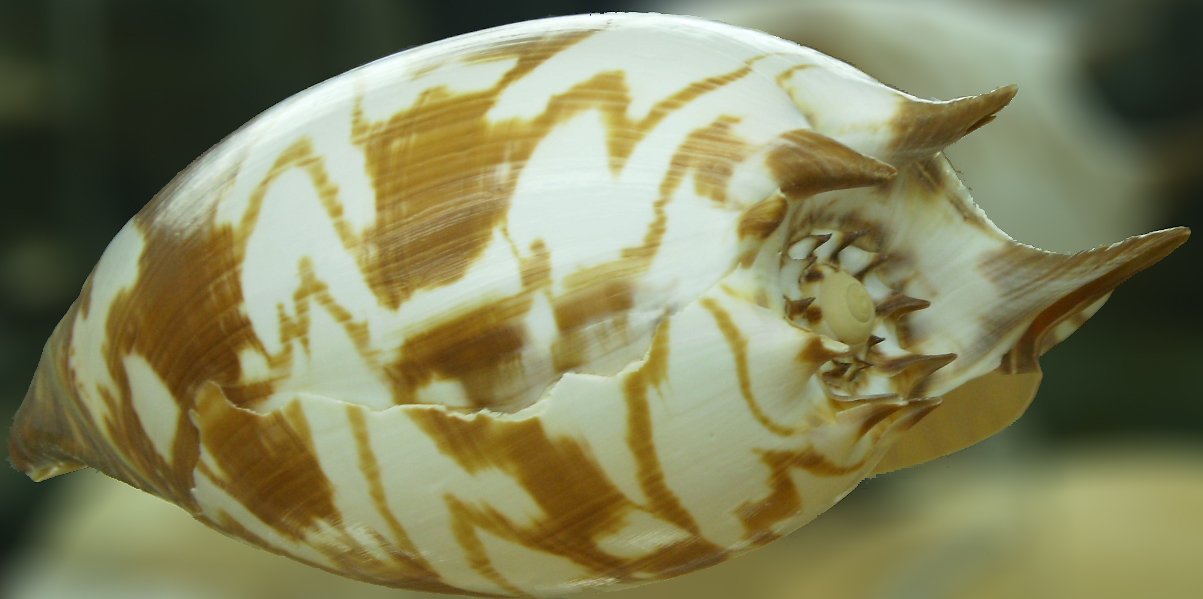
A juvenile shell of what is probably Melo amphora

== Ecology ==
Parasites of Melo sp. include trematode Lophotaspis macdonaldi.
