= Francisco Manuel de Mello =

Portuguese writer

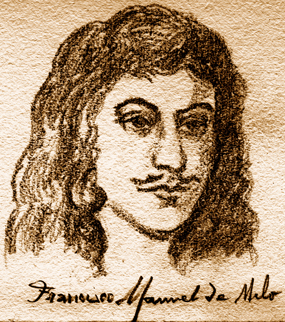
- Francisco Manuel de Mello
- Born: 23 November 1608; Lisbon, Kingdom of Portugal
- Died: 24 August 1666 (aged 57); Lisbon
- Occupations: Writer, soldier

Francisco Manuel de Mello (23 November 1608 – 24 August 1666) was a 17th century Portuguese historian, poet and prose writer. He spent much of his adult life imprisoned or in exile.

== Youth ==
Francisco Manuel de Mello, born with a connection on his father's side to the royal house of Braganza, was a native of Lisbon, and was of both Spanish and Portuguese descent. de Mello also had some Jewish ancestry (which would later be an issue during his acceptance into the Order of Christ in 1634).

de Mello studied the humanities at the Jesuit College of St. Antão, where he showed a precocious talent, and tradition says that at the age of fourteen he composed a poem in ottava rima to celebrate the recovery of Bahia from the Dutch, while at seventeen he wrote a scientific work, Concordancias mathematicas.

== Military career ==
The death of his father, Dom Luiz de Mello, drove him early to soldiering, and having joined a contingent for the Flanders war, he found himself in the historic storm of January 1627, when the pick of the Portuguese fleet suffered shipwreck in the Bay of Biscay. He spent much of the next ten years of his life in military routine work in the Iberian Peninsula, varied by visits to the court of Madrid, where he contracted a friendship with the Spanish poet Quevedo and earned the favor of the powerful minister Olivares. In 1637 the latter despatched him in company with the conde de Linhares on a mission to pacify the revolted city of Évora, and on the same occasion the duke of Braganza, afterwards King John IV (for whom he acted as confidential agent at Madrid), employed him to satisfy Philip III of Portugal of his loyalty to the Philippine Dynasty.

In the following year he suffered a short imprisonment in Lisbon. In 1639 he was appointed colonel of one of the regiments raised for service in Flanders, and in June that year he took a leading part in defending A Coruña against a French fleet commanded by the archbishop of Bordeaux, while in the following August he directed the embarcation of an expeditionary force of 10,000 men when Admiral Oquendo sailed with seventy ships to meet the French and Dutch (A). He came safely through the naval defeat in the channel suffered by the Spaniards at the hands of Maarten Tromp, and on the outbreak of the Catalan revolt became chief of the staff to the commander-in-chief of the royal forces, and was selected to write an account of the campaign, the Historia de la guerra de Cataluña, which became a Spanish classic.

On the restoration of a Portuguese ruling dynasty, in 1640 he was imprisoned by order of Olivares, and when released hastened to offer his sword to John IV. He travelled to England, where he spent some time at the court of Charles I, and thence passing over to Holland assisted the Portuguese ambassador to equip a fleet in aid of Portugal, and himself brought it safely to Lisbon in October 1641.

For the next three years he was employed in various important military commissions and further busied himself in defending by his pen the king's title to his newly acquired throne.

(A) Richelieu had told De Sourdis (French fleet) to let others take the chestnuts out of the fire "tirer les marrons du feu". He said it would take 10yrs to replace the French fleet and told De Sourdis 'on no occasion to risk the fleet unless practically certain of success'.

== Imprisonment and exile ==
An intrigue with the beautiful countess of Vila Nova, and her husband's jealousy, led to his arrest on 19 November 1644 on a false charge of assassination, and he lay in prison about nine years. Though his innocence was clear, the court of his Order, the Portuguese Military Order of Christ, influenced by his enemies, deprived him of his comenda and sentenced him to perpetual banishment in Africa with a heavy money fine, and the king would not intervene to save him. Owing perhaps to the intercession of the queen regent of France and other powerful friends, his sentence was finally commuted into one of exile to the colony of Brazil.

During his long imprisonment, he finished and printed his history of the Catalan Revolt, and also wrote and published a volume of Spanish verses and some religious treatises, and composed in Portuguese a volume of homely philosophy, the Carta de Guia de Casados and a Memorial in his own defence to the king, which Herculano considered perhaps the most eloquent piece of reasoning in the language.

During his exile in Brazil, where he sailed on 17 April 1655, he lived at Bahia, where he wrote one of his Epanaphoras de varia Historia and two parts of his masterpiece, the Apologos dialogaes.

== Literary endeavors ==
He returned home in 1659, and from then until 1663 we find him on and off in Lisbon, frequenting the celebrated Academia dos Generosos, of which he was five times elected president. In the last year he proceeded to Parma and Rome, by way of England, and France, and Afonso VI of Portugal charged him to negotiate with the Curia about the provision of bishops for Portuguese sees and to report on suitable marriages for the king and his brother. During his stay in Rome he published his Obras morales, dedicated to Queen Catherine, wife of Charles II of England, and his Cartas familiares. On his way back to Portugal he printed his Obras Métricas at Lyon in May 1665, and he died in Lisbon the following year.

Manuel de Mello's early Spanish verses are influenced by Gongora; his Portuguese sonnets and cartas on moral subjects have been described as notable for their power, sincerity, and perfection of form. He strove to emancipate himself from foreign faults of style, and by virtue of his native genius, and his knowledge of the traditional poetry of the people, and the best Quinhentista models, he became Portugal's leading lyric poet and prose writer of the 17th century. As with Luís de Camões, imprisonments and exile contributed to make Manuel de Melo a great writer: His Letters, addressed to the leading nobles, ecclesiastics, diplomats and literati of the time, are written in a conversational style, lighted up by flashes of wit and enriched with apposite illustrations and quotations. His commerce with the best authors appears in the Hospital des lettras, a brilliant chapter of criticism forming part of the Apologos dialogaes. His comedy in redondilhas, the Auto do Fidalgo Aprendiz, is one of the last anti; quite the worthiest production of the school of Gil Vicente, and may be considered an anticipation of Molière's Le Bourgeois gentilhomme.

== Bibliography ==
There is no uniform edition of his works, but a list of them is found in his Obras morales, and the various editions are set out in Innocencio da Silvas Diccionarso bibliographico portuguez. See Dom Francisco Manuel de Mello, his Life and Writings, by Edgar Prestage (Manchester, 1905), D. Francisco Manuel de Mello, documentos biographicos, and D. Francisco Manuel de Mello, obras autographas e ineditas, by the same writer, in the Archivo hislorico portuguez for 1909.

Manuel de Mellos prose style is considered at length by G. Cirot in Mariana historien (Bordeaux, 1905).

== Death and burial ==
de Mello died in Lisbon, Portugal in 1666. de Mello's date of death was historically generally accepted to be October 13, 1666, including in Edgar Presage's earlier works on the man. When Edgar Prestage underwent his 1942 revisions on de Mello, however, Prestage (for reasons unclear) changed the date of death of Mello to August 24, 1666; according to the timeline of de Mello's travels in Prestage's 1922 book, this would have been impossible.

Francisco Manuel de Mello was buried in the Convent of St. Joseph de Ribamar at Algés, in Lisbon, Portugal.
