= Froilano de Mello =

Portuguese Indian medical scientist (1887–1955)

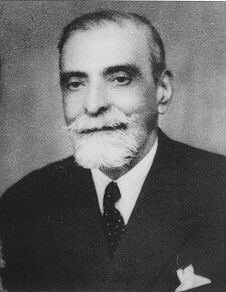
- Born: Indalencio Pascoal Froilano de Mello; 17 May 1887; Benaulim, Goa, Portuguese India
- Died: 9 January 1955 (aged 67); São Paulo, Brazil
- Education: Goa Medical College, University of Porto
- Spouse: Marie Caillat (died 1921) Hedwig Bachmann (m. 1923)
- Children: 6
- Scientific career
- Fields: Microbiology
- Workplaces: Goa Medical College, University of Paris, University of Porto

Indalencio Pascoal Froilano de Mello (17 May 1887 – 9 January 1955) was a Portuguese Indian microbiologist, medical scientist, professor, author and an independent MP in the Portuguese parliament. During his scientific career, Mello was responsible for the discovery of thousands of protozoa, parasites and microbes which today bear the Latin names given by him, followed by his own surname. He served as mayor of Nova Goa from 1938 to 1945. During his tenure as an MP from 1945 to 1949, he represented the constituency of Portuguese India, namely its overseas provinces of Goa, Daman and Diu in the National Assembly at Lisbon.

== Early life ==
Indalencio Pascoal Froilano de Mello was born in Benaulim, Salcette concelho to Goan Catholic parents. He was the eldest son of the lawyer Constâncio Francisco de Mello, and Delfina Rodrigues. His maternal grandfather Dr. Raimundo Venâncio Rodrigues had been the mayor of Coimbra, member of the Cortes Gerais in Portugal and one of the first directors of Goa Medical College (then known as the Escola Medico–Cirurgica de Goa). De Mello's patrilineal ancestors were Catholics of Brahmin origin from Salcette.

Froilano de Mello's father died when he was twelve years old, which adversely affected the family's fortunes and brought about difficult times for the entire family. The rental income generated from the family properties managed by the caretaker was insufficient to meet the family's needs and consequently, the young Froilano had to work while he studied. He graduated in Panjim as a medical doctor, and later repeated the course at Porto, Portugal. In 1910, he returned to Goa with an additional diploma in Tropical medicine of the University of Lisbon.

== Academic and scientific career ==
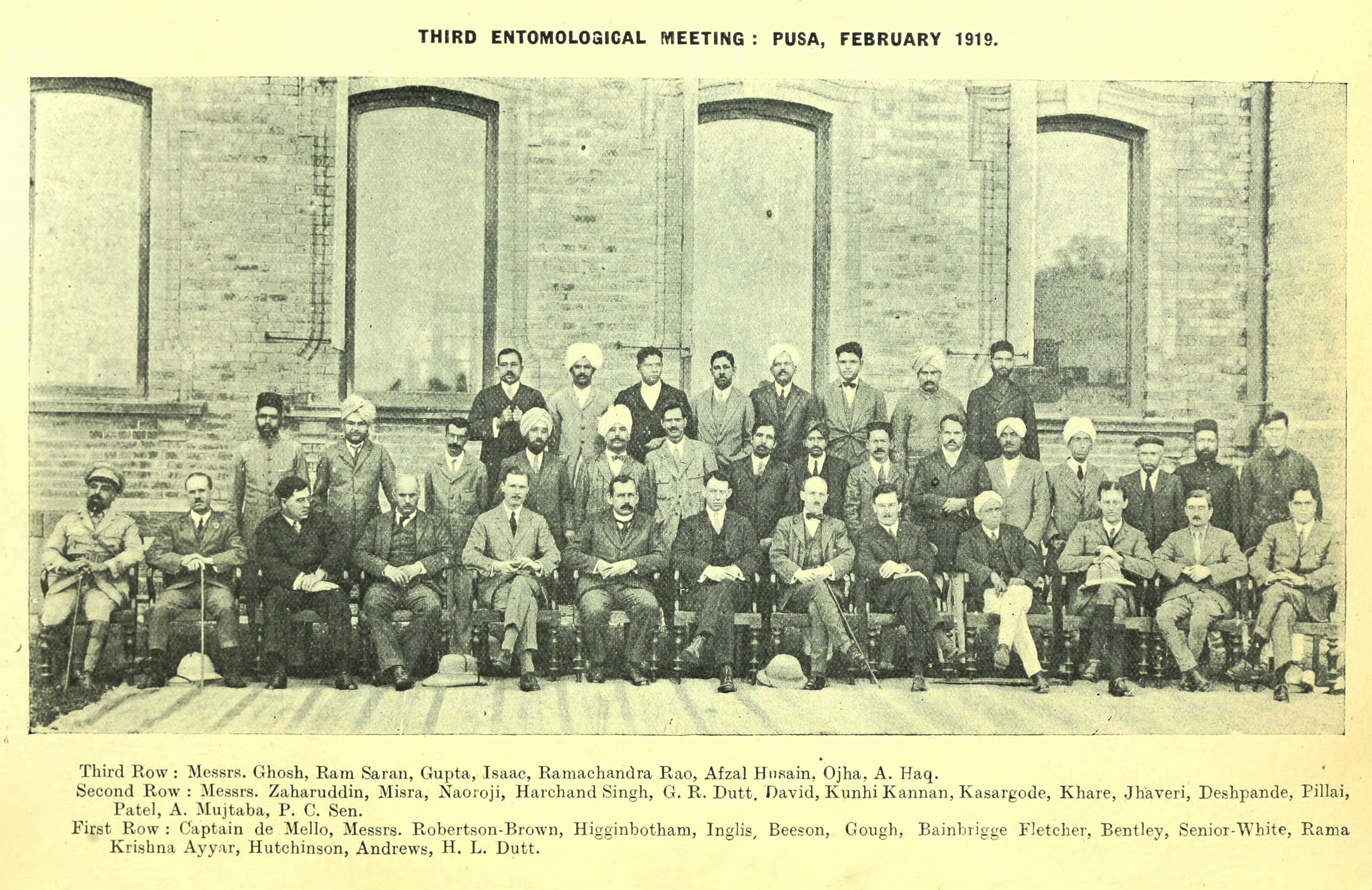
Captain de Mello in uniform (seated extreme left) attending the third entomological meeting at Pusa in 1919

Mello's academic career got a start in 1910, at the age of 23, when he was appointed as a professor at the prestigious Goa Medical College. From 1913 to 1914, he served as an assistant professor at the University of Sorbonne in Paris, and was a visiting professor at the University of Porto in 1921. Mello was promoted to the post of director of the Goa Medical College's Bacteriological institute, a small shed in Campal which would serve as the center of his scientific research from 1914 to 1945. His achievements in microbiology and parasitology made the institute world-famous largely because he ensured that all his works were simultaneously published in English, Portuguese and French. Mello would later go on to become the college's dean.

During the same period, he also served as Chief of Public Health for Portuguese India. He undertook a postgraduate course in parasitology in Kaiser Willhelm Institute fuer Biologie, Berlin, and at the Max Planck Institute, Potsdam, Germany from 1922 to 1923. In 1922, at the age of 35, Mello became a Colonel in the Portuguese Army Medical Corps, achieving the highest rank in the medical military hierarchy of that time, exclusively through merits in the medical campaigns on Public Health which he carried out in Goa, Daman, Diu, and in Angola. Mello was the head of a Portuguese delegation to the World Leprosy Conference in Cuba and is known to have attended at least 40 World Conferences, including the All India Sanitary Conference in Lucknow (1914) and the Third Entomological Meeting in Lucknow (1914) where, at the invitation of the Governor-General of India, he lectured on medical mycology. His researches in tropical medicine brought him international fame and recognition as a world-renowned expert on the subject. Mello published more than 200 research papers on bacteriology in Portuguese, French and English journals. He founded the following medical journals in Goa, Boletim Geral de Medicina, Arquivos Indo-Portugueses de Medicina e Historia Natural, and Arquivos da Escola Medico–Cirurgica de Nova Goa. His work in French entitled, A la veille du Centenaire (On the eve of the Centenary) elaborated in great detail the contributions of Goa Medical College during the first hundred years of its establishment. Separate from his medical career, Mello also authored a book in 1946 on the Bengali poet, Rabindranath Tagore entitled O Cantico da Vida na Poesia Tagoreana (The song of life in the poetry of Tagore).

Mello was a member of the Royal Asiatic Society of Bengal; the Indian Academy of Sciences; Societie de Pathologie Exotique and Societie de Biologie de Paris in Paris; Sociedade de Ciencias Medicas, Sociedade de Etnologia & Antropologia and Sociedade de Geografia in Lisbon. He was the recipient of medals of honour from Queen Wilhelmina of the Netherlands in 1938, Pope Pius XII on the occasion of the canonisation of St. John de Brito in 1947, President Ramón Grau of Cuba in 1949, and from President Eurico Gaspar Dutra of Brazil in 1950. He also held the following Portuguese honours: Grande Official da Ordem de Aviz, Comendador da Ordem de São Tiago and Comendador da Ordem de Benemerencia.

== Medical campaigns ==
Mello worked passionately to eradicate tuberculosis in Goa and malaria from Velha Goa. His efforts towards this end, led to the establishment of two important institutions, namely the first leprosarium in Asia at Macasẚna in Salcette in 1934, today known as Leprosaria Froilano de Mello and Dispensario Virgem Peregrina at St. Inez, Panjim. He also established the TB sanitarium in Margao in 1928 and opened a ward for those suffering from leprosy in Daman. In 1926, Mello with the help of one of his pupils, Dr. Luís Bras de Sa, carefully mapped the site of Old Goa and recognised more than 4,800 wells in the area, which were breeding grounds of anopheles mosquitoes. This led to the closure of these wells, and in turn, led to the reduction of the mosquito breeding sites. This factor played a significant role in curbing the Malaria epidemic in Goa in the 1920s.

Mello also undertook new measures to improve urban sanitation, which included the introduction of Sanitary Police in Panjim. Faced with the task of dealing with the city's rabies epidemic during his term as mayor, he ordered the elimination of all stray dogs, offering a reward per stray dog. This resulted in a dramatic reduction in the number of cases of rabies. A similar reward was offered for the capture or destruction of venomous snakes, which led to the reduction of snakebites.

== Mayor of Panjim (1938–1945) ==
In 1926, Mello was elected as a member of parliament to represent Portuguese India in Lisbon. However, after the 28 May 1926 coup d'état, the elections were nullified and not held again for the next nineteen years. Mello served as the mayor of Panjim from 1938 to 1945. During his tenure as mayor, he cleansed its stables of mismanagement and fiscal deficits, and his mayorship is widely noted for the city's urbanisation.

In 1940, Mello devised a plan for the beautification of the city, particularly the church square, the present 18 June road and the Campal Zone. The latter still bears the imprint of the program carried out by him. He organised the balustrade on the Mandovi River, from the centre of town up to Campal, lining the riverside avenue. He also planted trees in many of the streets of Panjim, with seeds of tropical trees from Cuba. These jacaranda and acacia trees, whose seedlings were planted in 1940, now provide shade to the streets which were originally lined only with coconut and ficus trees.

== Member of Parliament (1945–1949) ==
In 1945, when the Portuguese parliament was re-opened, Mello was elected for the second time as MP to represent Portuguese India. He was the only independent MP to serve in the Portuguese parliament for the period 1945–49; all the others being members of dictator António de Oliveira Salazar's União Nacional party. However, Mello's independent status brought him into disfavour with Salazar, and his speeches in the National Assembly were censored. Initially, Mello was staunchly pro-Portuguese and believed that Goa should remain under the Portuguese Empire. In November 1946, at a National Assembly meeting at Lisbon, he denounced the unrest in Goa as the handiwork of a few "Fifth Columnists and Nazis, and intellectuals educated in central Europe and fanatics who had failed in life, who preach the absorption of Goa and foment hatred of the Portuguese nation."

He worked tirelessly for the repeal of the discriminatory Portuguese Colonial Act of 1930, which had previously relegated non-Portuguese citizens to second-class status in the Empire. The repeal of this discriminatory act was unanimously approved by the National Assembly in 1950. With the repeal of the act granted, Mello now began to advocate independence for the Portuguese Indian colonies of Goa, Daman and Diu, which would govern itself as a separate national entity, but within the Portuguese Commonwealth. This put him at further odds with the ruling Estado Novo regime, which considered their Indian colonies to be an integral part of Portugal and dismissed any ideas of independence.

== Last years ==
After retiring to Goa, Mello was not put up as candidate for re-election through a political manoeuvre of the Salazar's single party regime. In 1950, when the Fifth International Congress of Microbiology was to take place in Petropolis, Brazil, Mello who had expected to be nominated as the delegate of Portugal, found out to his surprise that Salazar had instead appointed another delegation without him. When this came to be known, the Brazilian Government invited him, providing for his travel and stay.

Finding himself under increased political persecution by Salazar's government in Goa, Mello emigrated with his wife to Brazil in 1951, where three of their children were already settled. He settled down in São Paulo, where he continued his research in the field of Protozoa, in the intestines of termites. He discovered various new species there which he dedicated to his new country. He gave lectures and conferences in Rio de Janeiro and São Paulo and was invited to organise the section of protozoology at the Instituto Ezequiel Dias in Belo Horizonte. Mello died in São Paulo of lung cancer on 9 January 1955, aged 67. His last scientific paper, Memorias do Instituto Ezequiel Dias (Memoirs of the Ezequiel Dias Institute) was published in February 1955, a month after his death.

== Personal life ==
Mello was married twice. His first wife was Marie Eugenie Caillat, a Swiss woman from Geneva, who after marriage moved with him to Panjim. Eugenie was the first person to translate the works of Rabindranath Tagore into French. She died in 1921 from complications brought on by the Spanish flu virus in Porto. The couple did not have any children.

On 15 September 1923, Mello married his second wife Hedwig Bachmann, a young Swiss school teacher from Diessenhofen. They had six children: Alfredo, Eugeήia, Victor, Francisco Paulo, Cristina and Margarida. Hedwig authored a book entitled Von der Seele der Indischen Frau (Tipografia Rangel, Goa, 1941) published also in translation, On the soul of the Indian women. The book is a psycho-sociological study of Hindu traditions as interpreted from proverbs and the impact of Aryan and Dravidian civilisations. One of his sons, Alfredo Bachmann de Mello (1924–2010), was a well-known travel writer and memoirist who authored an auto-biography, From Goa to Patagonia: memoirs spanning times and spaces. Another son, Victor Froilano Bachmann de Mello (1927–2009), was a world-renowned geotechnical engineer.

== Selected work ==
=== Malaria ===
- Contribution to the study of Malaria in Goa, All India Sanitary Conference, Lucknow, 1914.
- Profilaxia malrica nas povoacoes rurais das Novas Conquistas, Primeira Conferencia Sanitaria de Goa, Panjim, 1914. Also in Boletim Geral de Medecina e Farmacia, Nova Goa, 1914.
- Alguns problemas sobre a malaria em Goa, Ibid., 1914.
- Rapport sur les resultats du traitement des divers etats du paludisme par la Smalarina du Prof. Cremonese, "Transactions of the VII Congress of the Far East Association of Tropical Medicine", Calcutta, 1928.
- Indicacoes do emprego da plasmoquina na terapeutica e profilaxia da malaria, Boletim Geral de Medecina e Farmacia, Panjim, 1929.
- Sur l'emploi de la plasmoquine dans le traitement du paludisme, Presse Médicale, Paris, September 1929.
- Sur une methode pour delimiter l'tendue des splenomegalies et enregistrer d'une faon precise leurs oscillations ulterieures, Bulletin Soc. Pathologie Exotique, Paris, 1929.
- O Fomento das Novas Conquistas e suas relaoes com os problemas de assitencia e saneamento, Terciero Congresso Colonial Nacional, Lisbon 1930. Also in Boletim Geral de Medecina e Farmacia, Nova Goa 1930.
- La plasmoquination en masse des localits malariennes et ses resultats prophylactiques, Bulletin Soc. Pathologie Exotique Paris, June 1931.
- A scheme for malarial sanitation in rural areas, The Antiseptic, Madras, September 1933.
- Premiere Campagne Antimalarienne active E0 Goa, Arquivo da Escola Medico Cirugica, Nova Goa, Seria B, 1934.
- Nota final sobre a presente campana anti-palustre. – Ibid,, 1934.
- On the mass chemoprophylaxis of malarial areas and its practical results, Medicina, Lisbon, 1935.
- Sobre a Chimiprofilaxia das localidades malricas e seus resultados praticos aps dois anos de experiencia pessoal, Jornadas Medicas Galaico-Portuguesas, Orense, 1935. Also in Portugal Medico, Poro, May 1936.
- Experimental studies on the treatment of malarial splenomgalies by the method of Ascoli, South Africa Medical Journal, November 1938. Also in the Compt Rendues du Congres de 1st South Africa Medical Association, Lourenco Marques, 1939.
- Experiences cliniques sur le traitement des splenomgalies palustres par la methode d'Ascoli, A Medecina Contemporanea, Lisbon, November 1938.
- La campagne antimalarienne dans les regions rurales de e Portugaise, Rivista Malariologia, Rome, 1938.
- O problema da endemia malarica na India Portuguesa, Clinica, Higiene e Hidrologia, Lisbon, 1936.
- Treatment of malaria with special reference to the chemoprophylaxis of malaria in Portuguese India, South African Medical Journal, December 1938. Also in O Medico, Nova Goa, 1939.
- Resultats de 5 ans d'experience personelle sur la prophylaxie quinosynthtique des regions a haute endmicit palustre, Acta Conventius Tertii de Tropicis ut que Malaria Morbis (Congress of Amsterdam, 1938).
- A orientação da campanha antimalárica nas Novas Conquista, seus resultados practicos e a liao que delas deriva para a nossa conducta futura, A Medecina Contemporanea, Lisbon, August 1937, Also in Boletim Geral de Medecina e Farmacia, Nova Goa, 1938.

=== Tuberculosis ===
- Estado Actual da Ciencia sobre a tuberculose pulmonar, Boletim Geral de Medecina e Farmacia, Nova Goa, 1912.
- Une nouvelle conception sur le mode d'action des tuberculines, Ibid., 1913.
- Um caso de antracose pulmonar simulando a tuberculose, Ibid., 1917.
- Un programe a suivre dans la declaration obligatoire de la tuberculose a l'Inde Portugaise, Revue d'hygiene et police Sanitaire, Paris, 1914.
- Conferencia Provincial sobre a Tuberculose, Boletim Geral de Medecina e Farmacia, Nova Goa, 1934.

=== Leprosy ===
- Traitement de la lepre, Presse Médicale, Paris, 1921.
- Estado actual de Quimiterapia antileprosa, A Medecina Ibera, Madrid, 1925.
- Breves consideraoes sobre o estado actul da Quimioterapia anti-leprosa (com impressoes clinicas pessoais sobre algumas das medicaoes preconizadas)-- communicated to the Congreso Luso Espanhol meeting in Coimbra, Boletim Geral de Medecina e Farmacia, Nova Goa, 1925.
- Etat actuel de chimiotherapie antilepreuse, Presse Médicale, Paris, 1925.
- Primeira Conferencia da Lepra na India Portuguesa, Arquivos Indo Portugueses de Medicina e Historia Natural, Vol. IV, 1927.
- Wie soll die Lepra bekampft werden, Die Medizin Welt, Berlin, October 1928.
- Une croisade internationale, combattant la Lepre, simultanement dans tous les pays, pourrait eteindre ce fleau en quelques decades, Cogres de Medicine Tropicale du Caire, 1928.
- Le probleme de la lepre dans l'Inde Portugaise, Revue D'hygiene et de Medicine Preventive NBA V, Paris, 1931
- Treatment of Leprosy by intravenous injections of pure Chaulmogra oil, Medical Digest, Bombay, August 1935.
- A campanha anti leprosa na India Portuguesa, Arquivo da Escola Medico Cirugica, Nova Goa, Serie B, 1915.
- Traitement de la lepre d'apres 3 ans d'experience personelle, XI Congres International de Dermatologie de Budapest, 1935
- Como eu trato os meus leprosos (conclusoes baseadas em 3 anos de experiencias na Leprosaria Central de Macasana), Jornadas Medicas Galaico-Portuguesas, Orense, 1935. Also in Portugal Medico, Porto, 1936.
- Leprosaria Central de Goa (Relatorio), Arquivo da Escola Medico Cirugica, Nova Goa, Serie B, 1937
- Traitement et guerison de la Lepre, II Semaine Medicale Internationale, Montreux, 1935.
- O problema da Lepra. Como se deve agir e como eu agi na nossa India – Lecture in the Liga da Profilaxia Social, Porto, Volume das Conferencias, 1939. Also in Boletim Geral de Medecina e Farmacia, Nova Goa, 1938.
