= Equity & Excellence in Education =

- Discipline: Social science
- Language: English

Publication details
- Publisher: Taylor & Francis
- Frequency: 4/year

Standard abbreviations
- ISO 4: Equity Excell. Educ.

Indexing
- ISSN: 1066-5684 (print); 1547-3457 (web)

Links
- Journal homepage

Equity & Excellence in Education is a peer-reviewed open access academic journal. It was founded in 1960 and is published by Taylor & Francis. It is indexed in services including IBZ and ERIC.

In the "Aims and Scope", the editors "recommend that prior to submitting a manuscript to the Journal, authors read the freely accessible editorial to Volume 54, Issue 1: 'Call Us by Our Names: A Kitchen-Table Dialogue on Doin' It for the Culture'."

As of April 2022 the journal's three most-read articles are: "Five Essential Components for Social Justice Education", "From Classmates to Inmates: An Integrated Approach to Break the School-to-Prison Pipeline" and "I’m Here for the Hard Re-Set: Post Pandemic Pedagogy to Preserve Our Culture".
