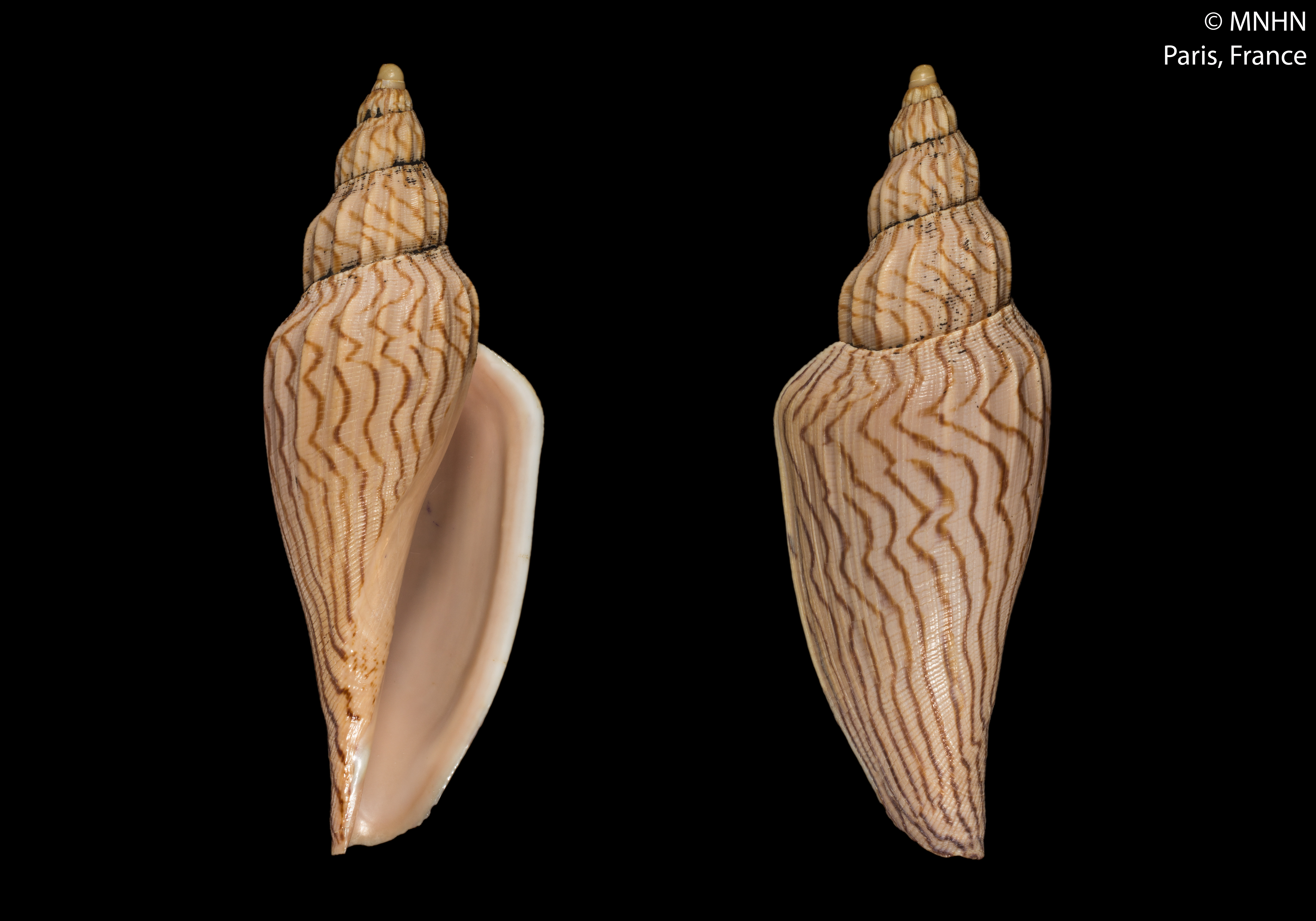
- Shell of Fulgoraria bailorum

Scientific classification
- Kingdom: Animalia
- Phylum: Mollusca
- Class: Gastropoda
- Subclass: Caenogastropoda
- Order: Neogastropoda
- Superfamily: Volutoidea
- Family: Volutidae
- Genus: Fulgoraria; Schumacher, 1817

Type species
- Fulgoraria chinensis Schumacher, 1817

Synonyms
- Fulgoraria (Fulgoraria) Schumacher, 1817· accepted, alternate representation; Fulgoraria (Kurodina) Rehder, 1969· accepted, alternate representation; Fulgoraria (Miopleiona) Dall, 1907; Fulgoraria (Musashia) Hayashi, 1966· accepted, alternate representation; Fulgoraria (Nipponomelon) Shikama, 1967· accepted, alternate representation; Fulgoraria (Psephaea) Crosse, 1871· accepted, alternate representation; Fulgoraria (Volutipysma) Rehder, 1969; Miopleiona Dall, 1907; Musashia Hayashi, 1966; Musashia (Nipponomelon) Shikama, 1967; Voluta (Fulgoraria) Schumacher, 1817; Voluta (Psephaea) Crosse, 1871

= Fulgoraria =

Genus of gastropods

Fulgoraria is a genus of sea snails, marine gastropod mollusks in the family Volutidae.

== Description ==
The shell is oblong and fusiform. The spire is acuminated. The apex is large, smooth and papillary. The whorls are longitudinally plicate and transversely striated. The body whorl is anteriorly contracted and acuminated. The aperture is elongated. The columella is sharp anteriorly, with from six to ten oblique plaits, the middle plaits are the largest. The outer lip is thickened, with the margin more or less crenate.

== Species ==
Species within the genus Fulgoraria include:

Subgenus Fulgoraria (Fulgoraria) Schumacher, 1817

- Fulgoraria alforum Thach, 2014
- Fulgoraria allanlimpusi Thach & Bail, 2018
- Fulgoraria baili Thach, 2018
- Fulgoraria bailorum Thach, 2014
- Fulgoraria callomoni Thach, 2015
- Fulgoraria ericarum Douté, 1997
- Fulgoraria hamillei (Crosse, 1869)
- Fulgoraria hitoshiikedai Thach & Bail, 2018
- Fulgoraria humerosa Rehder, 1969
- Fulgoraria kaoae Bail, 2008
- Fulgoraria leviuscula Rehder, 1969
- Fulgoraria limpusi Thach, 2020
- Fulgoraria ngai Thach, 2020
- Fulgoraria ngocngai Bail & Thach, 2017
- Fulgoraria patricebaili Thach, 2017
- Fulgoraria phanhayi Thach, 2020
- Fulgoraria philippsi Thach, 2016
- Fulgoraria rupestris (Gmelin, 1791)

Subgenus Fulgoraria (Kurodina) Rehder, 1969

- Fulgoraria smithi (Sowerby III, 1901)

Subgenus Fulgoraria (Musashia) Hayashi, 1966

- Fulgoraria allaryi Bail, 2005
- Fulgoraria cancellata Kuroda & Habe, 1950
- Fulgoraria carnicolor Bail & Chino, 2010
- Fulgoraria chinoi Bail, 2000
- Fulgoraria clara (Sowerby III, 1914)
- Fulgoraria formosana Azuma, 1967
- Fulgoraria hirasei (Sowerby III, 1912)
- Fulgoraria noguchii Hayashi, 1960

Subgenus Fulgoraria (Nipponomelon) Shikama, 1967

- Fulgoraria elongata Shikama, 1962
- Fulgoraria megaspira (Sowerby I, 1844)

Subgenus Fulgoraria (Psephaea) Crosse, 1871

- Fulgoraria concinna (Broderip, 1836)
- Fulgoraria daviesi (Fulton, 1938)
- Fulgoraria kamakurensis Okuta, 1949
- Fulgoraria kaneko Hirase, 1922
- Fulgoraria mentiens (Fulton, 1940)

Species brought into synonymy

- Fulgoraria delicata (Fulton, 1940): synonym of Saotomea (Saotomea) delicata (Fulton, 1940)
- Fulgoraria minima Bondarev, 1994: synonym of Saotomea (Bondarevia) minima (Bondarev, 1994)
- Fulgoraria pratasensis Lan, 1997: synonym of Saotomea (Saotomea) pratasensis Lan, 1997
- Fulgoraria solida Bail & Chino, 2000: synonym of Saotomea (Saotomea) solida (Bail & Chino, 2000)
