= F. concinna =

F. concinna may refer to:

- Ficus concinna, a fig tree
- Fissurella concinna, a sea snail
- Fulgoraria concinna, a sea snail
- Fungia concinna, a plate coral
