= F. maxima =

F. maxima may refer to:

- Ficus maxima, a fig tree
- Fissurella maxima, a keyhole limpet
