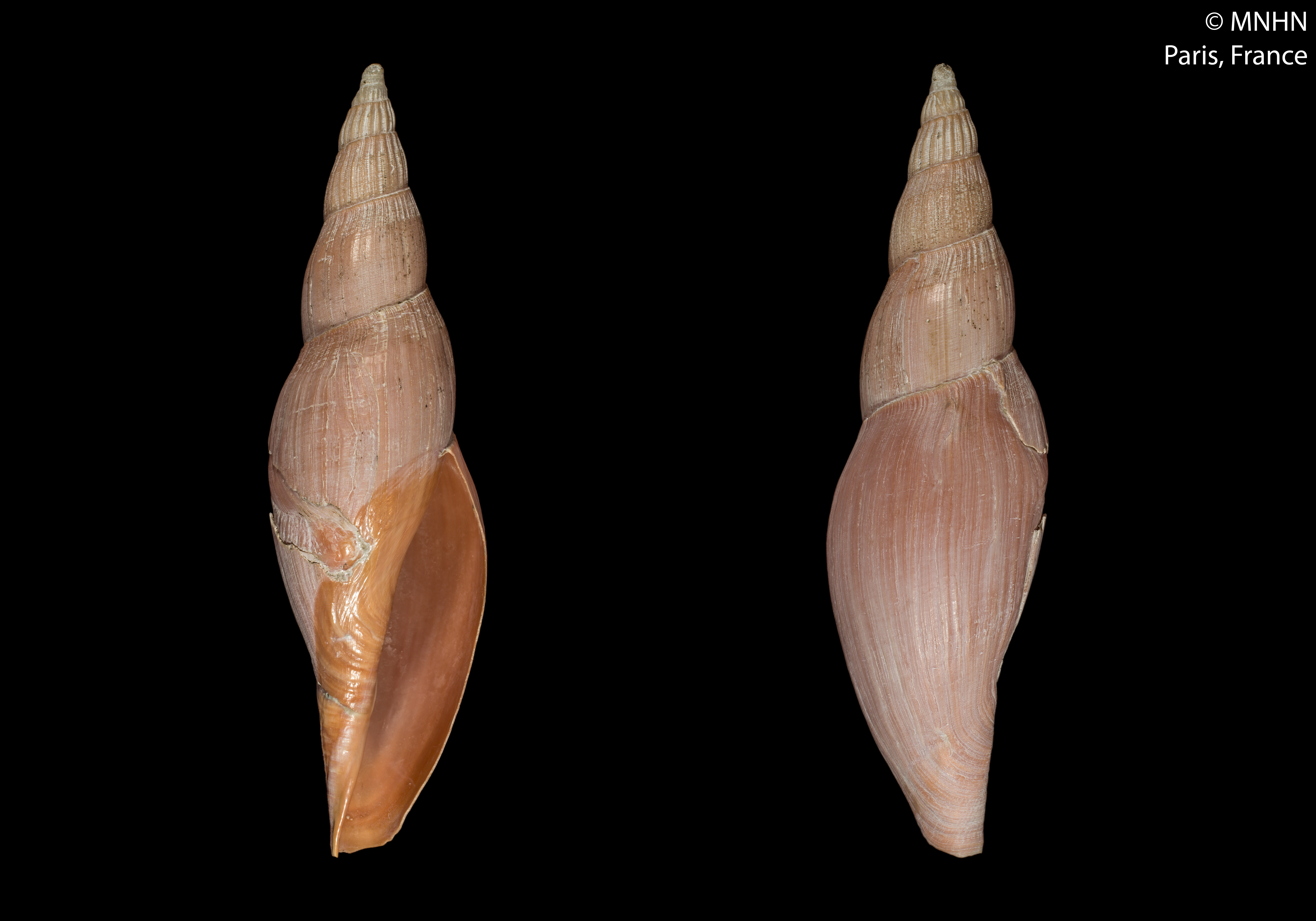

Scientific classification
- Kingdom: Animalia
- Phylum: Mollusca
- Class: Gastropoda
- Subclass: Caenogastropoda
- Order: Neogastropoda
- Superfamily: Volutoidea
- Family: Volutidae
- Genus: Fulgoraria
- Species: F. baili

Binomial name
- Fulgoraria baili Thach, 2018

Synonyms
- Fulgoraria (Musashia) baili

= Fulgoraria baili =

Species of Fulgoraria

Fulgoraria baili is a species of Fulgoraria, a genus of sea snails in the subfamily Fulgorariinae of the family Volutidae.

== Distribution ==
It is found in the South China Sea, near Vietnam.
