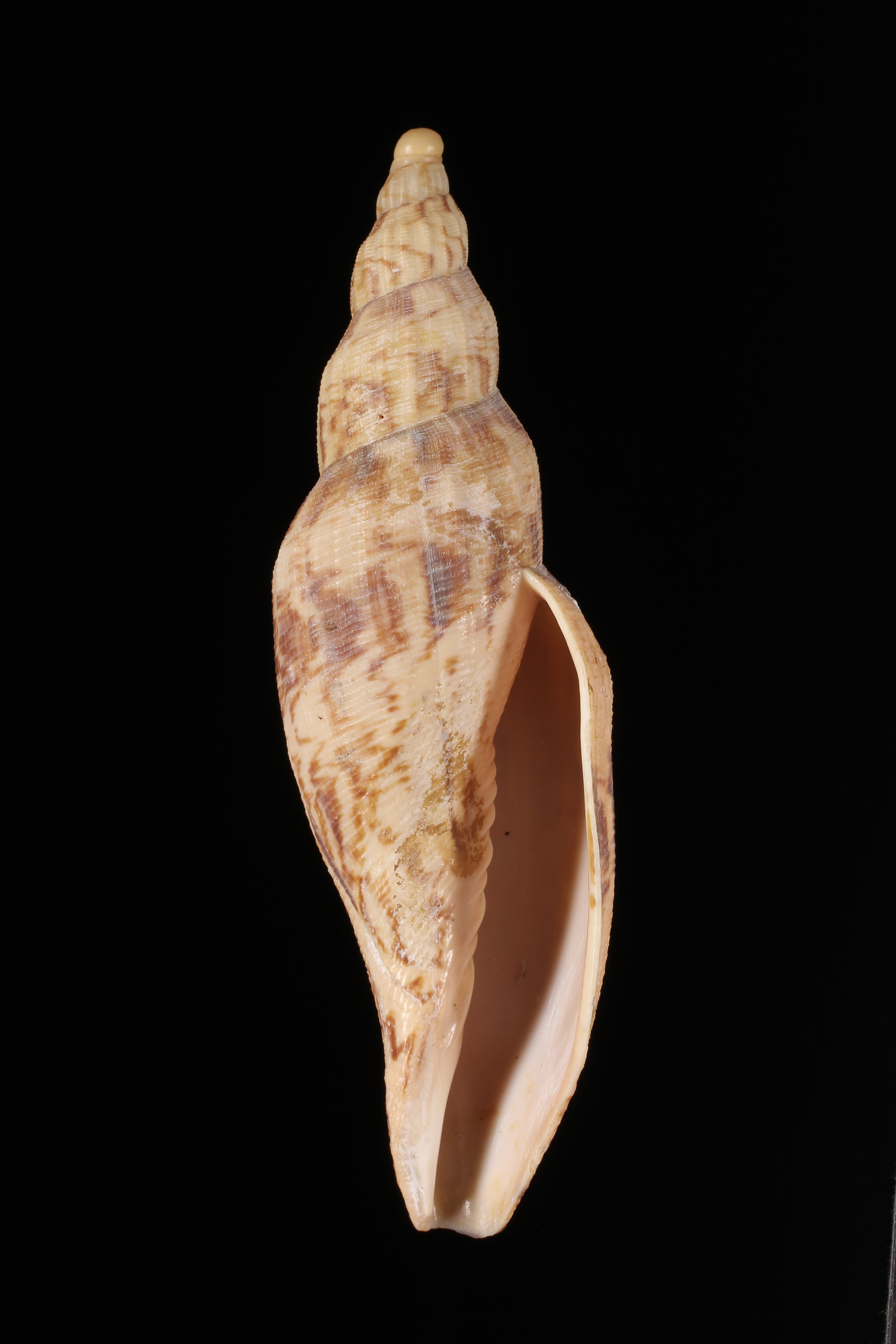
- Shell of Fulgoraria hamillei huberi (holotype at MNHN, Paris)

Scientific classification
- Kingdom: Animalia
- Phylum: Mollusca
- Class: Gastropoda
- Subclass: Caenogastropoda
- Order: Neogastropoda
- Family: Volutidae
- Genus: Fulgoraria
- Subgenus: Fulgoraria (Fulgoraria)
- Species: F. hamillei

Binomial name
- Fulgoraria hamillei (Crosse, 1869)

Synonyms
- Fulgoraria (Fulgoraria) hamillei (Crosse, 1869)· accepted, alternate representation; Fulgoraria (Fulgoraria) hamillei nipponkaiensis Shikama, 196; Fulgoraria (Fulgoraria) hamillei sinica Shikama, 1967; Fulgoraria (Fulgoraria) hamillei tosaensis Shikama, 1967; Fulgoraria (Fulgoraria) hamillei var. nipponkaiensis Shikama, 1967; Fulgoraria (Fulgoraria) hamillei var. tosaensis Shikama, 1967

= Fulgoraria hamillei =

Species of gastropod

Fulgoraria hamillei is a species of sea snail, a marine gastropod mollusk in the family Volutidae, the volutes.

Subspecies

- Fulgoraria hamillei hamillei (Crosse, 1869)
- Fulgoraria hamillei huberi Thach, 2020
