= Fulgoraria kaneko =

Scientific classification
- Kingdom: Animalia
- Phylum: Mollusca
- Class: Gastropoda
- Subclass: Caenogastropoda
- Order: Neogastropoda
- Family: Volutidae
- Genus: Fulgoraria
- Subgenus: Fulgoraria (Psephaea)
- Species: F. kaneko

Binomial name
- Fulgoraria kaneko Hirase, 1922

Synonyms
- Fulgoraria yamamotoi Shikama, 196

Species of gastropod

Fulgoraria kaneko is a species of sea snail, a marine gastropod mollusk in the family Volutidae, the volutes.
