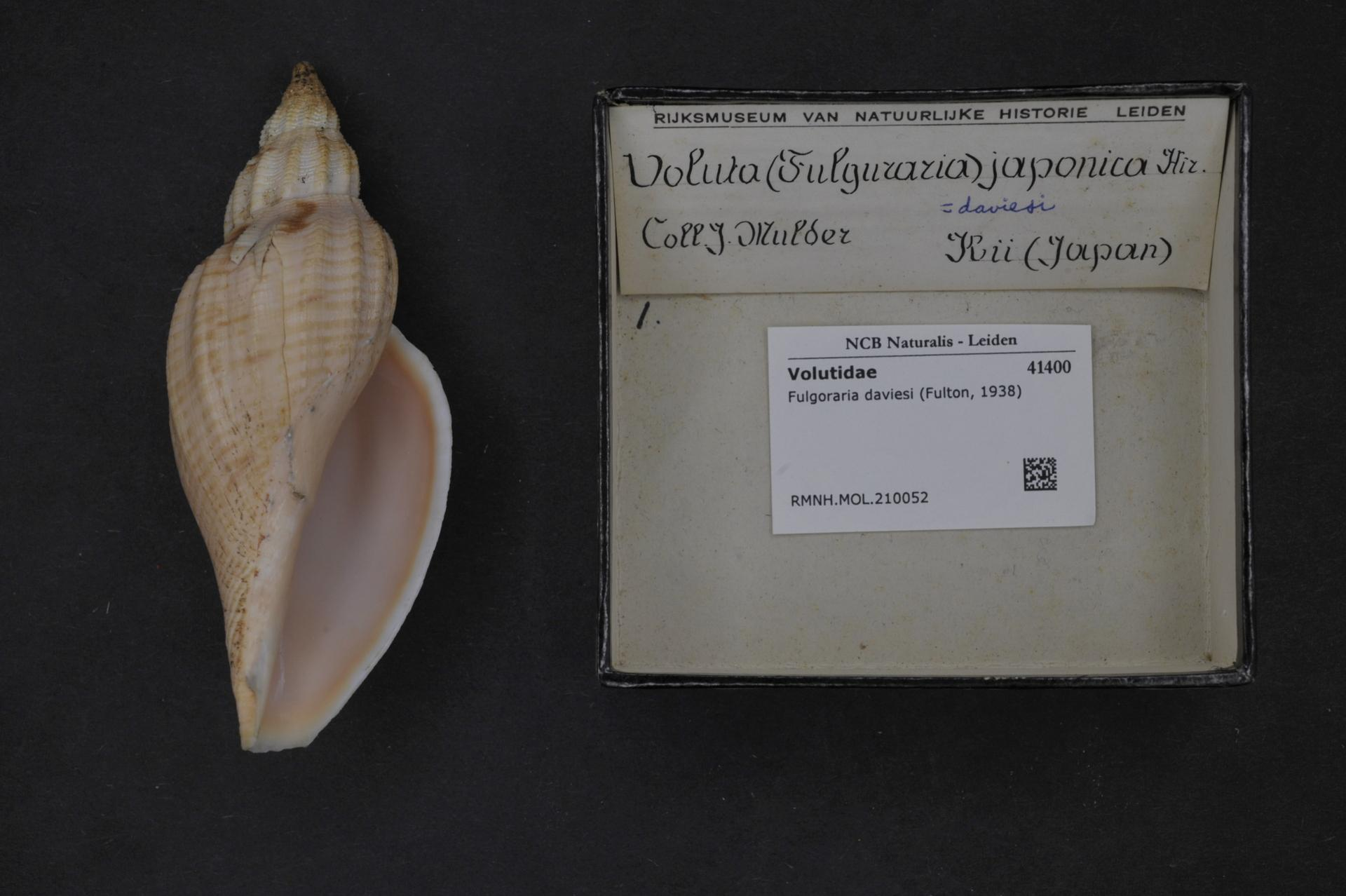
- Fulgoraria daviesi shell

Scientific classification
- Kingdom: Animalia
- Phylum: Mollusca
- Class: Gastropoda
- Subclass: Caenogastropoda
- Order: Neogastropoda
- Family: Volutidae
- Genus: Fulgoraria
- Subgenus: Fulgoraria (Psephaea)
- Species: F. daviesi

Binomial name
- Fulgoraria daviesi (Fulton, 1938)

= Fulgoraria daviesi =

Species of gastropod

Fulgoraria daviesi is a species of sea snail, a marine gastropod mollusk in the family Volutidae, the volutes.
