= Fulgoraria mentiens =

Scientific classification
- Kingdom: Animalia
- Phylum: Mollusca
- Class: Gastropoda
- Subclass: Caenogastropoda
- Order: Neogastropoda
- Family: Volutidae
- Genus: Fulgoraria
- Subgenus: Fulgoraria (Psephaea)
- Species: F. mentiens

Binomial name
- Fulgoraria mentiens (Fulton, 1940)

Species of gastropod

Fulgoraria mentiens is a species of sea snail, a marine gastropod mollusk in the family Volutidae, the volutes.
