= Fulgoraria kamakurensis =

Scientific classification
- Kingdom: Animalia
- Phylum: Mollusca
- Class: Gastropoda
- Subclass: Caenogastropoda
- Order: Neogastropoda
- Family: Volutidae
- Genus: Fulgoraria
- Subgenus: Fulgoraria (Psephaea)
- Species: F. kamakurensis

Binomial name
- Fulgoraria kamakurensis Okuta, 1949

Species of gastropod

Fulgoraria kamakurensis is a species of sea snail, a marine gastropod mollusk in the family Volutidae, the volutes.
