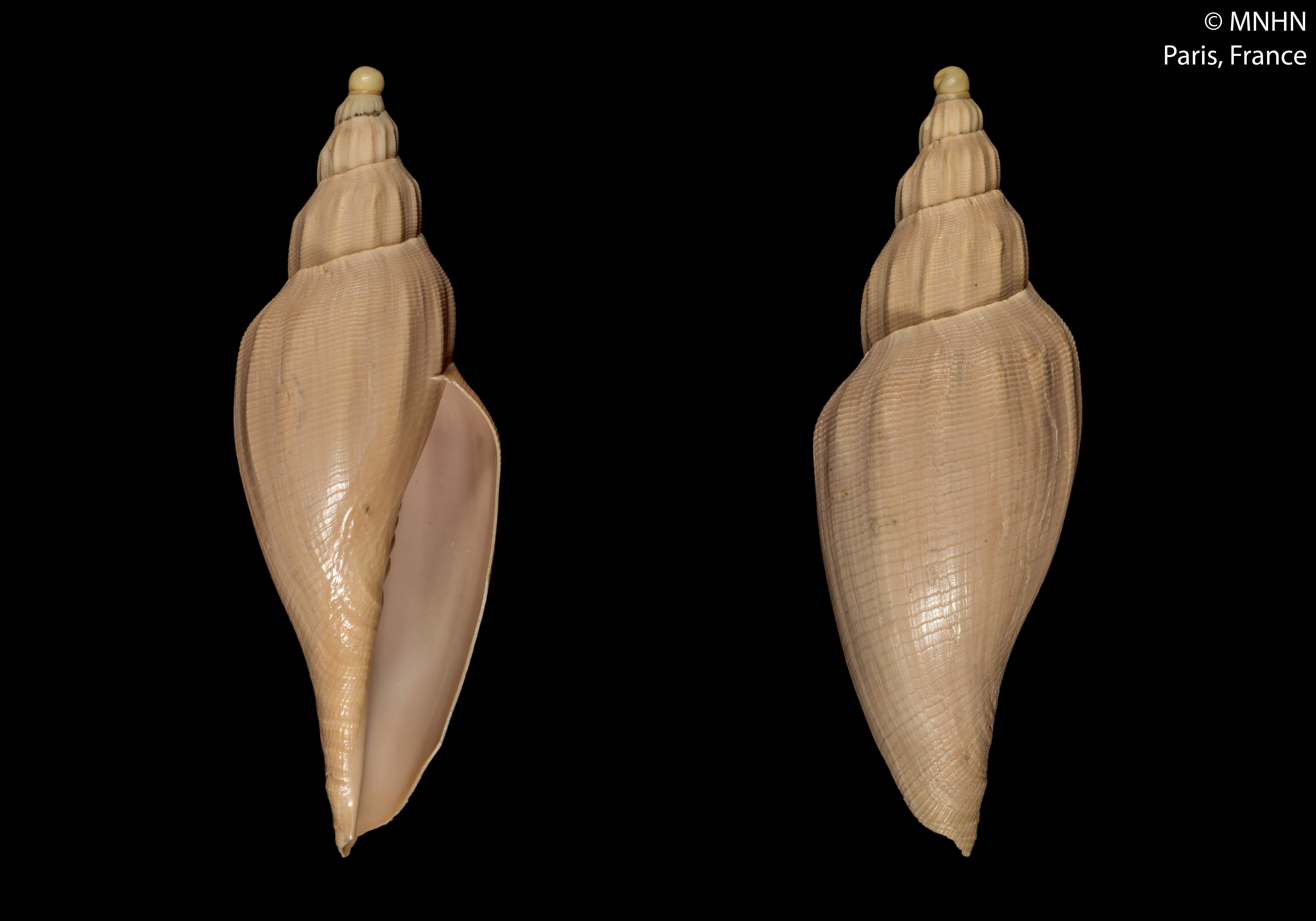
- Preserved specimen for Museum national d'Histoire naturelle collection (2020)

Scientific classification
- Kingdom: Animalia
- Phylum: Mollusca
- Class: Gastropoda
- Subclass: Caenogastropoda
- Order: Neogastropoda
- Family: Volutidae
- Genus: Fulgoraria
- Subgenus: Fulgoraria (Fulgoraria)
- Species: F. hitoshiikedai

Binomial name
- Fulgoraria hitoshiikedai Thach & Bail, 2018

Synonyms
- Fulgoraria (Fulgoraria) hitoshiikedai Thach & Bail, 2018 · alternate representation

= Fulgoraria hitoshiikedai =

Species of sea snail

Fulgoraria hitoshiikedai is a species of sea snail, a marine gastropod mollusc in the family Volutidae, the volutes.

It was first described by Nguyên Ngoc Thach in 2018 from a specimen collected in the coastal waters off Vietnam.
