= Fulgoraria noguchii =

Scientific classification
- Kingdom: Animalia
- Phylum: Mollusca
- Class: Gastropoda
- Subclass: Caenogastropoda
- Order: Neogastropoda
- Family: Volutidae
- Genus: Fulgoraria
- Subgenus: Fulgoraria (Musashia)
- Species: F. noguchii

Binomial name
- Fulgoraria noguchii Hayashi, 1960

Species of gastropod

Fulgoraria noguchii is a species of sea snail, a marine gastropod mollusk in the family Volutidae, the volutes.

== Distribution ==
Japanese Exclusive Economic Zone
