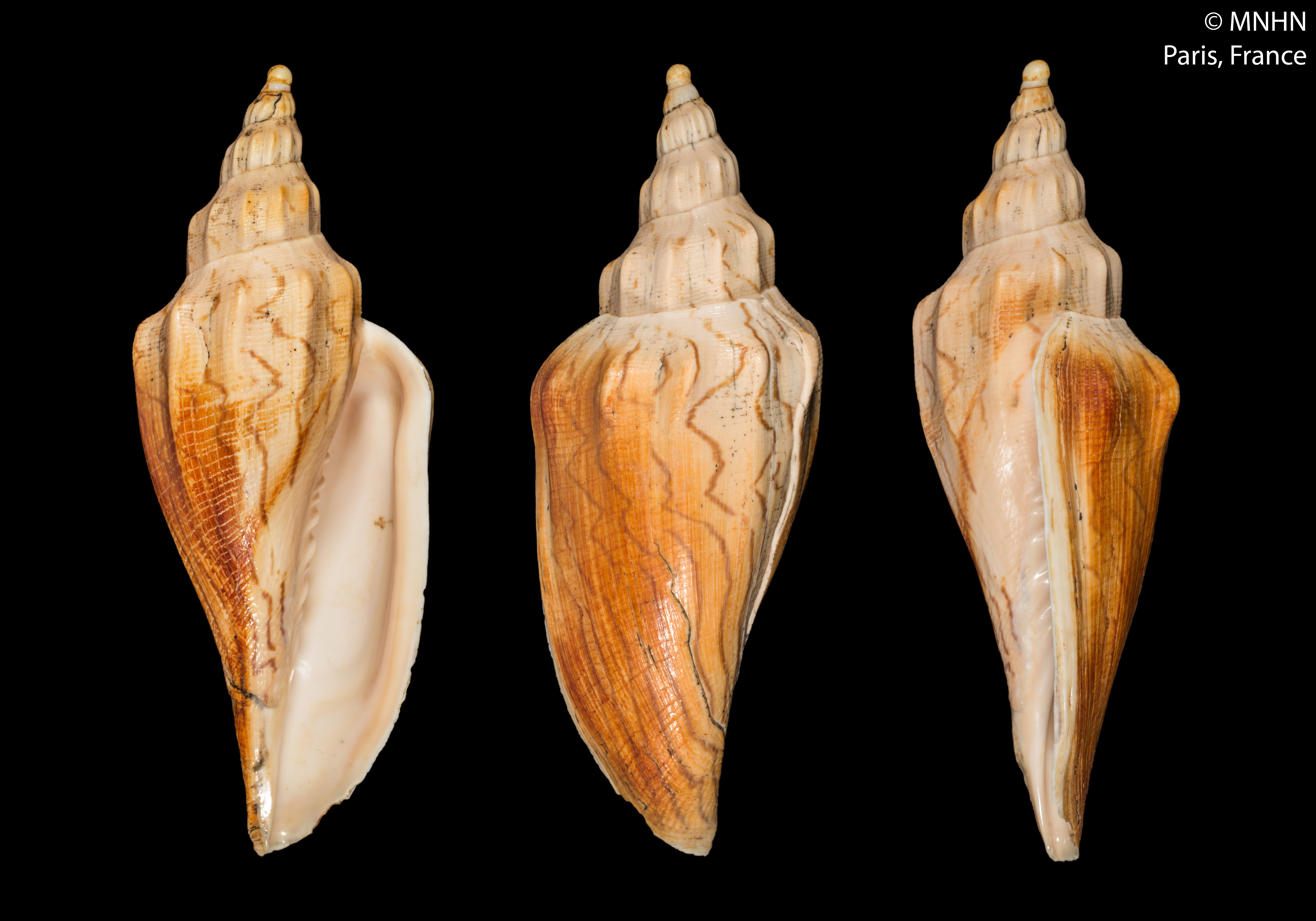
- Shell of Fulgoraria alforum

Scientific classification
- Kingdom: Animalia
- Phylum: Mollusca
- Class: Gastropoda
- Subclass: Caenogastropoda
- Order: Neogastropoda
- Superfamily: Volutoidea
- Family: Volutidae
- Subfamily: Fulgorariinae; Pilsbry & Olsson 1954

= Fulgorariinae =

Subfamily of gastropods

The subfamily Fulgorariinae contains sea snails, marine gastropod mollusks in the family Volutidae.

== Description ==
They are characterized by a uniserial radula with tricuspid teeth. Lateral cusps are thickest along the lateral edge, broader and generally longer than the central cusps. The protoconch is large or small, papilliform and often tilted on its vertical axis. Shells are fusiform and show numerous irregular columellar plaits.

== Distribution ==
Most of the species thrive in the benthic zone between 100 and 300 m on mud and shell grit substrate. Rare bathyal species are brought up from 800 to 1000 m. The distribution of the Fulgorariinae extends along the East coast of Asia, from throughout Japan except the Okhotsk Sea, the Pacific coast, the Japan Sea, the East China Sea and the South China Sea down to the coast of Vietnam.

== Fossil History ==
Some fulgorariid fossils can be traced back to the Oligocene, but possible ancestors of recent species only appeared during the Pliocene only with an abrupt increase after the Late Pliocene, in which almost all the recent species were established. Though recent species are now restricted to the Asian Margin of the Pacific Ocean, from Hokkaido, Japan to Vietnam, fossil studies show that species belonging to that subfamily occurred along both the eastern and the western margins of the northern Pacific Ocean. Five taxa, related to the subgenus Psephaea, are described from the Paleocene strata of California, from the lower Miocene to the Pliocene.

== Systematic arrangement ==
In Volutidae, the absence of planktotrophic development (in most groups) does not allow exchange of genetic material between geographically separate populations. Thus, local inbreeding involves a high tendency to speciation.

Genera and subgenera within the Fulgorariinae:

- Fulgoraria Schumacher, 1817
- Saotomea Habe, 1943
  - Saotomea s.s.
  - Bondarevia Bail & Chino, 2010
- Tenebrincola Harasewych & Kantor, 1991
- † Wangaluta Stilwell, 2016

Synonyms

- Miopleiona Dall, 1907 accepted as Fulgoraria (Psephaea) Crosse, 1871 : synonym of Fulgoraria Schumacher, 1817
- Musashia Hayashi, 1966 accepted as Fulgoraria (Musashia) Hayashi, 1966: synonym of Fulgoraria Schumacher, 1817
