= Fulgoraria clara =

Scientific classification
- Kingdom: Animalia
- Phylum: Mollusca
- Class: Gastropoda
- Subclass: Caenogastropoda
- Order: Neogastropoda
- Family: Volutidae
- Genus: Fulgoraria
- Subgenus: Fulgoraria (Musashia)
- Species: F. clara

Binomial name
- Fulgoraria clara (Sowerby III, 1914)

Species of gastropod

Fulgoraria clara is a species of sea snail, a marine gastropod mollusk in the family Volutidae, the volutes.
