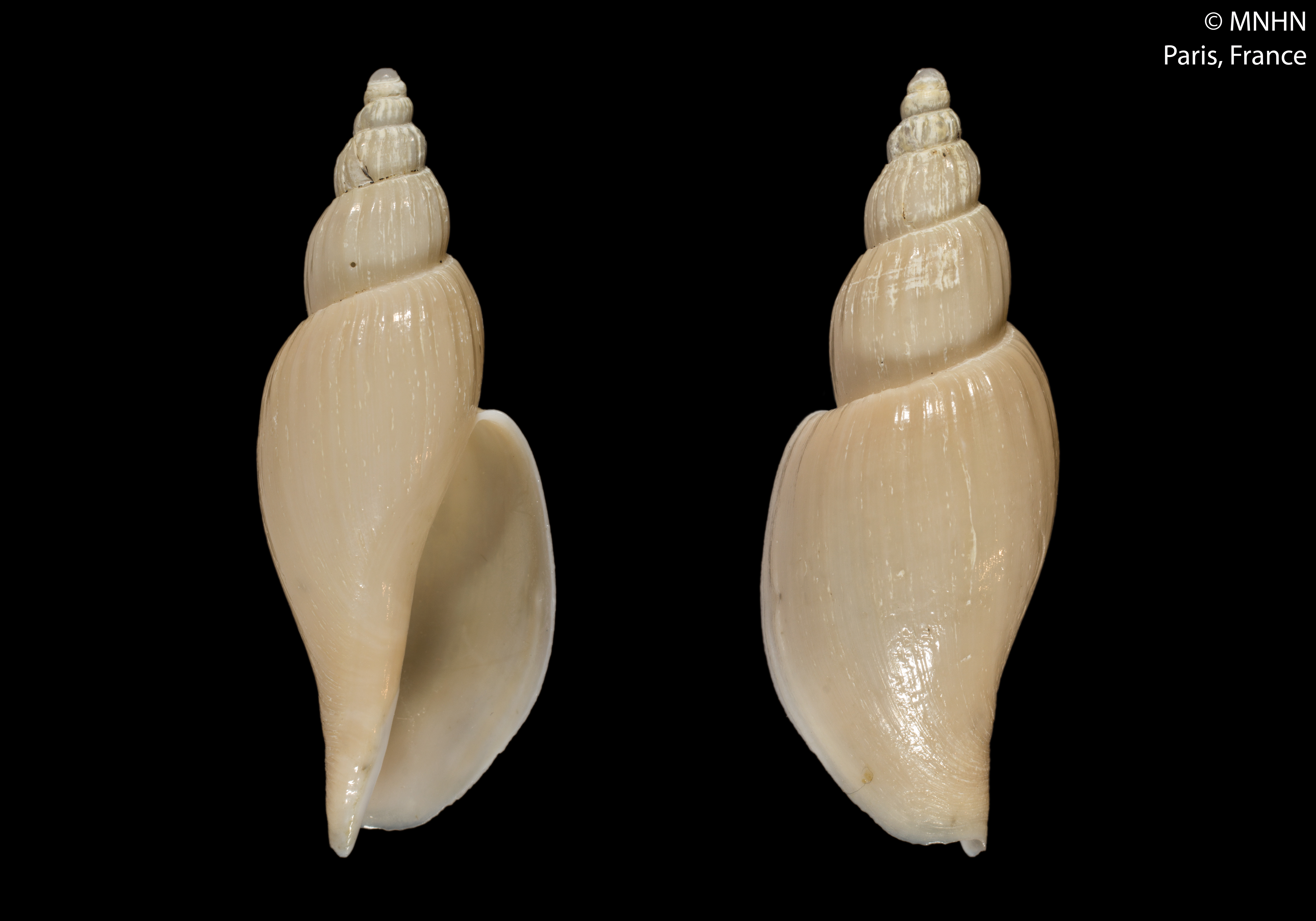
- Shell of Saotomea pratasensis (holotype at MNHN, Paris)

Scientific classification
- Kingdom: Animalia
- Phylum: Mollusca
- Class: Gastropoda
- Subclass: Caenogastropoda
- Order: Neogastropoda
- Family: Volutidae
- Subfamily: Fulgorariinae
- Genus: Saotomea; Habe, 1943

Type species
- Voluta delicata Fulton, 1940

Synonyms
- Fulgoraria (Saotomea) Habe, 1943; Saotomea (Bondarevia) Bail & Chino, 2010; Saotomea (Saotomea) Habe, 1943 · accepted, alternate representation

= Saotomea =

Genus of gastropods

Saotomea is a genus of sea snails, marine gastropod mollusks in the subfamily Fulgorariinae of the family Volutidae.

== Species ==
Species within the genus Saotomea include:

Subgenus Saotomea (Bondarevia) Bail & Chino, 2009

- Saotomea minima (Bondarev, 1994)

Subgenus Saotomea (Saotomea) Habe, 1943

- Saotomea delicata (Fulton, 1940)
- Saotomea hinae Bail & Chino, 2010
- Saotomea pratasensis Lan, 1997
- Saotomea solida Bail & Chino, 2000
