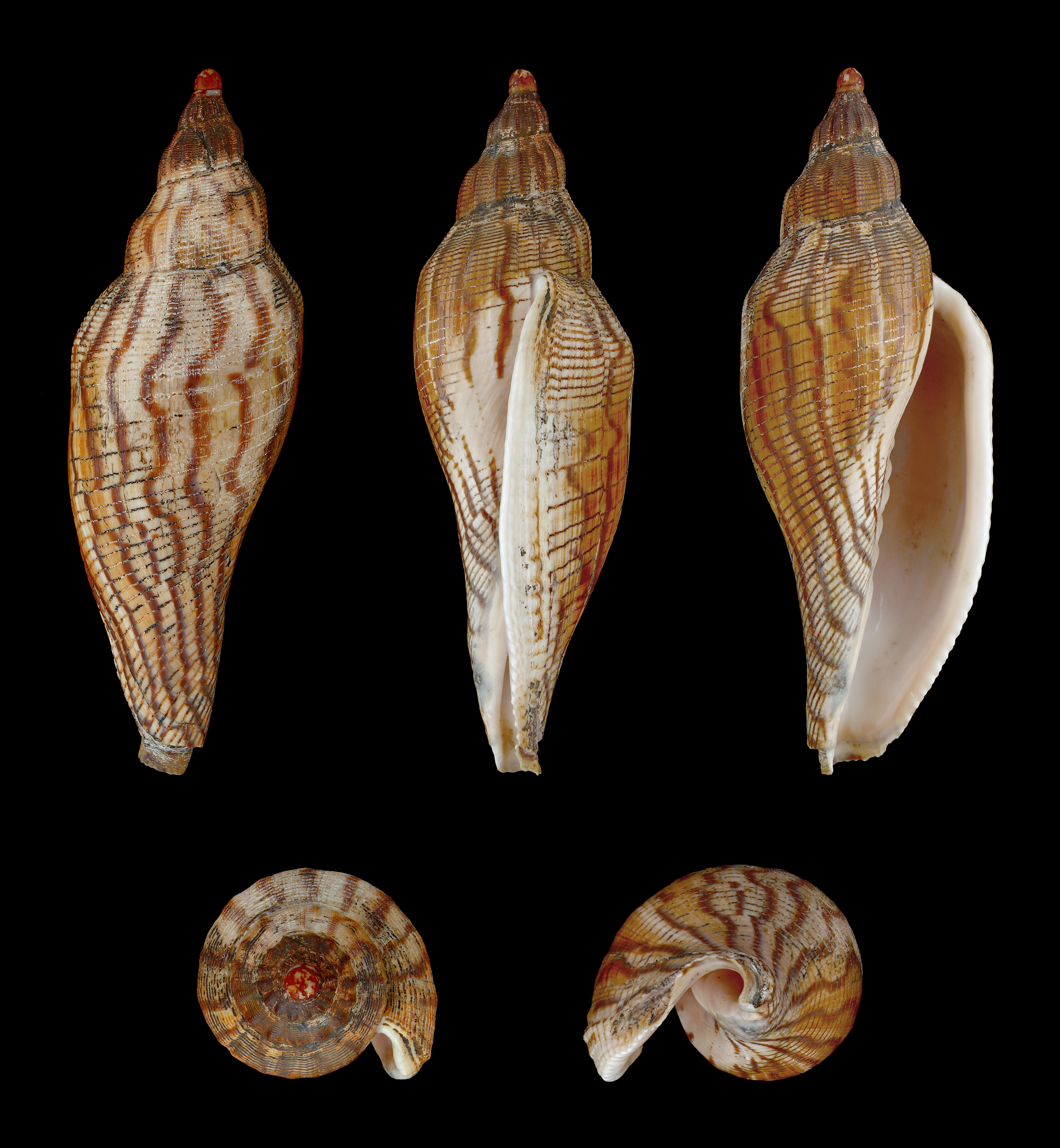
- Five views of a shell of Fulgoraria rupestris

Scientific classification
- Kingdom: Animalia
- Phylum: Mollusca
- Class: Gastropoda
- Subclass: Caenogastropoda
- Order: Neogastropoda
- Family: Volutidae
- Genus: Fulgoraria
- Subgenus: Fulgoraria (Fulgoraria)
- Species: F. rupestris

Binomial name
- Fulgoraria rupestris (Gmelin, 1791)

Synonyms
- Fulgoraria (Fulgoraria) rupestris (Gmelin, 1791)· accepted, alternate representation; Fulgoraria (Fulgoraria) rupestris aurantia (Shikama & Kosuge, 1970); Fulgoraria chinensis Schumacher, 1817; Fulgoraria fulgura Martini & Adams, 1853; Voluta capitata Perry, 1811; Voluta fulminata Lamarck, 1811; Voluta rupestris Gmelin, 1791 (original combination)

= Fulgoraria rupestris =

Species of gastropod

Fulgoraria (Fulgoraria) rupestris, common name the Asian flame volute, is a species of sea snail, a marine gastropod mollusk in the family Volutidae, the volutes.

== Subspecies ==
- Fulgoraria (Fulgoraria) rupestris politohumerosa Shikama, 1968
- Fulgoraria (Fulgoraria) rupestris rupestris (Gmelin, 1791)
- Fulgoraria (Fulgoraria) rupestris thachi Bail & Chino, 2010
- The forma Fulgoraria (Fulgoraria) rupestris f. aurantia Shikama & Kosuge, 1970 is a synonym of Fulgoraria (Fulgoraria) rupestris rupestris (Gmelin, 1791)

== Distribution ==
This marine species occurs in the demersal zone off Japan, Taiwan, China and Vietnam.

== Description ==
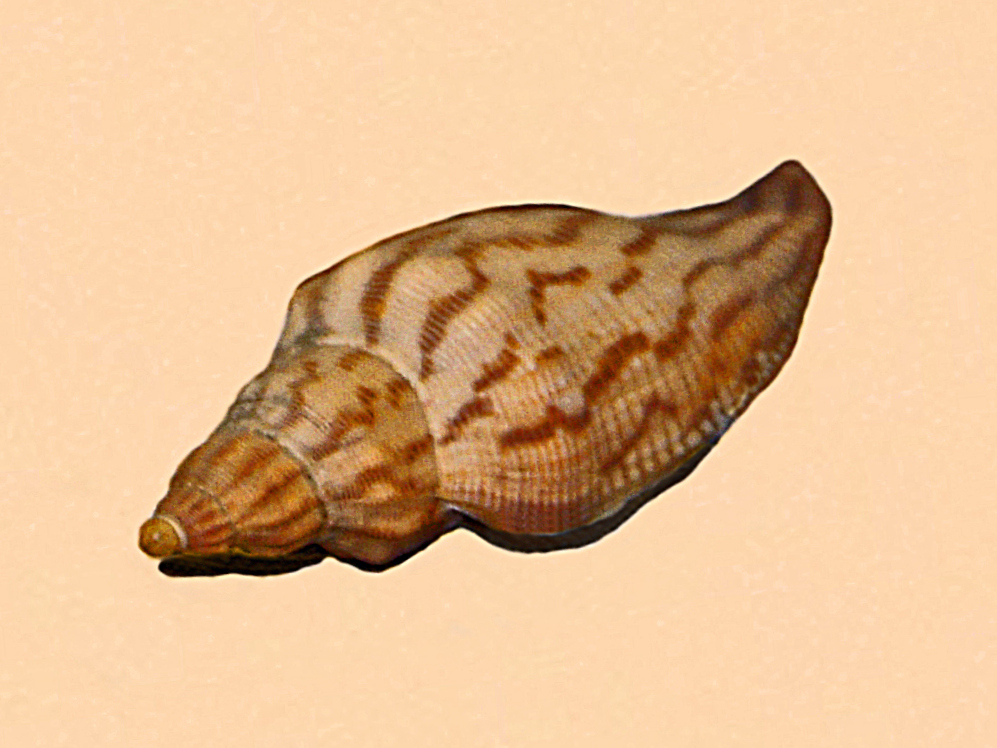
A shell of Fulgoraria rupestris

The size of an adult shell varies between 70 mm and 146 mm. The oblong-fusiform shell has a yellowish flesh-color, with zigzagged longitudinal chestnut lines. The spire is moderately elongated, terminating in a papillary summit with the apex lateral, instead of central and vertical as usual in spiral shells. The surface is plicate longitudinally, crossed by engraved revolving lines. There are six or seven columellar plaits. The outer lip is thickened within, its margin slightly crenulate. The interior of the aperture has also a flesh-color.

== Life cycle ==
Embryos develop into free-swimming planktonic marine larvae (trochophore) and later into juvenile veligers.

== Bibliography ==
- Bail, P & Poppe, G. T. 2001. A conchological iconography: a taxonomic introduction of the recent Volutidae. Hackenheim-Conchbook, 30 pp, 5 pl. (updated October 2008 for WoRMS)
- Bail P. & Chino M. (2010) The family Volutidae. The endemic Far East Asian subfamily Fulgorariinae Pilsbry & Olsson, 1954: A revision of the Recent species. A conchological iconography (G.T. Poppe & K. Groh, eds). Hackenheim: Conchbooks.
- Hsi-Jen Tao - Shells of Taiwan Illustrated in Colour
- Harald Douté, M. A. Fontana Angioy - Volutes, The Doute collection
- Ngoc-Thach Nguyên - Shells of Vietnam
- Okutani, T. (ed.), Marine Mollusks in Japan. Tokai University Press, Tokyo, 519-521 (in Japanese)
