= Fulgoraria chinoi =

Scientific classification
- Kingdom: Animalia
- Phylum: Mollusca
- Class: Gastropoda
- Subclass: Caenogastropoda
- Order: Neogastropoda
- Family: Volutidae
- Genus: Fulgoraria
- Subgenus: Fulgoraria (Musashia)
- Species: F. chinoi

Binomial name
- Fulgoraria chinoi Bail, 2000

Species of gastropod

Fulgoraria chinoi is a species of sea snail, a marine gastropod mollusk in the family Volutidae, the volutes.
