= Fulgoraria cancellata =

Scientific classification
- Kingdom: Animalia
- Phylum: Mollusca
- Class: Gastropoda
- Subclass: Caenogastropoda
- Order: Neogastropoda
- Family: Volutidae
- Genus: Fulgoraria
- Subgenus: Fulgoraria (Musashia)
- Species: F. cancellata

Binomial name
- Fulgoraria cancellata Kuroda & Habe, 1950

Species of gastropod

Fulgoraria cancellata is a species of sea snail, a marine gastropod mollusk in the family Volutidae, the volutes.
