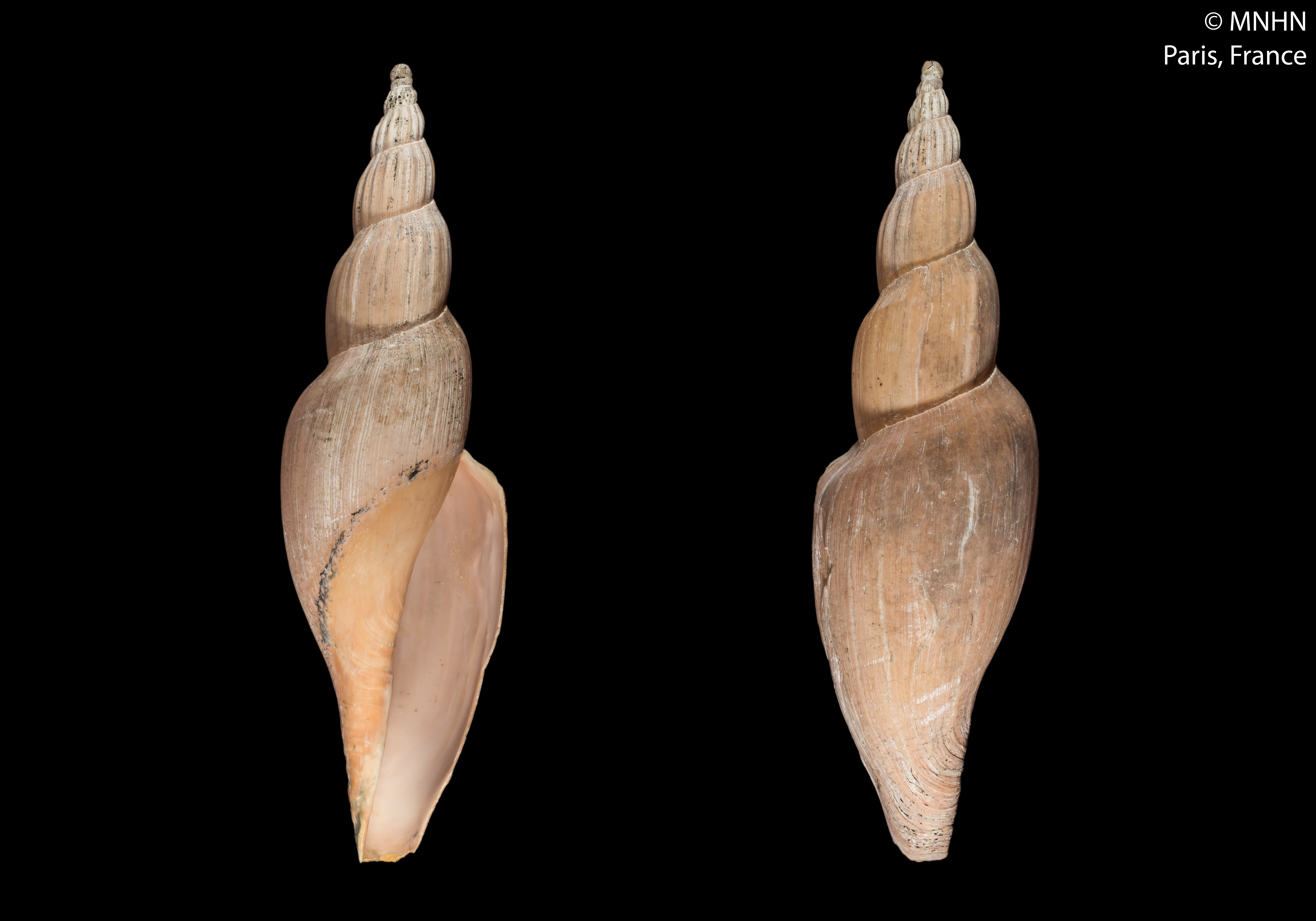
- Shell of Fulgoraria allaryi (holotype at MNHN, Paris)

Scientific classification
- Kingdom: Animalia
- Phylum: Mollusca
- Class: Gastropoda
- Subclass: Caenogastropoda
- Order: Neogastropoda
- Family: Volutidae
- Genus: Fulgoraria
- Subgenus: Fulgoraria (Musashia)
- Species: F. allaryi

Binomial name
- Fulgoraria allaryi Bail, 2005

Synonyms
- Fulgoraria (Musashia) allaryi Bail, 2005· accepted, alternate representation

= Fulgoraria allaryi =

Species of gastropod

Fulgoraria allaryi is a species of sea snail, a marine gastropod mollusk in the family Volutidae, the volutes.

== Description ==
A species of predatory sea snails known for the spiraling and curved features of their shell. The length of the shell attains 222.5 mm.

== Distribution ==
This species occurs in the South China Sea off Hainan, China
