= Fulgoraria humerosa =

Scientific classification
- Kingdom: Animalia
- Phylum: Mollusca
- Class: Gastropoda
- Subclass: Caenogastropoda
- Order: Neogastropoda
- Family: Volutidae
- Genus: Fulgoraria
- Subgenus: Fulgoraria (Fulgoraria)
- Species: F. humerosa

Binomial name
- Fulgoraria humerosa Rehder, 1969

Species of gastropod

Fulgoraria humerosa is a species of sea snail, a marine gastropod mollusc in the family Volutidae, the volutes.
