= Tenebrincola =

Scientific classification
- Kingdom: Animalia
- Phylum: Mollusca
- Class: Gastropoda
- Subclass: Caenogastropoda
- Order: Neogastropoda
- Family: Volutidae
- Genus: Tenebrincola; Harasewych & Kantor, 1991

Genus of gastropods

Tenebrincola is a genus of sea snails, marine gastropod mollusks in the family Volutidae. It is a Western Pacific abyssal genus, which is defined by a very thin, smooth shell, a radula of the fulgorarid type, and the presence of an operculum. Its phylogenetic relationship with the Asian fulgorarids needs to be clarified.

== Species ==
Species within the genus Tenebrincola include:

- Tenebrincola cukri (Rokop, 1972)

The species includes two populations: Tenebrincola cukri cukri (Rokop, 1972) - Baja California and Tenebrincola cukri frigida Harasewych & Kantor, 1991 - Aleutian Trench.
