= Fulgoraria smithi =

Scientific classification
- Kingdom: Animalia
- Phylum: Mollusca
- Class: Gastropoda
- Subclass: Caenogastropoda
- Order: Neogastropoda
- Family: Volutidae
- Genus: Fulgoraria
- Subgenus: Fulgoraria (Kurodina)
- Species: F. smithi

Binomial name
- Fulgoraria smithi (Sowerby III, 1901)

Synonyms
- Voluta uniplicata (Sowerby III, 1900)

Species of gastropod

Fulgoraria smithi is a species of sea snail, a marine gastropod mollusk in the family Volutidae, the volutes.
