= Tenebrincola cukri =

Scientific classification
- Kingdom: Animalia
- Phylum: Mollusca
- Class: Gastropoda
- Subclass: Caenogastropoda
- Order: Neogastropoda
- Family: Volutidae
- Genus: Tenebrincola
- Species: T. cukri

Binomial name
- Tenebrincola cukri (Rokop, 1972)

Species of gastropod

Tenebrincola cukri is a species of sea snail, a marine gastropod mollusk in the family Volutidae, the volutes.
