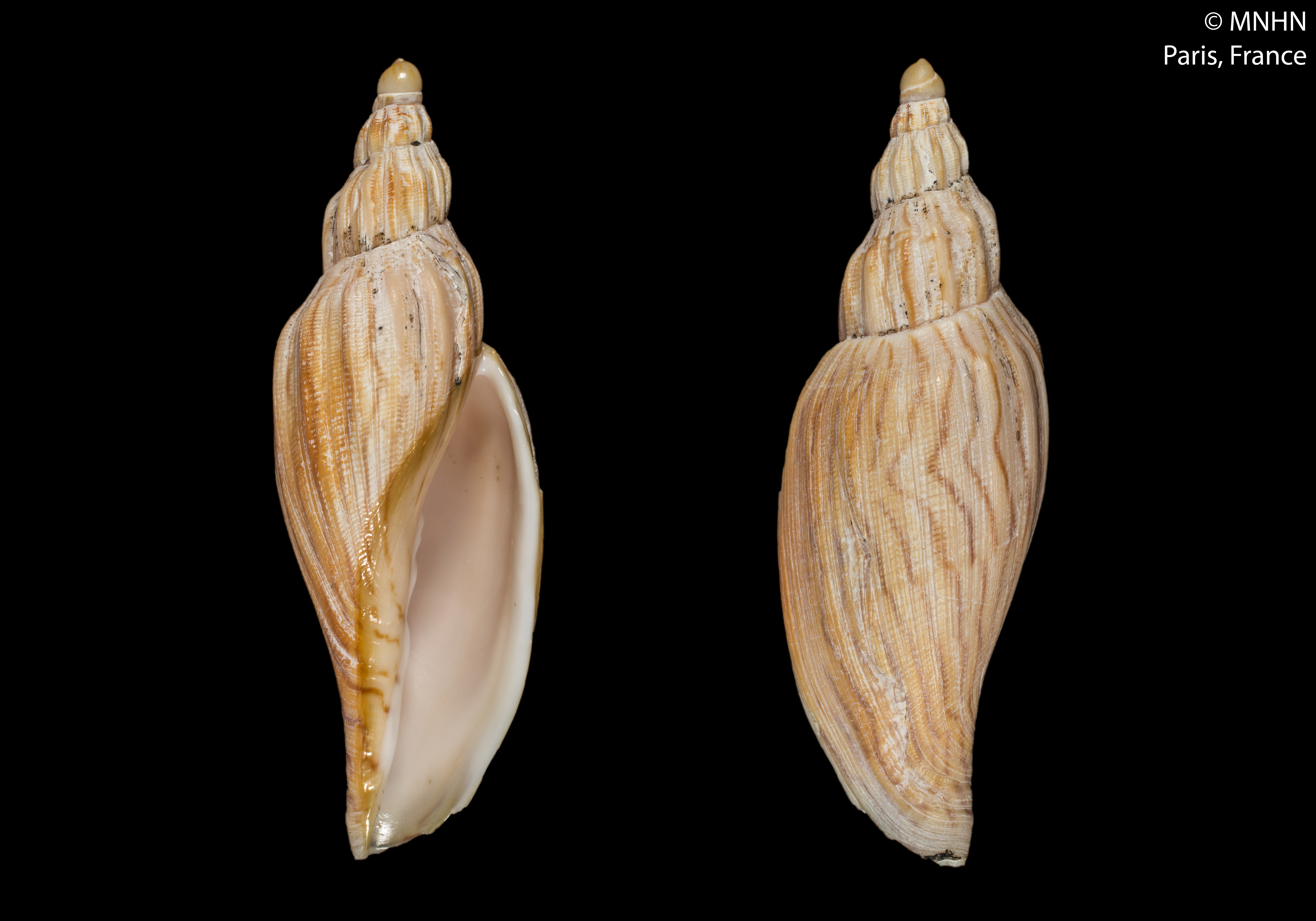
- Shell of Fulgoraria kaoae (holotype at MNHN, Paris)

Scientific classification
- Kingdom: Animalia
- Phylum: Mollusca
- Class: Gastropoda
- Subclass: Caenogastropoda
- Order: Neogastropoda
- Family: Volutidae
- Genus: Fulgoraria
- Subgenus: Fulgoraria (Fulgoraria)
- Species: F. kaoae

Binomial name
- Fulgoraria kaoae Bail, 2008

Synonyms
- Fulgoraria (Fulgoraria) kaoae Bail, 2008· accepted, alternate representation

= Fulgoraria kaoae =

Species of gastropod

Fulgoraria kaoae is a species of sea snail, a marine gastropod mollusk in the family Volutidae, the volutes.

== Description ==
The length of the shell attains 72.8 mm.

== Distribution ==
This marine species occurs off Taiwan.
