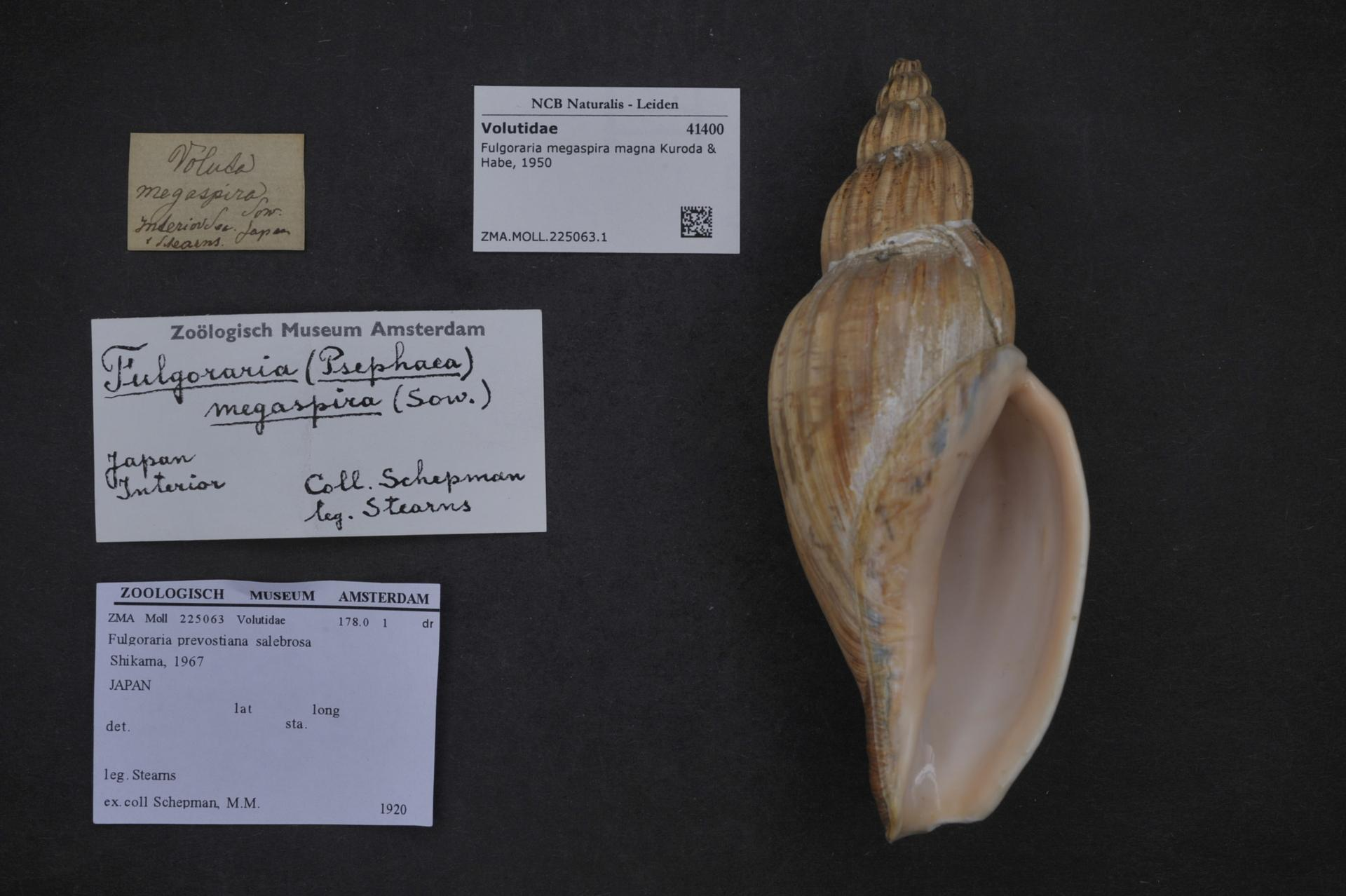
- Shell of Fulgoraria megaspira (specimen at Naturalis Biodiversity Center)

Scientific classification
- Kingdom: Animalia
- Phylum: Mollusca
- Class: Gastropoda
- Subclass: Caenogastropoda
- Order: Neogastropoda
- Family: Volutidae
- Genus: Fulgoraria
- Subgenus: Fulgoraria (Nipponomelon)
- Species: F. megaspira

Binomial name
- Fulgoraria megaspira (Sowerby I, 1844)

Synonyms
- Fulgoraria (Fulgoraria) exoptanda Shikama, 1967; Fulgoraria (Nipponomelon) megaspira (G. B. Sowerby I, 1844)· accepted, alternate representation; Fulgoraria (Nipponomelon) megaspira megaspira (G. B. Sowerby I, 1844)· accepted, alternate representation; Fulgoraria (Nipponomelon) megaspira megaspira f. exoptanda Shikama, 1967; Fulgoraria (Nipponomelon) megaspira megaspira var. angulosa Shikama, 1967; Fulgoraria amabilis Shikama & Watanabe, 1970; Fulgoraria angulosa (Shikama, 1967); Fulgoraria borealis Masuda,1990; Fulgoraria elongata Shikama, 1962; Fulgoraria exoptanda Shikama, 1967; Fulgoraria salebrosa Shikama, 1967; Musashia (Nipponomelon) angulosa Shikama, 1967; Voluta megaspira G. B. Sowerby I, 1844 (original combination)

= Fulgoraria megaspira =

Species of gastropod

Fulgoraria megaspira is a species of sea snail, a marine gastropod mollusk in the family Volutidae, the volutes.

Subspecies

- Fulgoraria megaspira magna Kuroda & Habe, 1950
- Fulgoraria megaspira prevostiana (Crosse, 1878)

== Description ==
The length of the shell attains 103 mm.

== Distribution ==
This marine species occurs off Japan.
