= Fulgoraria formosana =

Scientific classification
- Kingdom: Animalia
- Phylum: Mollusca
- Class: Gastropoda
- Subclass: Caenogastropoda
- Order: Neogastropoda
- Family: Volutidae
- Genus: Fulgoraria
- Subgenus: Fulgoraria (Musashia)
- Species: F. formosana

Binomial name
- Fulgoraria formosana Azuma, 1967

Species of gastropod

Fulgoraria formosana is a species of sea snail, a marine gastropod mollusk in the family Volutidae, the volutes.
