= Saotomea delicata =

Scientific classification
- Kingdom: Animalia
- Phylum: Mollusca
- Class: Gastropoda
- Subclass: Caenogastropoda
- Order: Neogastropoda
- Family: Volutidae
- Genus: Saotomea
- Species: S. delicata

Binomial name
- Saotomea delicata (Fulton, 1940)

Synonyms
- Fulgoraria (Saotomea) delicata (Fulton, 1940); Voluta (Fulgoraria) delicata Fulton, 1940 (basionym)

Species of gastropod

Saotomea delicata, the delicate volute, is a species of sea snail, a marine gastropod mollusc in the family Volutidae, the volutes.

== Description ==
The shell size varies between 25 mm and 55 mm.

== Distribution ==
This species is distributed in the seas along Japan.
