= Saotomea minima =

Scientific classification
- Kingdom: Animalia
- Phylum: Mollusca
- Class: Gastropoda
- Subclass: Caenogastropoda
- Order: Neogastropoda
- Family: Volutidae
- Genus: Saotomea
- Species: S. minima

Binomial name
- Saotomea minima (Bondarev, 1994)

Synonyms
- Fulgoraria (Saotomea) minima Bondarev, 1994; Fulgoraria minima Bondarev, 1994 (basionym)

Species of gastropod

Saotomea (Bondarevia) minima is a species of sea snail, a marine gastropod mollusk in the family Volutidae, the volutes.

== Description ==
The shell size varies between 20 mm and 35 mm.

== Distribution ==
This species is distributed in the South China Sea.
