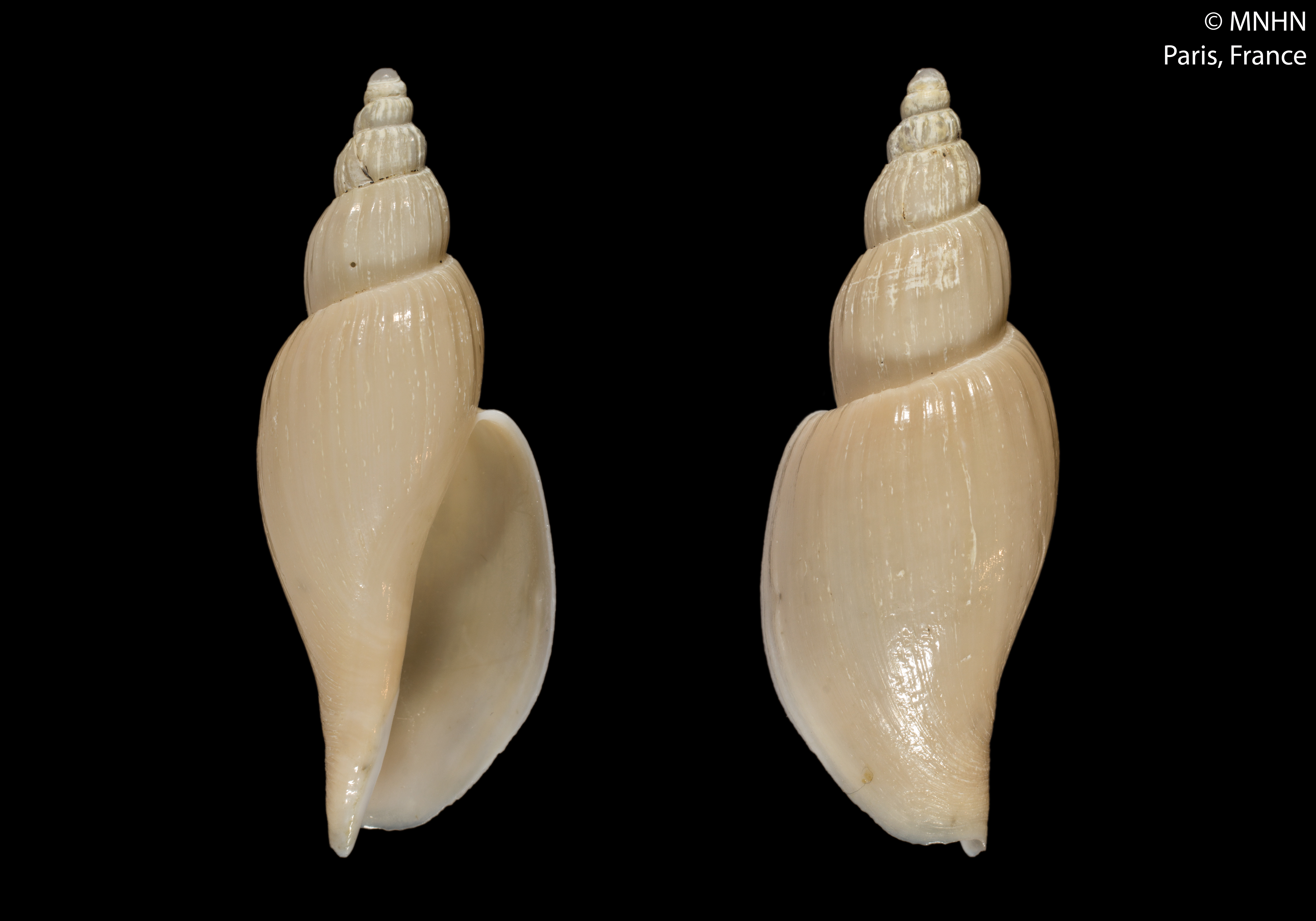

Scientific classification
- Kingdom: Animalia
- Phylum: Mollusca
- Class: Gastropoda
- Subclass: Caenogastropoda
- Order: Neogastropoda
- Family: Volutidae
- Genus: Saotomea
- Species: S. pratasensis

Binomial name
- Saotomea pratasensis Lan, 1997

Synonyms
- Fulgoraria (Saotomea) isabelae Bondarev & Bail, 1999; Fulgoraria (Saotomea) pratasensis Lan, 1997; Saotomea pratasensis Lan, 1997 (basionym)

= Saotomea pratasensis =

Species of gastropod

Saotomea pratasensis is a species of sea snail, a marine gastropod mollusc in the family Volutidae, the volutes.

== Description ==
=== External Shell and Structure ===
The height of S. pratasensis ranges from 45-60mm. Specimen photos show that S. pratasensis is solidly colored throughout the shell, with specimens ranging from cream white to sandy tan or tinged pale pink. The shape is fusiform-ovate with a large semicircular aperture. The shell has heavily impressed sutures between whorls. On the whorls are an axial sculpture of gently impressed lines. The spire is high and the body whorl composes approximately half of the entire height of the shell. The operculum is thin and relatively small in comparison to the large aperture. The presence of an operculum in this species is notable, as most Volutidae species lack an operculum.

=== Live Snail ===
In the absence of live snail samples, information can be inferred from species in the family Volutidae.

== Distribution and Habitat ==
This species is distributed in the East China Sea. Species in the family Volutidae are marine benthic snails.

== Life Habits ==
=== Diet ===
S. pratasensis is inferred to be a carnivorous predator or scavenger, based upon other species in Volutidae. Other species in Volutidae commonly consume bivalves, other gastropods, and carrion.

=== Reproduction ===
Volutidae species are gonochoric and reproduce sexually. They are non-broadcast spawners.

=== Locomotion ===
Species in Volutidae are noted to be active and relatively fast (in comparison to other marine gastropods). This family has a documented behavior of burying the majority of their body in sand or substrate. They move by mucus mediated gliding.
