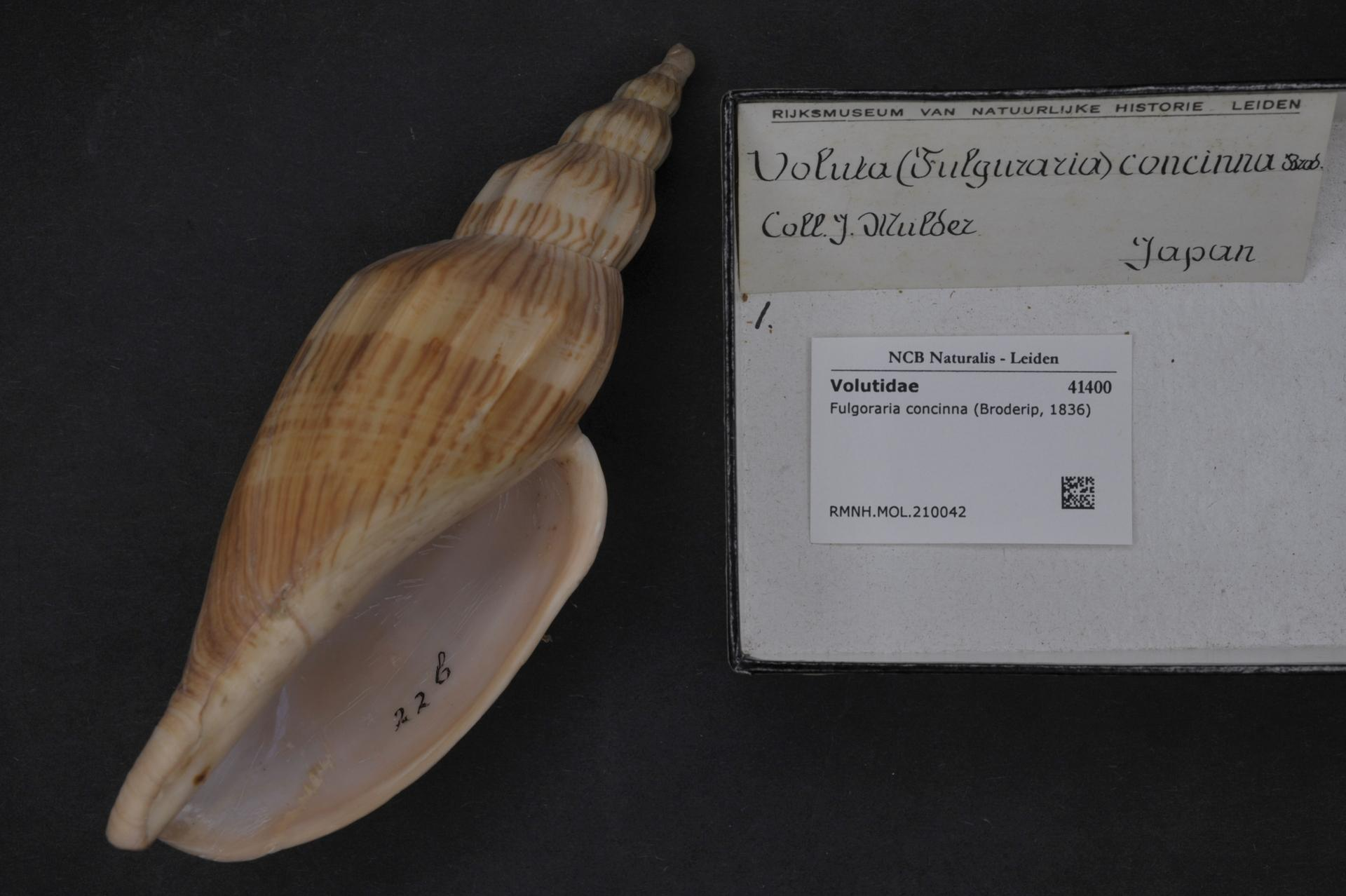

Scientific classification
- Kingdom: Animalia
- Phylum: Mollusca
- Class: Gastropoda
- Subclass: Caenogastropoda
- Order: Neogastropoda
- Family: Volutidae
- Genus: Fulgoraria
- Subgenus: Fulgoraria (Psephaea)
- Species: F. concinna

Binomial name
- Fulgoraria concinna (Broderip, 1836)

Synonyms
- Fulgoraria (Psephaea) concinna corrugata Shikama, 1967; Fulgoraria (Psephaea) concinna rosea Shikama, 1967

= Fulgoraria concinna =

Species of gastropod

Fulgoraria concinna is a species of sea snail, a marine gastropod mollusk in the family Volutidae, the volutes.
