= Saotomea solida =

Scientific classification
- Kingdom: Animalia
- Phylum: Mollusca
- Class: Gastropoda
- Subclass: Caenogastropoda
- Order: Neogastropoda
- Family: Volutidae
- Genus: Saotomea
- Species: S. solida

Binomial name
- Saotomea solida (Bail & Chino, 2000)

Synonyms
- Fulgoraria (Saotomea) solida Bail & Chino, 2000 (basionym)

Species of gastropod

Saotomea (Saotomea) solida is a species of sea snail, a marine gastropod mollusc in the family Volutidae, the volutes.

== Description ==
The shell size is 160 mm.

== Distribution ==
This species is distributed in the seas along Japan.
