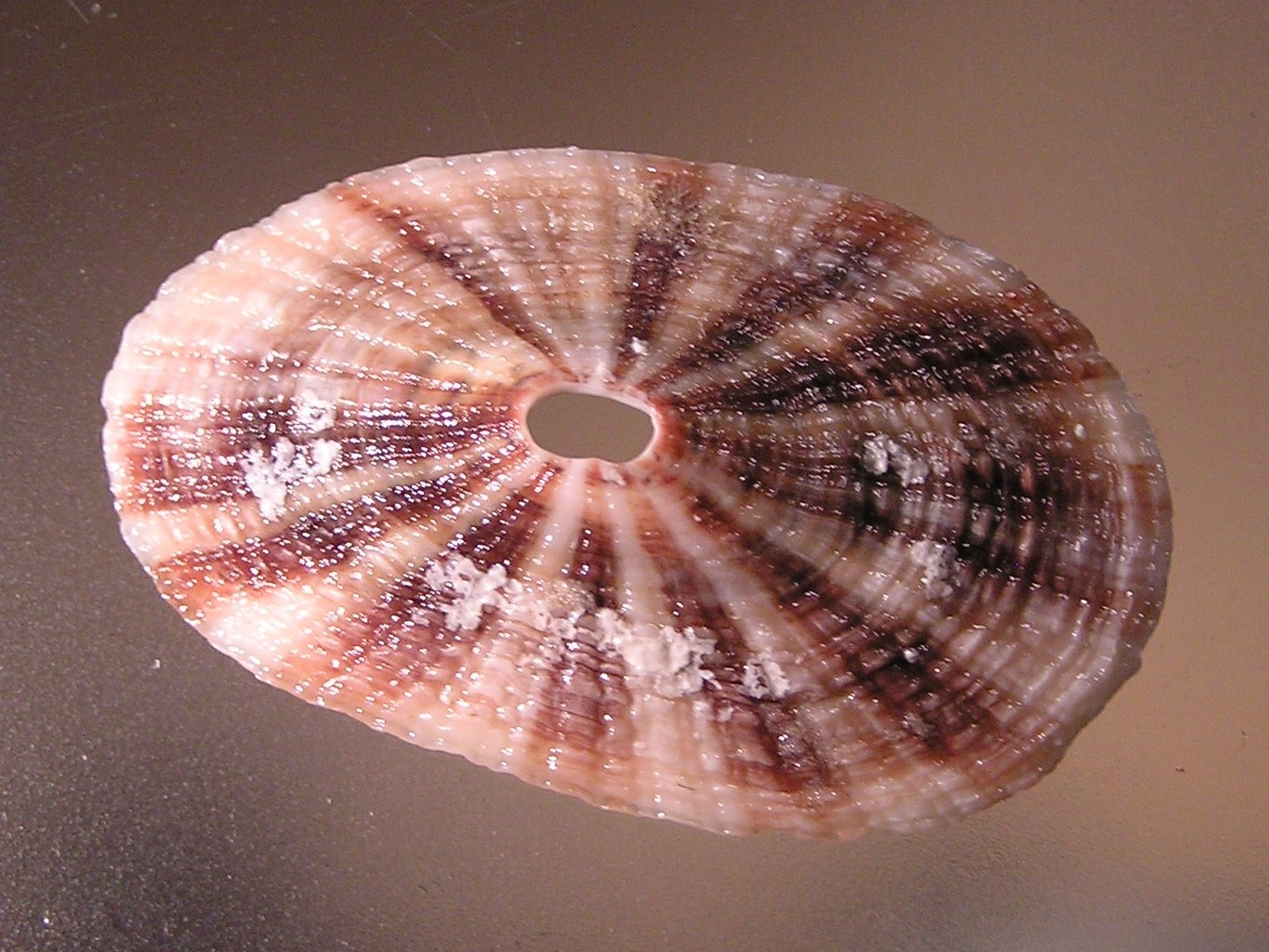
- Fissurella maxima

Scientific classification
- Kingdom: Animalia
- Phylum: Mollusca
- Class: Gastropoda
- Subclass: Vetigastropoda
- Order: Lepetellida
- Family: Fissurellidae
- Genus: Fissurella
- Species: F. maxima

Binomial name
- Fissurella maxima Sowerby I, 1834

Synonyms
- Fissurella concinna Philippi, 1845; Fissurella hondurasensis Reeve, 1849; Fissurella solida Philippi, 1845

= Fissurella maxima =

Species of South American gastropod

Fissurella maxima, common name the giant keyhole limpet, is a species of sea snail. It is a marine gastropod mollusk in the family Fissurellidae, the keyhole limpets.

== Description ==
The size of an adult shell can be as small as 50 millimeters, but is usually above 65 mm. The largest specimens are about 138 millimeters. No size-based sexual dimorphism has been found.

== Habitat & Distribution ==
F. maxima occurs in the Pacific Ocean between Ecuador and Tierra del Fuego. It is most commonly recorded in areas with a sea surface temperature of 10–15 °C (50–59 °F). It lives in the intertidal zone, usually on algae or the undersides of flat rocks.

== Reproduction ==
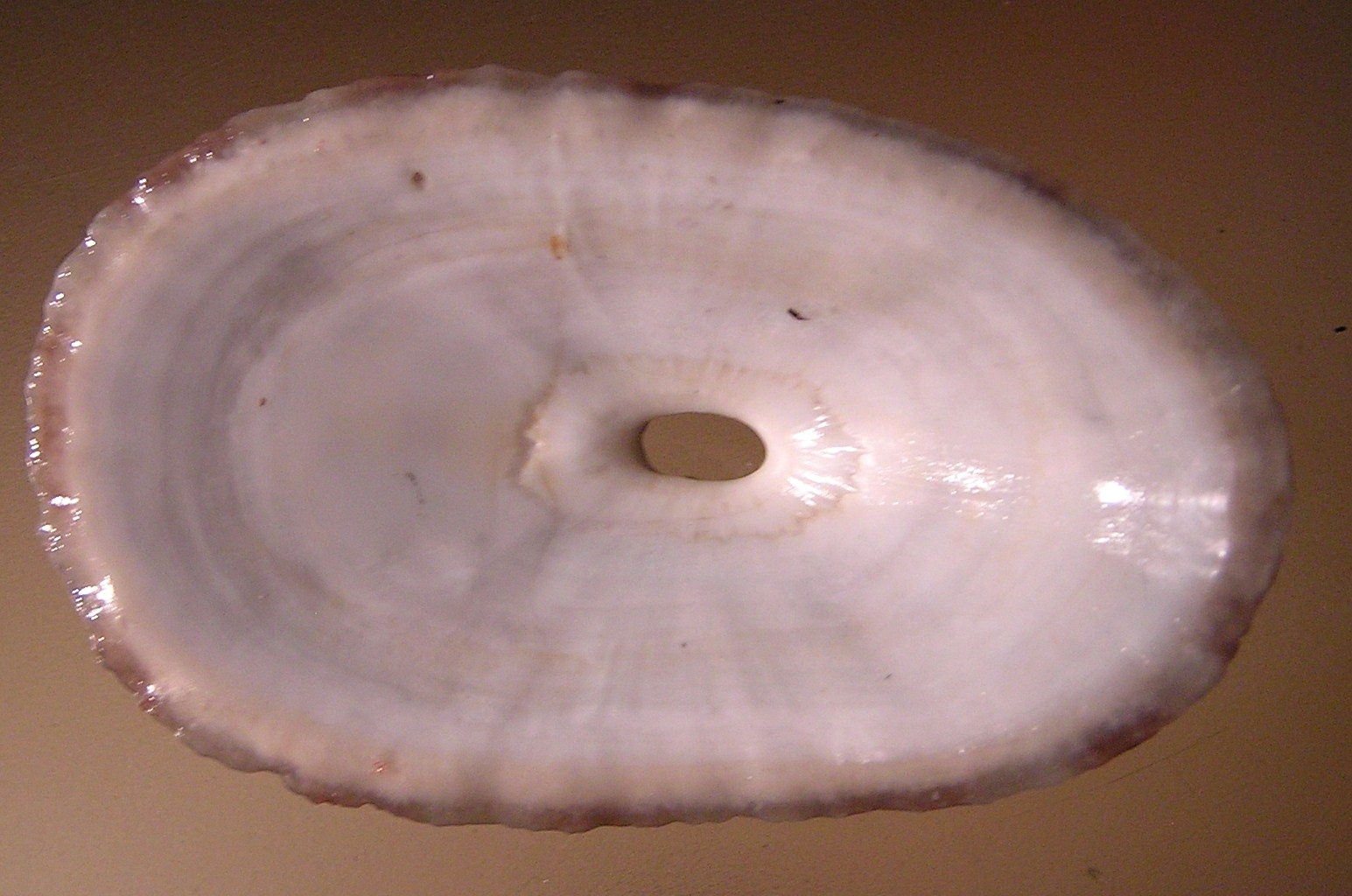
The underside of an F. maxima

F. maxima is dioecious, with separate male and female sexes. They primarily spawn during late November to December (late spring-early summer), but also have a secondary peak during July and August (winter).
