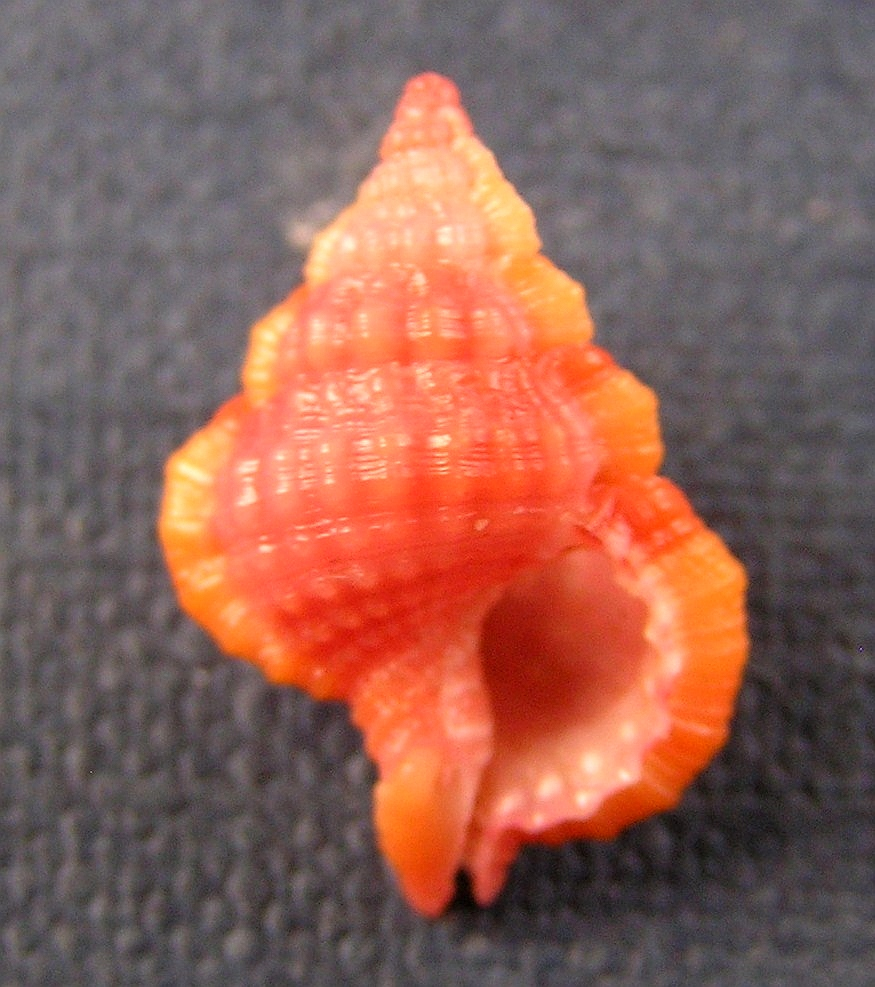
- shell of Gyrineum roseum

Scientific classification
- Kingdom: Animalia
- Phylum: Mollusca
- Class: Gastropoda
- Subclass: Caenogastropoda
- Order: Littorinimorpha
- Superfamily: Tonnoidea
- Family: Cymatiidae
- Genus: Gyrineum; Link, 1807

Type species
- Gyrineum gyrinum Link, 1807

Synonyms
- Apollon Montfort, 1810; Apollon (Biplex) Perry, 1810 ·; Argobuccinum (Gyrineum) Link, 1807; Biplex Perry, 1810; Bursa (Apollon) Montfort, 1810; Bursa (Biplex) Perry, 1810; Gyrinella Dall, 1924; Gyrineum (Biplex) Perry, 1810; Ranella (Biplex) Perry, 1810; Sassia (Gyrineum) Link, 1807

= Gyrineum =

Genus of gastropods

Gyrineum is a genus of predatory sea snails, marine gastropod mollusks in the family Cymatiidae.

== Description ==
The spire is elevated. The front siphonal canal is short. The posterior canal is wanting.

== Species ==
Species within the genus Gyrineum include:

- Gyrineum aculeatum (Schepman, 1909)
- Gyrineum bituberculare (Lamarck, 1816)
- Gyrineum bozzettii (Beu, 1998)
- Gyrineum concinnum (Dunker, 1862)
- Gyrineum cuspidatum (Reeve, 1844)
- Gyrineum gyrinum (Linnaeus, 1758)
- † Gyrineum harrisi (Cossmann, 1903)
- Gyrineum hirasei (Kuroda & Habe in Habe, 1961)
- Gyrineum lacunatum (Mighels, 1845)
- Gyrineum longicaudatum Beu, 1998
- † Gyrineum maccoyi (Pritchard, 1898)
- † Gyrineum magnificum (K. Martin, 1879)
- Gyrineum natator (Röding, 1798)
- † Gyrineum pamotanensis (K. Martin, 1899)
- Gyrineum perca (Perry, 1811)
- † Gyrineum perliberale (Beets, 1984)
- Gyrineum pulchellum (G.B. Sowerby I, 1825)
- Gyrineum pusillum (Broderip, 1833)
- Gyrineum roseum (Reeve, 1844)
- Gyrineum wilmerianum Preston, 1908

Species brought into synonymy

- Gyrineum atlanticum Fechter, 1975: synonym of Halgyrineum louisae (Lewis, 1974)
- Gyrineum bufonium Link, 1807: synonym of Bursa bufonia (Gmelin, 1791)
- Gyrineum cuspidataeformis Kira, 1956: synonym of Gyrineum lacunatum (Mighels, 1845)
- Gyrineum echinatum Link, 1807: synonym of Bufonaria echinata (Link, 1807)
- † Gyrineum elsmerense English, 1914: synonym of † Reticutriton elsmerensis (English, 1914) (original combination)
- Gyrineum louisae Lewis, 1974: synonym of Halgyrineum louisae (Lewis, 1974)
- Gyrineum nanshaensis Zhang, 2004: synonym of Gyrineum lacunatum (Mighels, 1845)
- Gyrineum pacator Iredale, 1931: synonym of Bufonaria margaritula (Deshayes, 1832)
- Gyrineum pusilla (Brodrip, 1833): synonym of Gyrineum pusillum (Broderip, 1833)
- Gyrineum pusillum auct.: synonym of Gyrineum lacunatum (Mighels, 1845)
- Gyrineum pusillus [sic]: synonym of Gyrineum pusillum (Broderip, 1833) (misspelling)
- Gyrineum verrucosum Link, 1807: synonym of Gyrineum gyrinum (Linnaeus, 1758)
- Gyrineum wilmeriana Preston, 1908: synonym of Gyrineum wilmerianum Preston, 1908 (wrong gender agreement of specific epithet)
