= B. pulchella =

B. pulchella may refer to:

- Banksia pulchella, the teasel banksia, a shrub species found in Western Australia
- Biplex pulchella, a sea snail species
