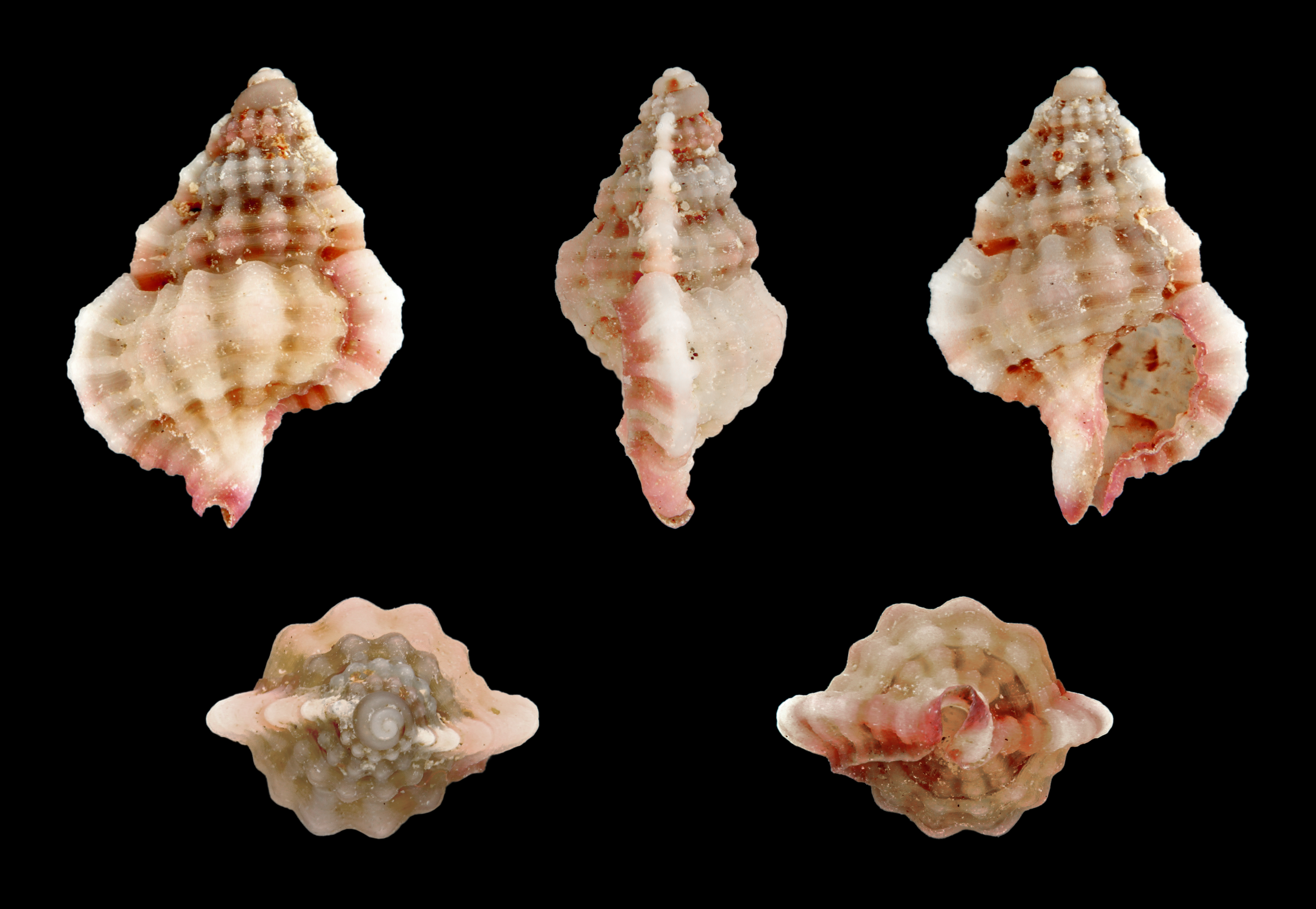

Scientific classification
- Kingdom: Animalia
- Phylum: Mollusca
- Class: Gastropoda
- Subclass: Caenogastropoda
- Order: Littorinimorpha
- Family: Cymatiidae
- Genus: Gyrineum
- Species: G. pusillum

Binomial name
- Gyrineum pusillum (Broderip, 1833)

Synonyms
- Apollon pusillus (Broderip, 1833); Gyrineum pusilla (Brodrip, 1833) (Spelling variation); Gyrineum pusillus Broderip (Spelling variation); Ranella pusilla Broderip, 1833 (basionym)

= Gyrineum pusillum =

Species of gastropod

Gyrineum pusillum, the purple gyron triton, is a species of predatory sea snail, a marine gastropod mollusk in the family Cymatiidae.

== Description ==
The length of the shell varies between 7 mm and 25 mm. The shell is characterized by its distinctive purple coloration, which gives the species its common name. Like other members of the genus Gyrineum, this species has a relatively small, robust shell with characteristic varices (thickened ridges) and sculptural features typical of the Cymatiidae family.

== Habitat and ecology ==
Gyrineum pusillum is a benthic species that inhabits shallow marine sediments and is carnivorous in its feeding habits. As a predatory gastropod, it feeds on other small invertebrates found in its marine environment.

=== Life cycle ===
Members of the order Neotaenioglossa are mostly gonochoric and broadcast spawners, with embryos developing into planktonic trocophore larvae and later into juvenile veligers before becoming fully grown adults. This planktonic larval stage allows for wide dispersal of the species across suitable habitats.

== Distribution ==
This species occurs in the Red Sea and in the Indian Ocean off Tanzania and Aldabra. The species has also been recorded from the Western Central Pacific Ocean, including Guam and Indonesia, as well as from Queensland, Australia. Additional specimens have been collected from Okinawa in Japan and KwaZulu-Natal in South Africa.

== Taxonomy ==
The species was originally described by William Broderip in 1833 as Ranella pusilla. It has since been reclassified within the genus Gyrineum. The family placement has varied in taxonomic literature, with the species being classified in either Cymatiidae or Ranellidae (an alternative family name sometimes used for this group). The type locality is the western coast of South America and islands of the southern Pacific Ocean, based on specimens collected by Hugh Cuming.

== Bibliography ==
- Spry, J.F. (1961). "The sea shells of Dar es Salaam: Gastropods". Tanganyika Notes and Records. 56.
- Taylor, J.D. (1973). Provisional list of the mollusca of Aldabra Atoll (Report).
- Vine, P. (1986). Red Sea Invertebrates. London: Immel Publishing. p. 224.
- Beu, A. (2010). Catalogue of Tonnoidea.
- Broderip, W.J.; Sowerby, G.B. I (1832–1833). "Descriptions of new species of shells from the collection formed by Mr. Cuming on the western coast of South America, and among the islands of the southern Pacific Ocean". Proceedings of the Committee of Science and Correspondence of the Zoological Society of London. Part II for 1832: 25–33, 50–61, 104–108, 113–120, 173–179, 194–202.
