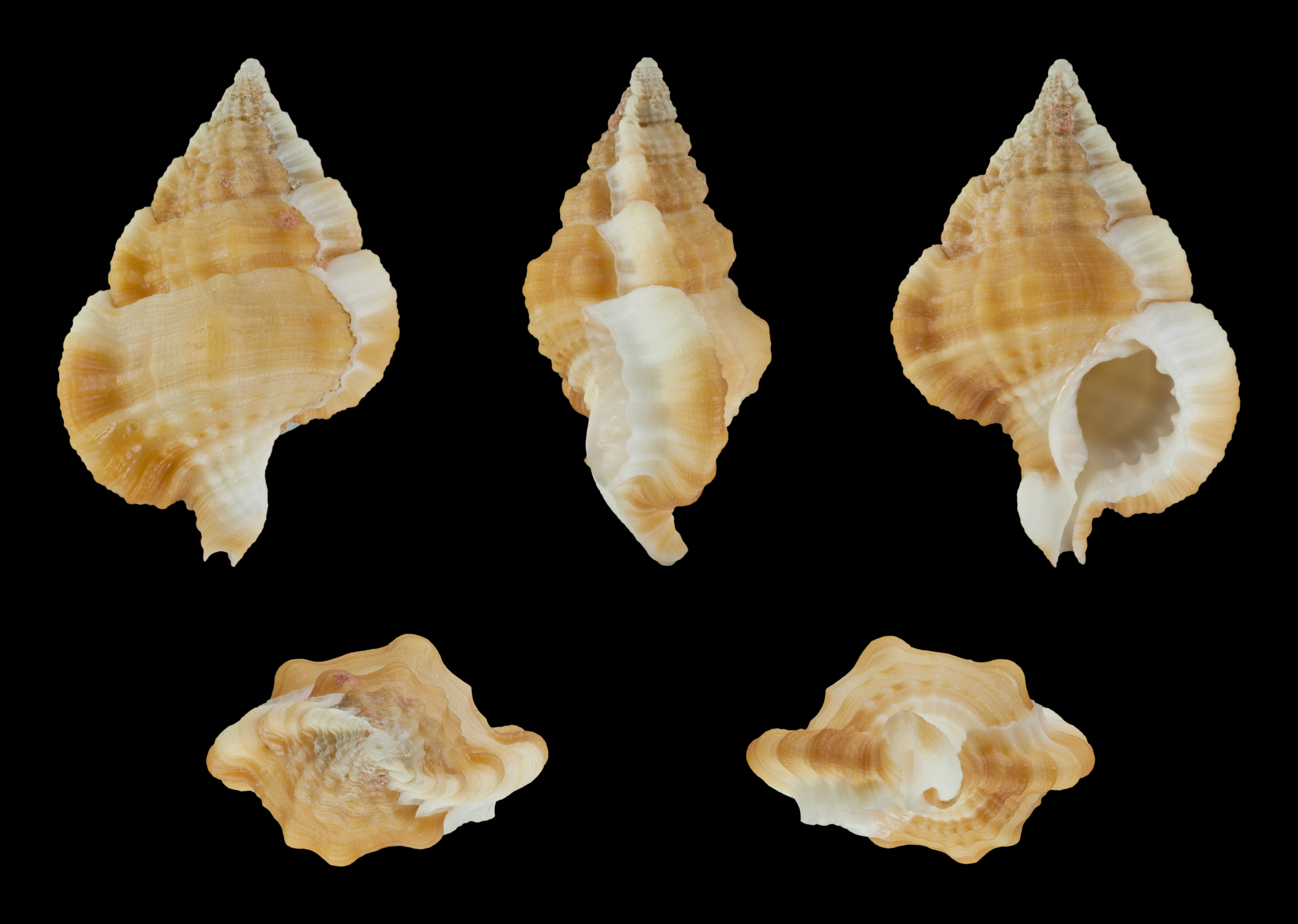

Scientific classification
- Kingdom: Animalia
- Phylum: Mollusca
- Class: Gastropoda
- Subclass: Caenogastropoda
- Order: Littorinimorpha
- Family: Cymatiidae
- Genus: Gyrineum
- Species: G. cuspidatum

Binomial name
- Gyrineum cuspidatum (Reeve, 1844)

Synonyms
- Ranella cuspidata Reeve, 1844

= Gyrineum cuspidatum =

Species of gastropod

Gyrineum cuspidatum is a species of predatory sea snail, a marine gastropod mollusc in the family Cymatiidae.
