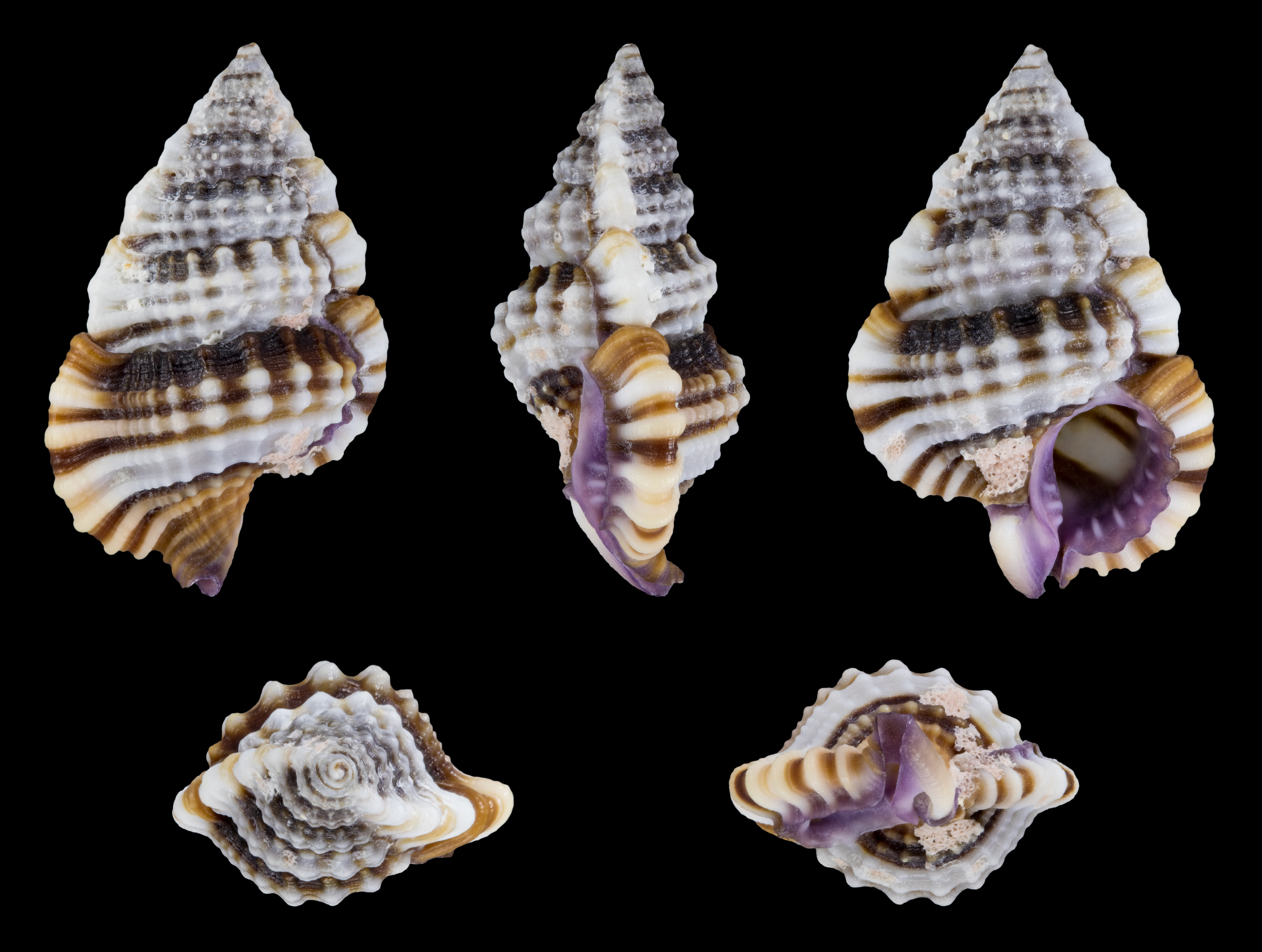
- Shell of Gyrineum lacunatum
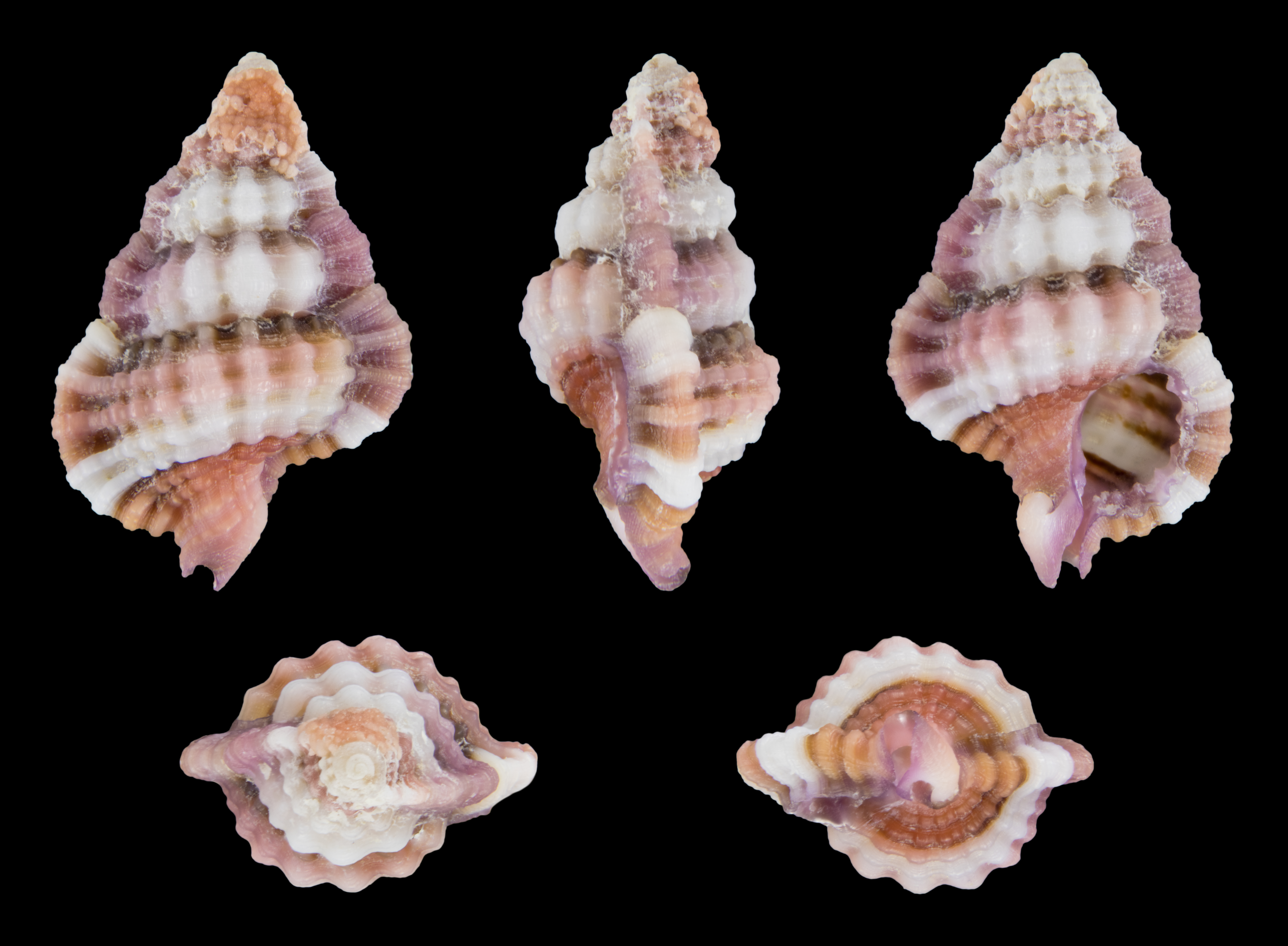

Scientific classification
- Kingdom: Animalia
- Phylum: Mollusca
- Class: Gastropoda
- Subclass: Caenogastropoda
- Order: Littorinimorpha
- Family: Cymatiidae
- Genus: Gyrineum
- Species: G. lacunatum

Binomial name
- Gyrineum lacunatum (Mighels, 1845)

Synonyms
- Apollon deliberatus Iredale, 1936; Apollon facetus Iredale, 1936; Apollon pusillus cuspidataeformis Kira, 1956; Gyrineum nanshaensis Zhang, 2004; Gyrineum pusillum auctt Ranella chemnitzii Küster in Küster & Kobelt, 1871; Ranella polychloros Tapparone-Canefri, 1875; Ranella saggita Küster in Küster & Kobelt, 1871; Triton lacunatum Mighels, 1845

= Gyrineum lacunatum =

Species of gastropod

Gyrineum lacunatum is a species of predatory sea snail, a marine gastropod mollusc in the family Cymatiidae.

== Distribution ==
This species occurs in the Indian Ocean off Madagascar; also off New Caledonia.
