= Gyrineum wilmerianum =

Scientific classification
- Kingdom: Animalia
- Phylum: Mollusca
- Class: Gastropoda
- Subclass: Caenogastropoda
- Order: Littorinimorpha
- Family: Cymatiidae
- Genus: Gyrineum
- Species: G. wilmerianum

Binomial name
- Gyrineum wilmerianum Preston, 1908

Species of gastropod

Gyrineum wilmerianum is a species of predatory sea snail, a marine gastropod mollusk in the family Cymatiidae.
