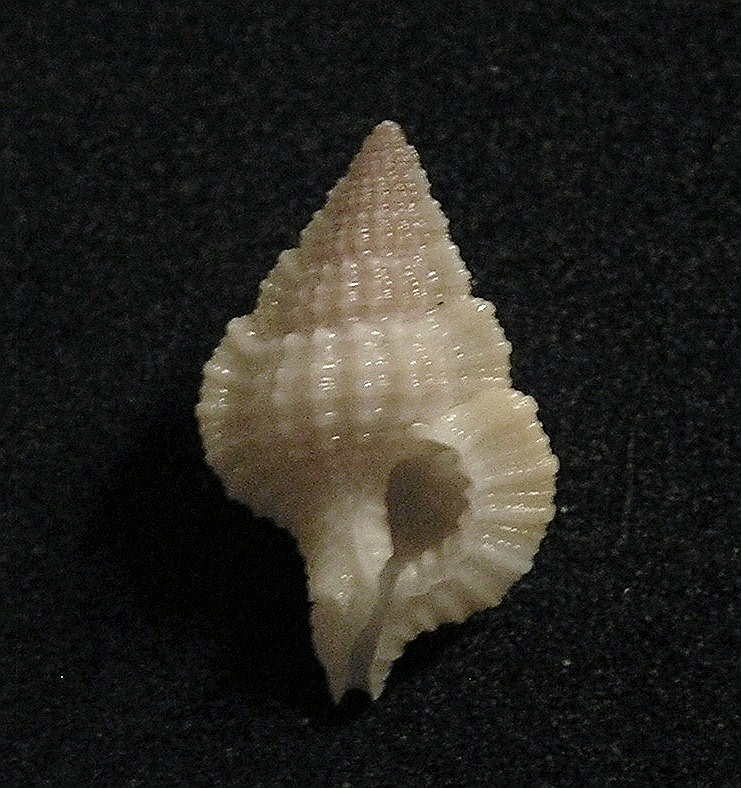
- Apertural view of a shell of Gyrineum hirasei

Scientific classification
- Kingdom: Animalia
- Phylum: Mollusca
- Class: Gastropoda
- Subclass: Caenogastropoda
- Order: Littorinimorpha
- Family: Cymatiidae
- Genus: Gyrineum
- Species: G. hirasei

Binomial name
- Gyrineum hirasei (Kuroda & Habe in Habe, 1961)

Synonyms
- Biplex hirasei Kuroda & Habe in Habe, 1961

= Gyrineum hirasei =

Species of gastropod

Gyrineum hirasei is a species of predatory sea snail, a marine gastropod mollusk in the family Cymatiidae.

== Description ==
The length of the shell varies between 14 mm and 38 mm.

== Distribution ==
This species occurs in the Indo-Pacific from South Africa to Japan.
