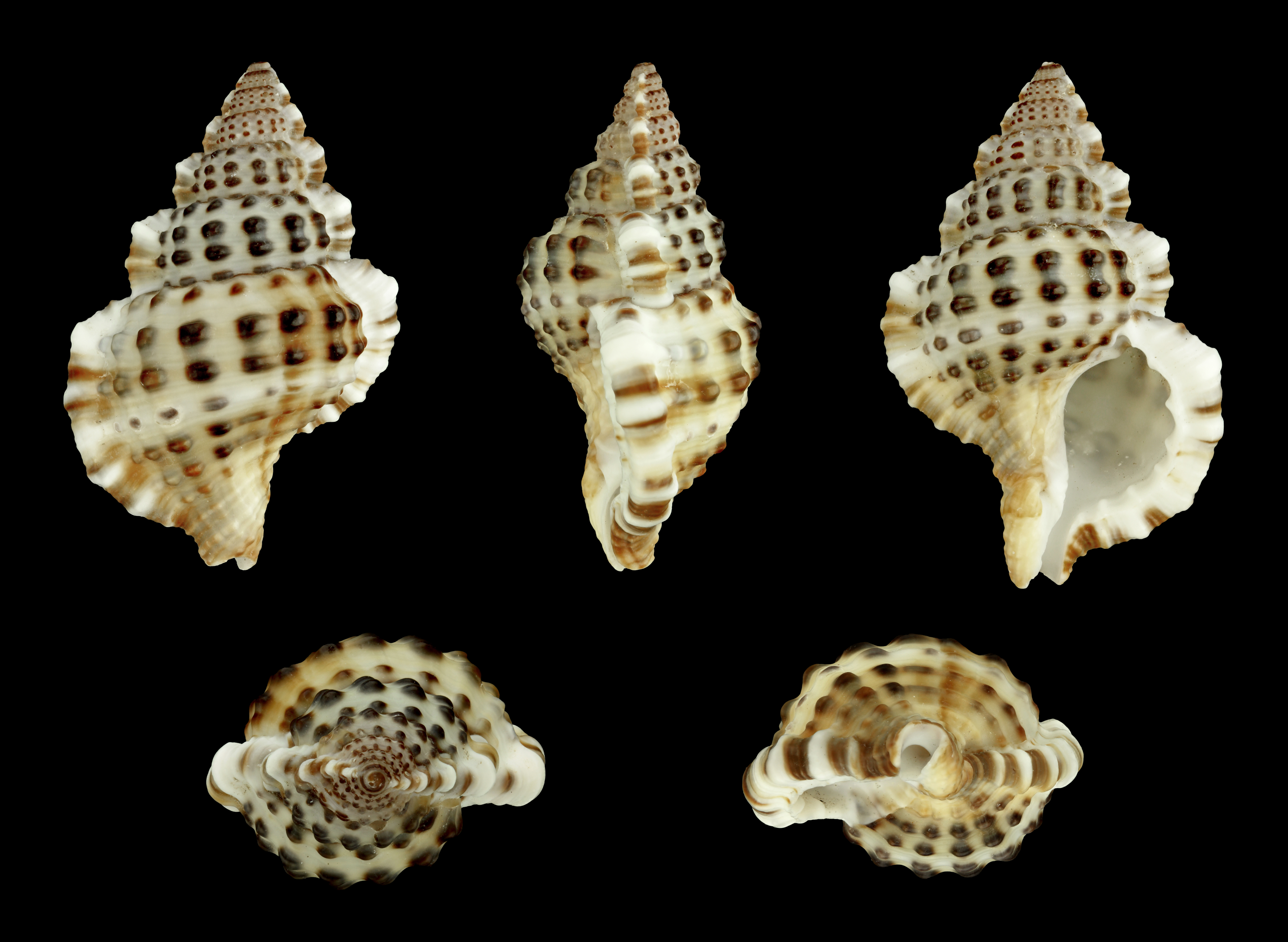

Scientific classification
- Kingdom: Animalia
- Phylum: Mollusca
- Class: Gastropoda
- Subclass: Caenogastropoda
- Order: Littorinimorpha
- Family: Cymatiidae
- Genus: Gyrineum
- Species: G. natator

Binomial name
- Gyrineum natator (Röding, 1798)

Synonyms
- Biplex elegans Perry, 1811; Gyrineum natator var. robusta Fulton, 1936; Ranella olivator “Meuschen” Mörch, 1853; Ranella tuberculata Broderip, 1833; Tritonium natator Röding, 1798

= Gyrineum natator =

Species of gastropod

Gyrineum natator is a species of predatory sea snail, a marine gastropod mollusk in the family Cymatiidae.
