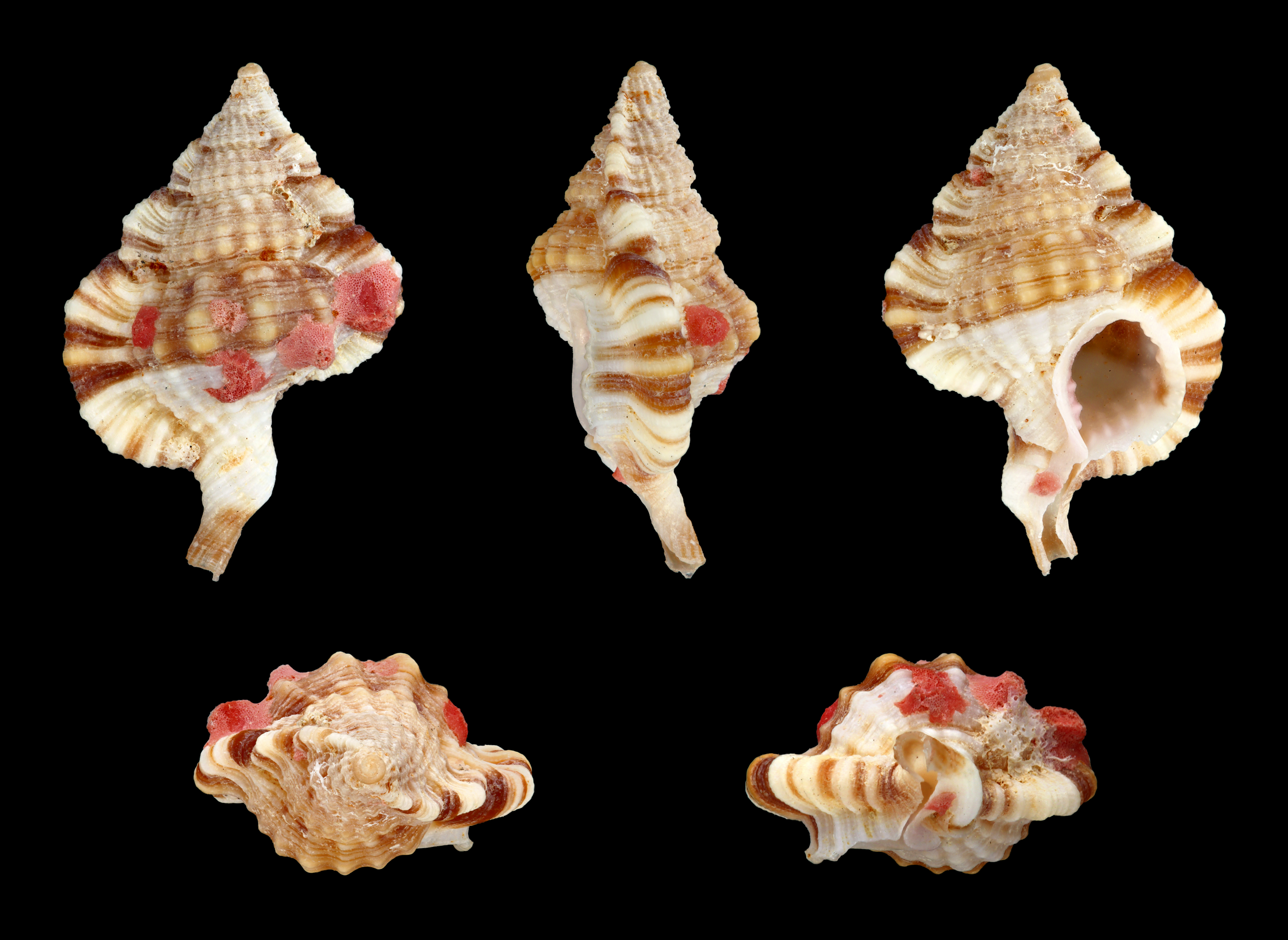

Scientific classification
- Kingdom: Animalia
- Phylum: Mollusca
- Class: Gastropoda
- Subclass: Caenogastropoda
- Order: Littorinimorpha
- Family: Cymatiidae
- Genus: Gyrineum
- Species: G. longicaudatum

Binomial name
- Gyrineum longicaudatum Beu, 1998

= Gyrineum longicaudatum =

Species of gastropod

Gyrineum longicaudatum is a species of predatory sea snail, a marine gastropod mollusk in the family Cymatiidae.

== Distribution ==
This species occurs in the Coral Sea and off New Caledonia in the Pacific.
