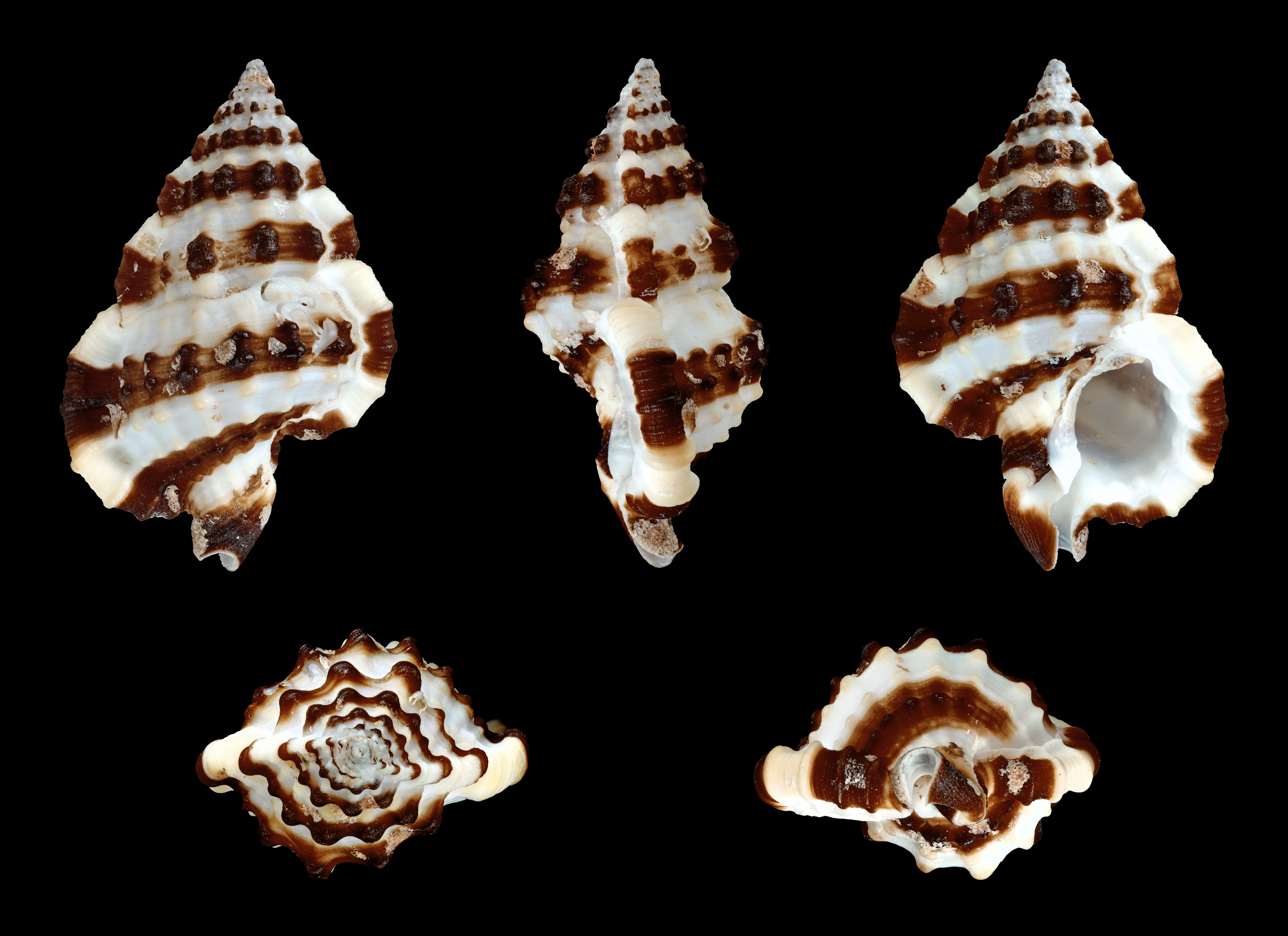
- Five views of a shell of Gyrineum gyrinum

Scientific classification
- Kingdom: Animalia
- Phylum: Mollusca
- Class: Gastropoda
- Subclass: Caenogastropoda
- Order: Littorinimorpha
- Family: Cymatiidae
- Genus: Gyrineum
- Species: G. gyrinum

Binomial name
- Gyrineum gyrinum (Linnaeus, 1758)

Synonyms
- Biplex variegata Perry, 1811; Gyrineum verrucosum Link, 1807; Murex gyrinum Linnaeus, 1758; Ranella ranina Lamarck, 1816

= Gyrineum gyrinum =

Species of gastropod

Gyrineum gyrinum, also known as the tadpole triton, is a species of predatory sea snail, a marine gastropod mollusk in the family Cymatiidae.

== Description ==
This species attains a size around 35 mm.

== Distribution ==
This marine species occurs off Papua New Guinea and off Queensland, Australia.
