= Gyrineum concinnum =

Scientific classification
- Kingdom: Animalia
- Phylum: Mollusca
- Class: Gastropoda
- Subclass: Caenogastropoda
- Order: Littorinimorpha
- Family: Cymatiidae
- Genus: Gyrineum
- Species: G. concinnum

Binomial name
- Gyrineum concinnum (Dunker, 1862)

Synonyms
- Bursa concinna Dunker, 1862

Species of gastropod

Gyrineum concinnum is a species of predatory sea snail, a marine gastropod mollusk in the family Cymatiidae.
