= Halgyrineum =

Scientific classification
- Kingdom: Animalia
- Phylum: Mollusca
- Class: Gastropoda
- Subclass: Caenogastropoda
- Order: Littorinimorpha
- Family: Cymatiidae
- Genus: Halgyrineum; Beu, 1998

Genus of gastropods

Halgyrineum is a genus of predatory sea snails, marine gastropod mollusks in the family Cymatiidae.

== Species ==
Species within the genus Halgyrineum include:

- Halgyrineum louisae (Lewis, 1974)
