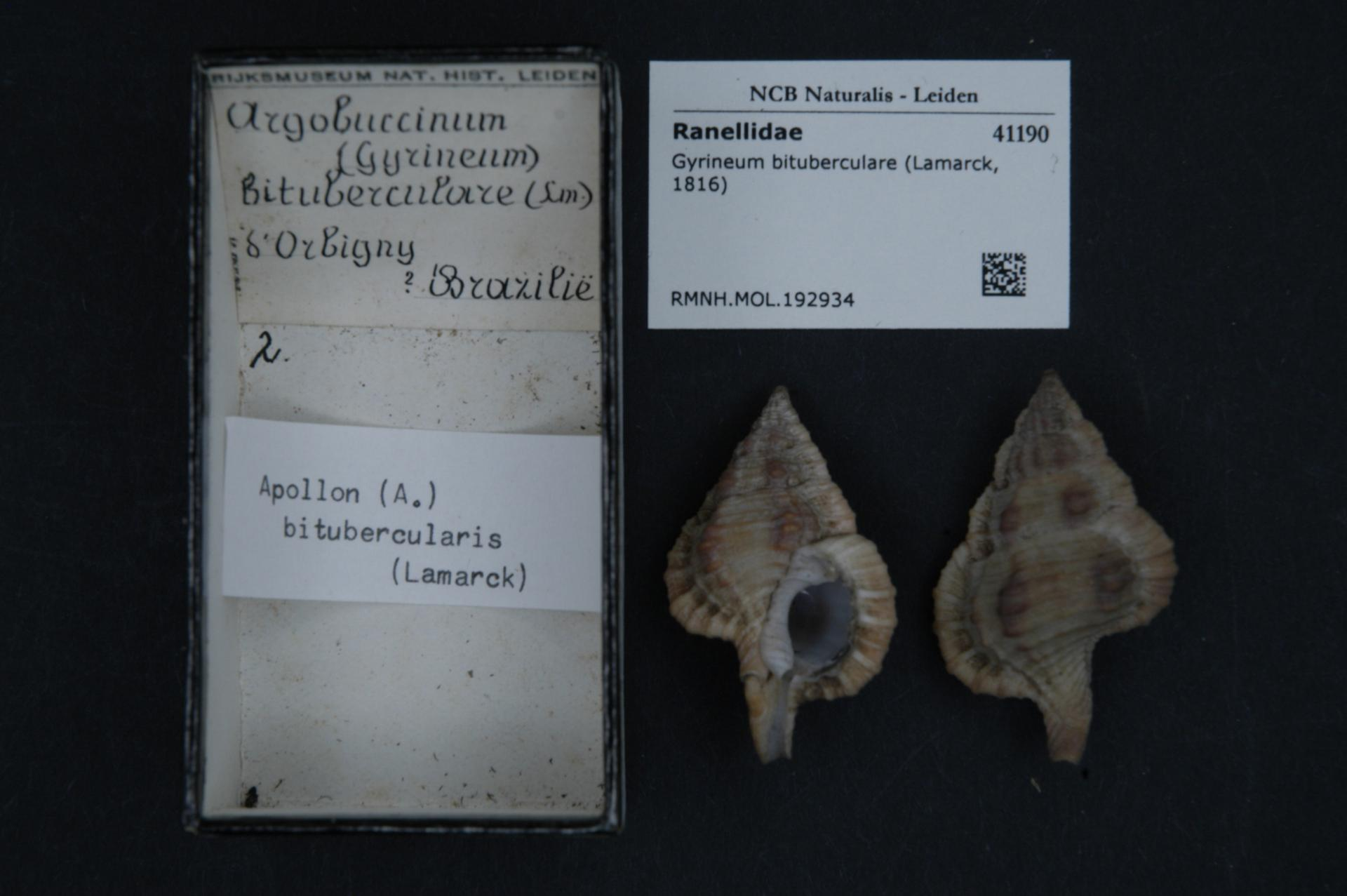

Scientific classification
- Kingdom: Animalia
- Phylum: Mollusca
- Class: Gastropoda
- Subclass: Caenogastropoda
- Order: Littorinimorpha
- Family: Cymatiidae
- Genus: Gyrineum
- Species: G. bituberculare

Binomial name
- Gyrineum bituberculare (Lamarck, 1816)

Synonyms
- Bursa fuscocostata Dunker, 1862; Ranella bituberculare Lamarck, 1816

= Gyrineum bituberculare =

Species of gastropod

Gyrineum bituberculare is a species of predatory sea snail, a marine gastropod mollusk in the family Cymatiidae.

== Description ==
The length of the shell varies between 27 mm and 50 mm.

== Distribution ==
This marine species occurs in the Indo-West Pacific.
