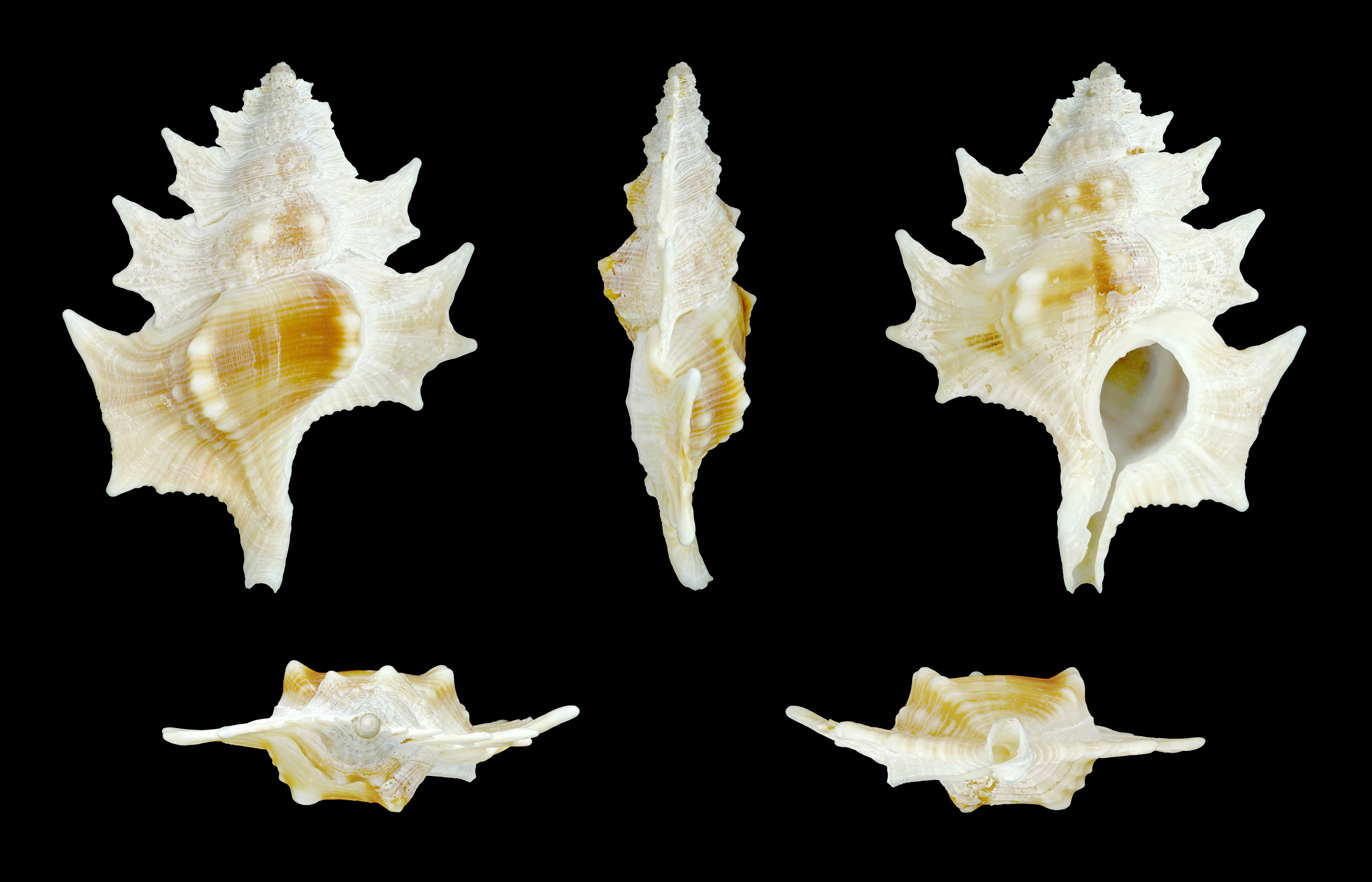
- Five views of a shell of Gyrineum perca

Scientific classification
- Kingdom: Animalia
- Phylum: Mollusca
- Class: Gastropoda
- Subclass: Caenogastropoda
- Order: Littorinimorpha
- Family: Cymatiidae
- Genus: Gyrineum
- Species: G. perca

Binomial name
- Gyrineum perca (Perry, 1811)

Synonyms
- Apollon perca (Perry, 1811); Gyrineum (Biplex) perca (Perry, 1811); Biplex perca Perry, 1811; Gyrineum perca edgerleyi Richards, 1933

= Gyrineum perca =

Species of gastropod

Gyrineum perca is a species of predatory sea snail, a marine gastropod mollusk in the family Cymatiidae. It is more commonly known as the winged triton or the maple leaf triton.

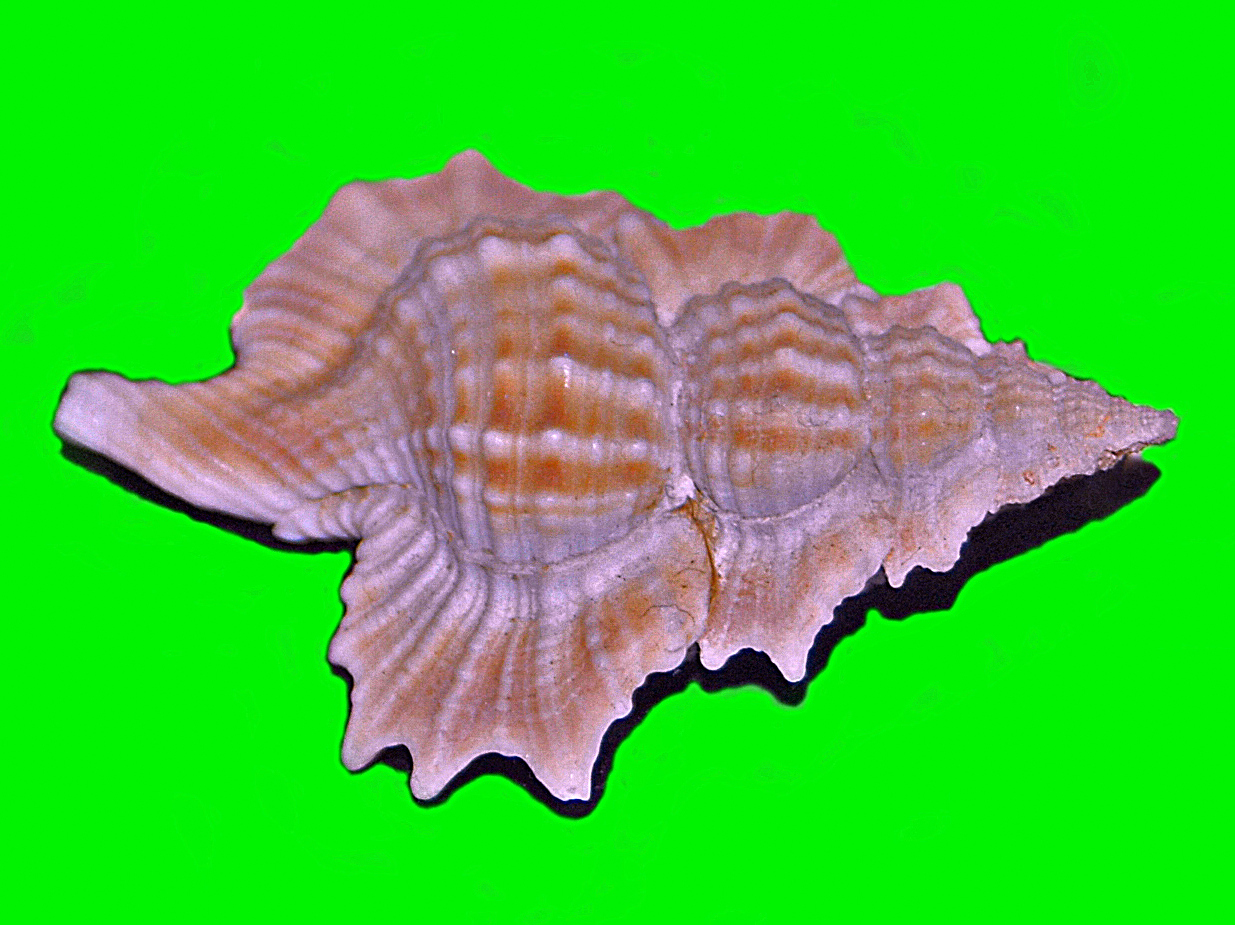
A shell of Gyrineum perca

== Description ==
Shells of Gyrineum perca can reach a length of 31–100 millimetres (1.2–3.9 in). These unusual shells are quite flattened, well adapted to laying on a soft substrate, with large flanges close to the outer lips and a blade-like outpouching of the outer shell layer, forming two longitudinal folds (hence the genus name). Shell surface may be whitish, yellowish or pale brown.

== Distribution ==
Indo-Pacific: widespread from Eastern Africa to Japan.

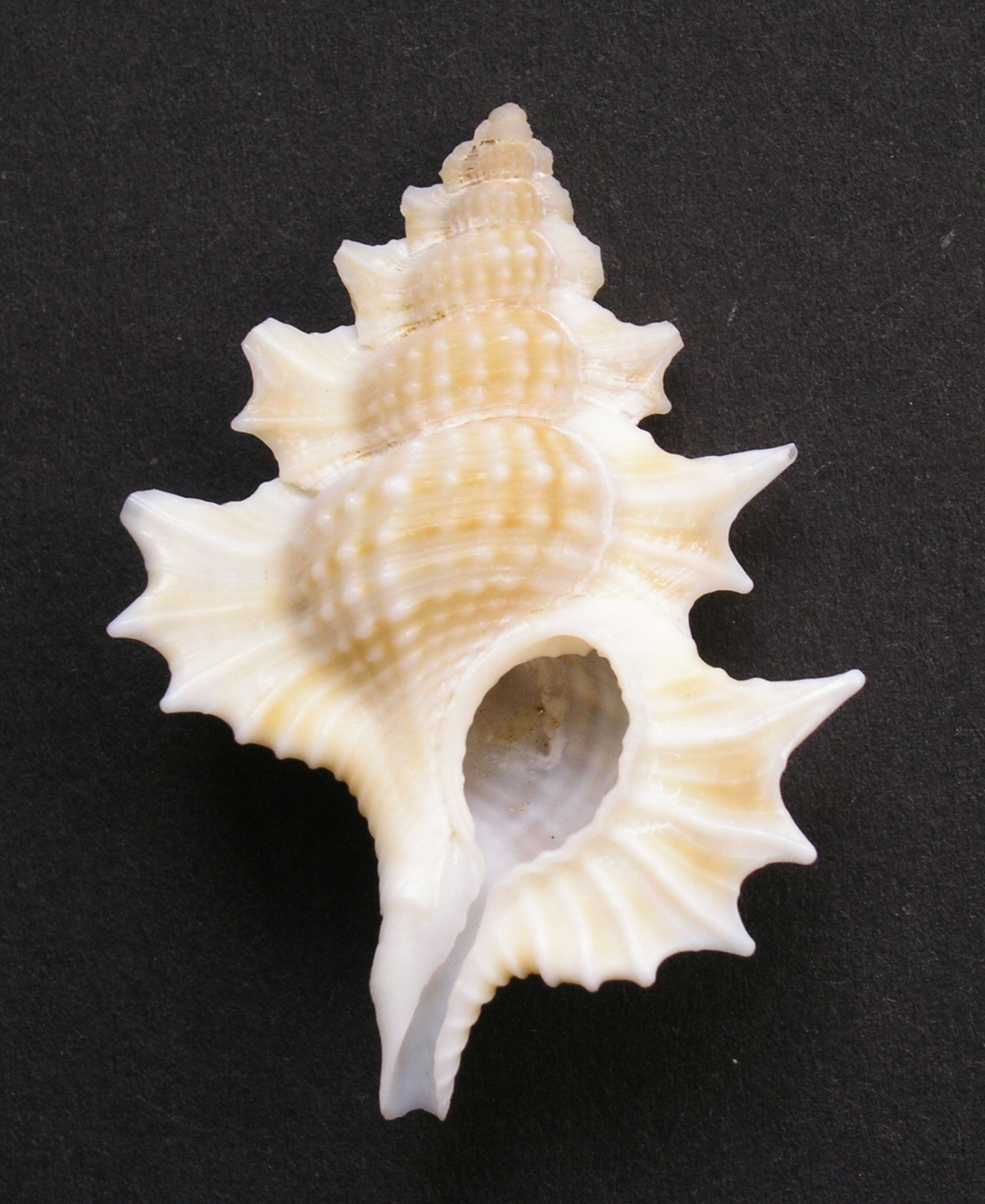
A shell of Gyrineum perca

== Bibliography ==
- Beu, A. (2010). Catalogue of Tonnoidea. Pers. comm.
- B. Wilson - Australian Marine Shells Part 1
- F Springsteen, F. M. Leobrera - Shells of the Philippines
- G. T. Poppe - Philippine Marine Molluscs Vol. 1
- Ngoc-Thach Nguyên - Shells of Vietnam
- Thomas Henning and Jens Hennens - Ranellidae and Personidae of the World
- Yoichiro Hirase - Shells of Japan
