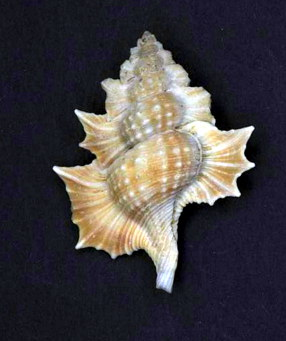
- Abapertural view of a shell of Gyrineum aculeatum

Scientific classification
- Kingdom: Animalia
- Phylum: Mollusca
- Class: Gastropoda
- Subclass: Caenogastropoda
- Order: Littorinimorpha
- Family: Cymatiidae
- Genus: Gyrineum
- Species: G. aculeatum

Binomial name
- Gyrineum aculeatum (Schepman, 1909)

Synonyms
- Biplex aculeata (Schepman, 1909); Biplex pulchra (G. B. Sowerby II, 1836); Bursa (Biplex) microstoma Fulton, 1930; Gyrineum (Biplex) perca var. aculeata Schepman, 1909; Ranella pulchra G.B. Sowerby II, 1836

= Gyrineum aculeatum =

Species of gastropod

Gyrineum aculeatum, the spined maple leaf, is a species of predatory sea snail, a marine gastropod mollusc in the family Cymatiidae.

== Description ==
The size of the shell varies between 25 mm and 60 mm.

== Distribution ==
This marine species occurs from Japan to Northwest Australia.
