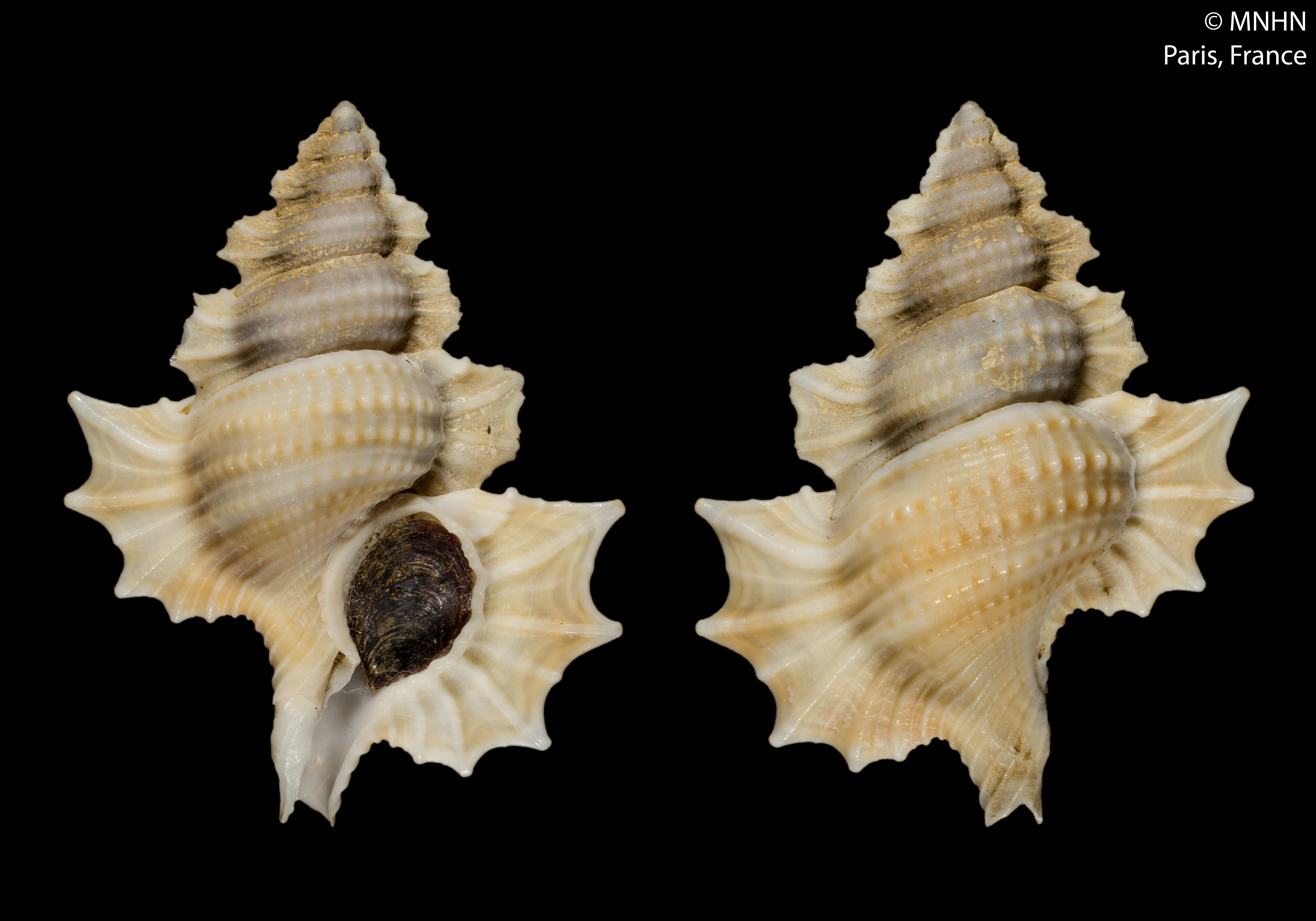
- Shell of Gyrineum bozzettii (holotype at MNHN, Paris)

Scientific classification
- Kingdom: Animalia
- Phylum: Mollusca
- Class: Gastropoda
- Subclass: Caenogastropoda
- Order: Littorinimorpha
- Superfamily: Tonnoidea
- Family: Cymatiidae
- Genus: Gyrineum
- Species: G. bozzettii

Binomial name
- Gyrineum bozzettii (Beu, 1998)

Synonyms
- Biplex bozzettii Beu, 1998

= Gyrineum bozzettii =

Species of gastropod

Gyrineum bozzettii is a species of predatory sea snail, a marine gastropod mollusk in the family Cymatiidae.

== Description ==
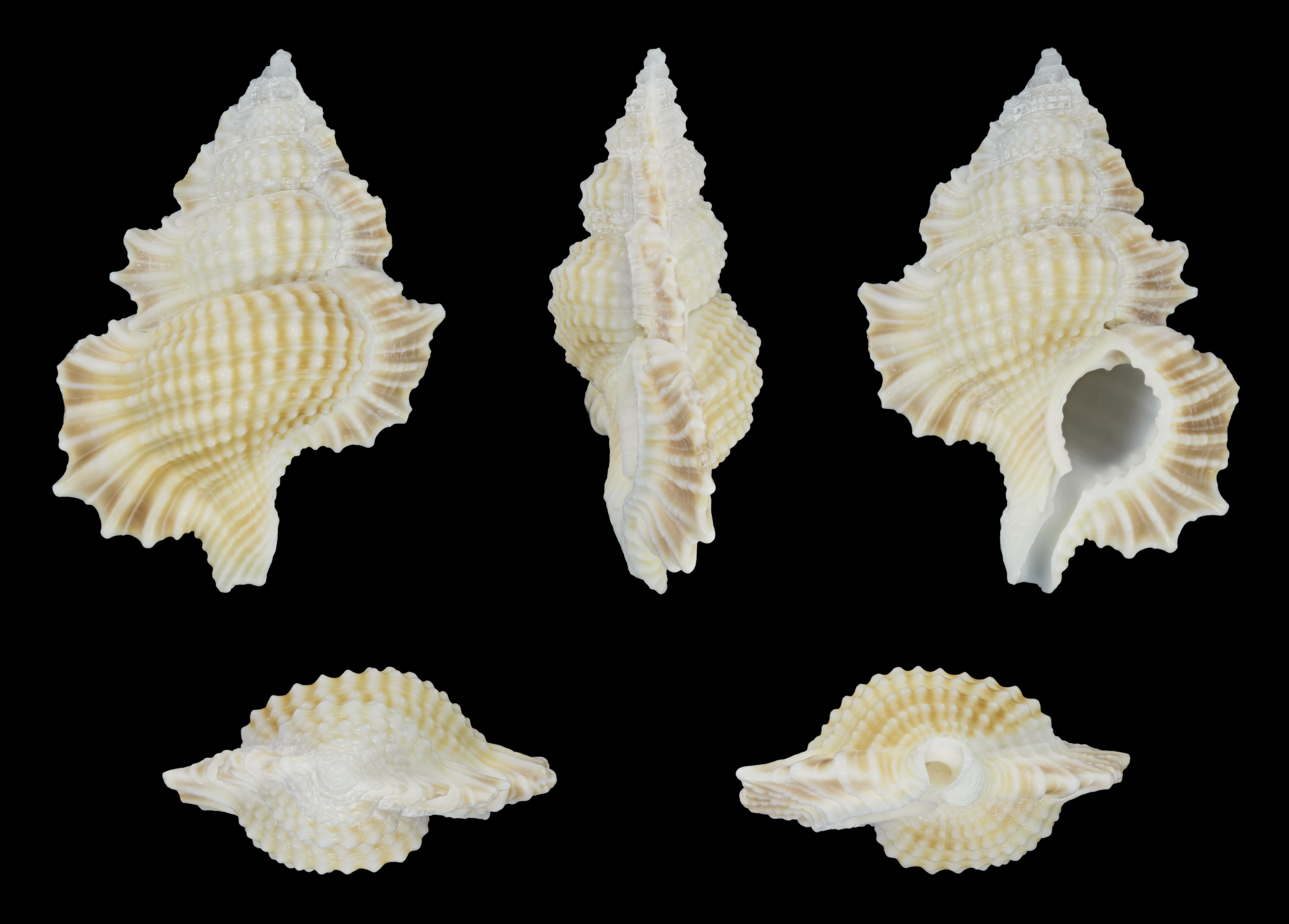
Five views of a shell

The length of the shell attains 51.2 mm.

== Distribution ==
This species occurs in the Indian Ocean off Somalia.
