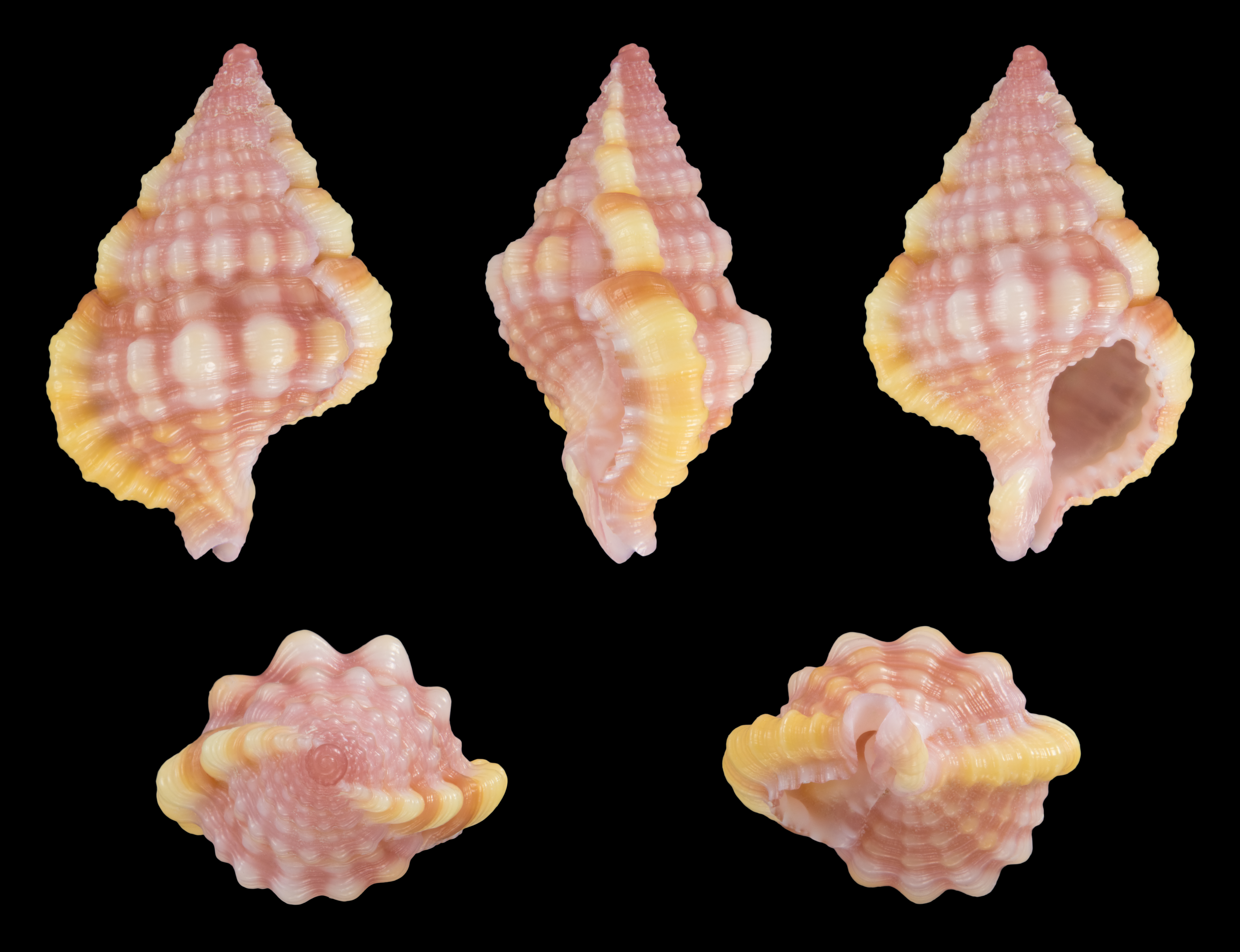

Scientific classification
- Kingdom: Animalia
- Phylum: Mollusca
- Class: Gastropoda
- Subclass: Caenogastropoda
- Order: Littorinimorpha
- Family: Cymatiidae
- Genus: Gyrineum
- Species: G. roseum

Binomial name
- Gyrineum roseum (Reeve, 1844)

Synonyms
- Ranella roseum Reeve, 1844

= Gyrineum roseum =

Species of gastropod

Gyrineum roseum is a species of predatory sea snail, a marine gastropod mollusc in the family Cymatiidae.

== Taxonomy ==
This species possibly intergrades clinally with G. pusillum; DNA analysis would help.

== Distribution ==
This marine species occurs off Tahiti and in the Coral Sea.

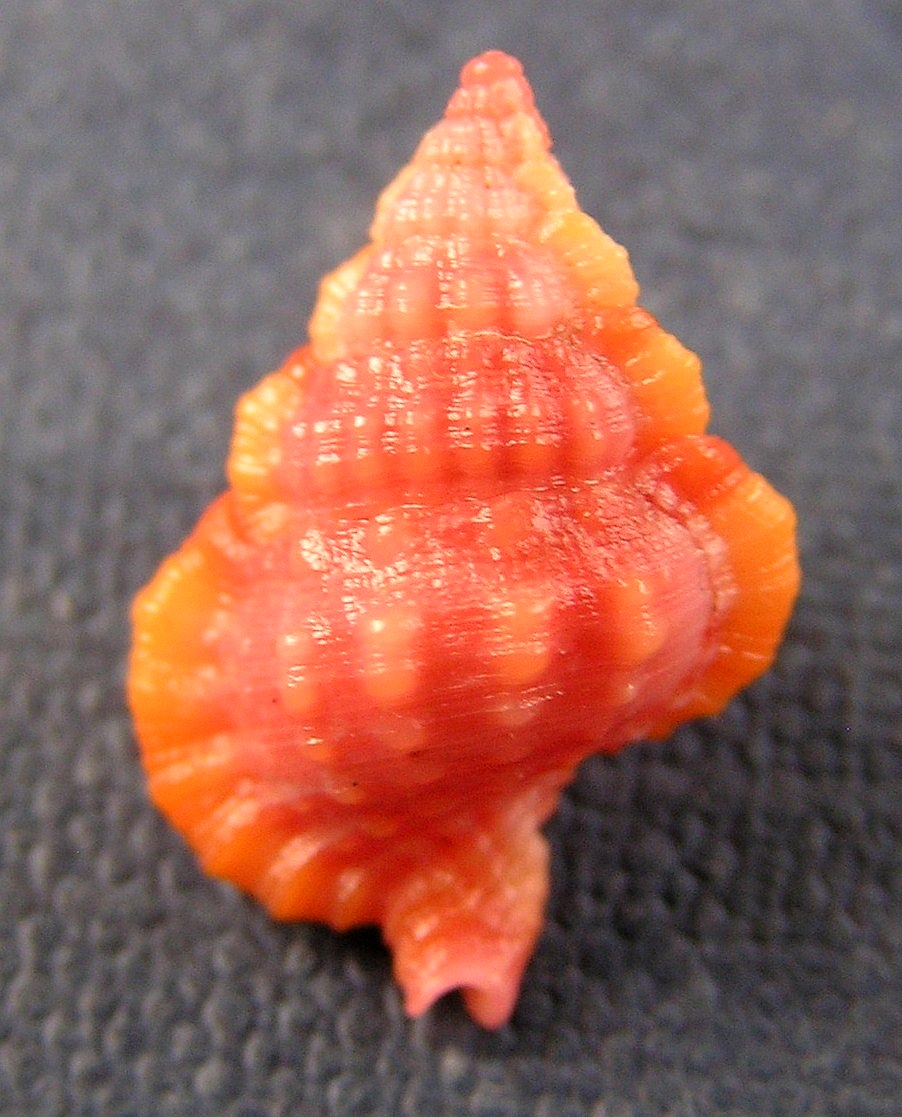
Gyrineum roseum, abapertural view
