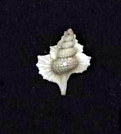
- Shell of Gyrineum pulchellum (museum specimen at Naturalis Biodiversity Center)

Scientific classification
- Kingdom: Animalia
- Phylum: Mollusca
- Class: Gastropoda
- Subclass: Caenogastropoda
- Order: Littorinimorpha
- Family: Cymatiidae
- Genus: Gyrineum
- Species: G. pulchellum

Binomial name
- Gyrineum pulchellum (G.B. Sowerby I, 1825)

Synonyms
- Biplex pulchella (G.B. Sowerby I, 1825); Gyrineum jucundum Adams, A., 1853; Ranella jucunda A. Adams, 1854; Ranella pulchella Forbes, 1852; Ranella pulchella G.B. Sowerby I, 1825 (original combination)

= Gyrineum pulchellum =

Species of gastropod

Gyrineum pulchellum, the tiny winged frog shell, is a species of predatory sea snail, a marine gastropod mollusk in the family Cymatiidae.

== Description ==
The size of the shell varies between 13 mm and 35 mm.

== Distribution ==
This marine species occurs from Indonesia to Northeast Australia.
