= Halgyrineum louisae =

Scientific classification
- Kingdom: Animalia
- Phylum: Mollusca
- Class: Gastropoda
- Subclass: Caenogastropoda
- Order: Littorinimorpha
- Family: Cymatiidae
- Genus: Halgyrineum
- Species: H. louisae

Binomial name
- Halgyrineum louisae (Lewis, 1974)

Synonyms
- Gyrineum atlanticum Fechter, 1975; Gyrineum louisae Lewis, 1974

Species of gastropod

Halgyrineum louisae is a species of predatory sea snail, a marine gastropod mollusk in the family Cymatiidae.

== Description ==
The shell is up to 28 mm high, with a rather high spire, characteristically flattened along an axis perpendicular to the aperture. Protoconch is with 3 whorls, the protoconch I is less than one whorl with a frosted surface, the protoconch II with a conspicuous sculpture of axial ribs and spiral cords, both narrower than the interspaces and forming a regular lattice. Teleoconch is with 5-6 rounded whorls. Sculpture of low, subequal spiral cords, as broad as the interspaces, with low and narrow axial ribs forming small knobs at their intersection with the cords. Varixes are situated along the broadest section of the shell, moderately thick, repeated after a little more than half a whorl so that they are slightly and regularly offset along the spire, overrun by the spirals. The aperture is oval; outer lip faintly fluted inside; parietal and columellar edge forming a continuous callus, the parietal edge with a small but well-marked denticle, the columella is faintly tuberculate. Siphonal canal is open, moderate in length. Shell colour is from very light tan to whitish.

== Distribution ==
The type locality is Oahu, Hawaii, 180 fathoms (330 m).

Distribution of Halgyrineum louisae include:

- scattered localities in the Indo-Pacific: Hawaii, French Polynesia, the Norfolk Ridge, New Caledonia, and Réunion, with a depth range 80–460 m.
- the Atlantic: Great Mteor, Hyères and Irving seamounts, rare in 310–460 m.

== Life cycle ==
Type of larval development: long planktotrophic (teleplanic), inferred from multispiral protoconch with well-developed protoconch II.
